= Glass house =

Glass house or glass houses may refer to:

== Architecture ==
- Greenhouse, a building where plants are cultivated
- Glass works or glasshouse, a manufactory building used for glassblowing
- Glasshouse (British Army), a term for a military prison in the United Kingdom

=== Buildings ===
==== North America ====
- Glass House (New Canaan, Connecticut), a Connecticut building by the American architect Philip Johnson
- Urban Glass House, a New York City building also designed by Johnson
- Glass House (British Columbia), a residence constructed of glass bottles near Boswell, British Columbia, Canada
- Henry Ford II World Center in Dearborn, Michigan, US, known informally as the "Glass House"
- Parker Center, the former headquarters of the Los Angeles Police Department, US, often referred to as the "Glass House"
- Glass House Restaurant in Oklahoma, the original name of the Will Rogers Archway across Interstate 44 near Vinita

==== South America ====
- Casa de Vidro (pt), São Paulo, designed by Lina Bo Bardi

==== Europe ====
- Glass House (Budapest) (Hungarian: üvegház), a former glassworks used as a refuge for Jews during the Holocaust
- The Glasshouse Hotel, a five-star hotel in Edinburgh, Scotland
- The Glass House, Fulham, an early 20th century studio for stained glass artists in London, England
- Aldershot Glasshouse, the Aldershot military prison, England
- Maison de Verre, home and ground floor medical office in Paris, France
- The Glasshouse International Centre for Music, Gateshead, UK

==== Australia ====
- The Glass House, Castlecrag, a heritage-listed house in the Sydney suburb of Castlecrag
- Stockland Glasshouse, an office building and shopping centre in Sydney
- Melbourne Sports and Entertainment Centre, known unofficially as the "Glass House"

== Film and television ==
- Glass Houses (1922 film), an American silent comedy film
- Glass Houses (1972 film), film by Alexander Singer
- The Glass House (1972 film), directed by Tom Gries
- The Glasshouse, a 1994 Channel 4 documentary about Aldershot Glasshouse
- The Glass House (2001 film), starring Leelee Sobieski and Diane Lane
- The Glass House (2009 film), Iranian documentary film by Hamid Rahmanian
- The Glass House (2001 TV series), Australia
- The Glass House (2012 TV series), United States
- Glasshouse (2021 film), South Africa
- Glass House: The Good Mother (2006 film), United States
- Glass Houses (2020 film), nominated for the Canadian Screen Award for Best TV Movie
- "Glass House" (The Copenhagen Test), a 2025 television episode

== Literature ==
- The Glass House: Politics and Morality in the Nation's Capital, a 1984 non-fiction book by U.S. Senator Paul Simon
- The Glasshouse, a 1969 novel by British author Allan Campbell McLean
- The Glass House (novel), 1990 novel by Australian author Sonya Hartnett
- Glasshouse (novel), 2006 novel by Charles Stross
- Glass Houses (novel), 2006 novel by Rachel Caine
- The Glass House, a 2014 novel in The Junction Chronicles by Canadian author David Rotenberg
- Glass Houses, a 2017 novel by Canadian author Louise Penny

== Music ==
- The Glass House (group), American R&B group
- Glass Houses (album), 1980 album by Billy Joel
- Glasshouse (album), 2017 album by Jessie Ware
- "Glasshouse" (song), a 1975 single by The Temptations
- "Glass House", a 2019 song by Machine Gun Kelly from the album Hotel Diablo
- "Glass House" a 2020 song by Gabbie Hanna from the extended play Bad Karma.

== Places ==
- Glasshouse, Gloucestershire, a location in England
- Glasshouses, North Yorkshire, a village in England
- Electoral district of Glass House, Queensland, Australia
- Glass House Mountains, a mountain range in South East Queensland, Australia

== See also ==
- In a Glass House, a 1973 album by Gentle Giant
- The Glass Castle, a 2005 memoir by Jeannette Walls
- House of Glass (disambiguation)
- Bottle wall
