= House of Glass =

House of Glass may refer to:

- House of Glass (radio program), an American radio drama from 1935 - 1954
- Maison de Verre, a building by French architect Pierre Chareau
- House of Glass (Toer novel), a novel in the Buru Quartet tetralogy by Pramoedya Ananta Toer
- A 2014 novel by Sophie Littlefield
- A 2018 novel by Susan Fletcher
- A 2020 family history by Hadley Freeman
- The house music duo Bini & Martini
- A song from the album Hairless Toys by Róisín Murphy
- The House of Glass (film), a 1918 American film directed by Emile Chautard

== See also ==
- Glass house (disambiguation)
