= Neve Tzedek (disambiguation) =

Neve Tzedek (Hebrew: נְוֵה צֶדֶק, נווה צדק, lit. Abode of Justice) is a Jewish neighborhood in southwestern Tel Aviv, Israel.

Neve Tzedek may also refer to:

- Neve Tzedek Prison, Israeli military prison
- Neve Tzedek Tower, skyscraper in Tel Aviv, Israel
- Neve Tzedek, a 1840 book by rabbi Saadia "Mercado" Halevi
