= Miramar, San Diego =

- Community of San Diego
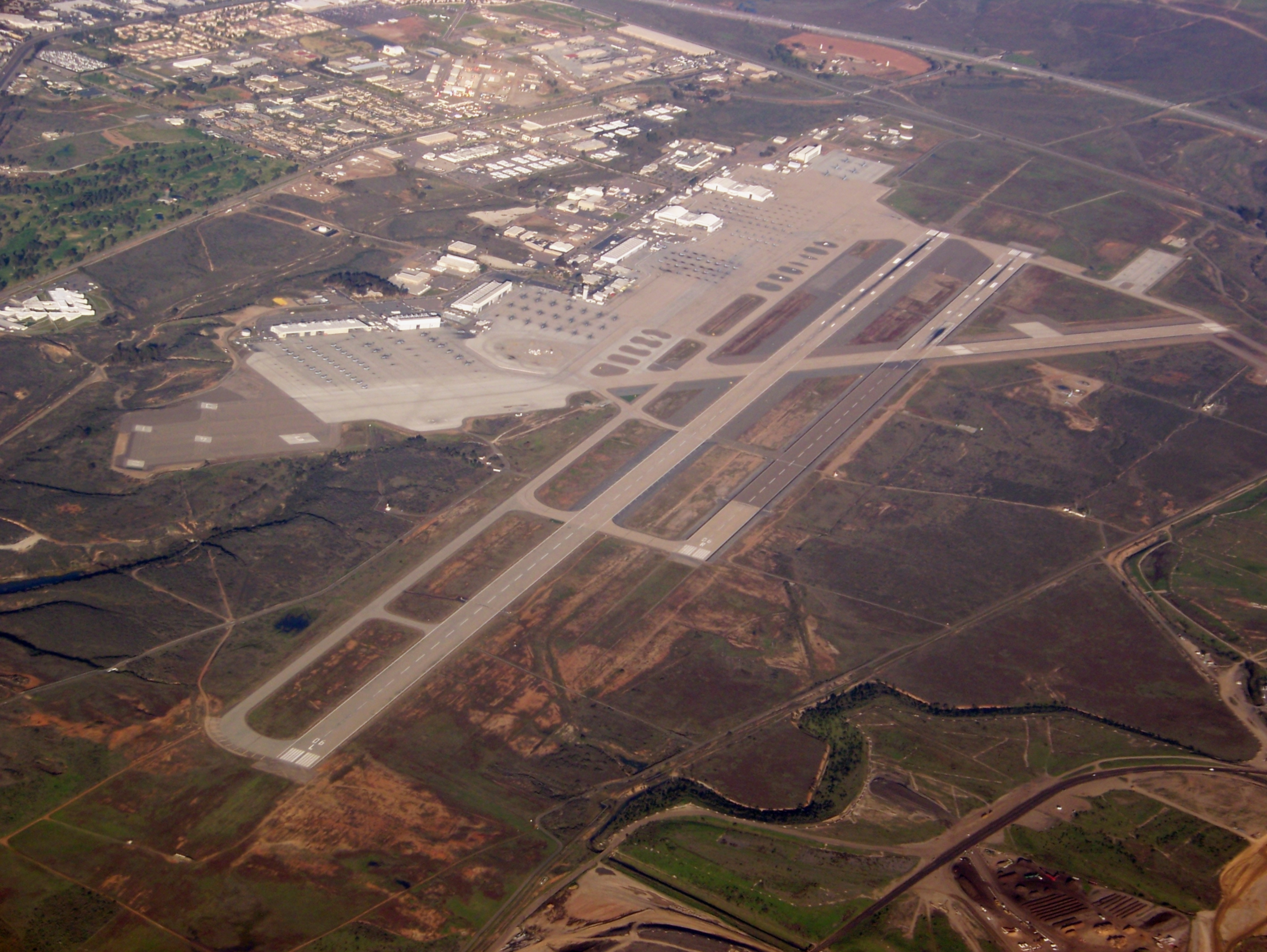
- Marine Corps Air Station Miramar

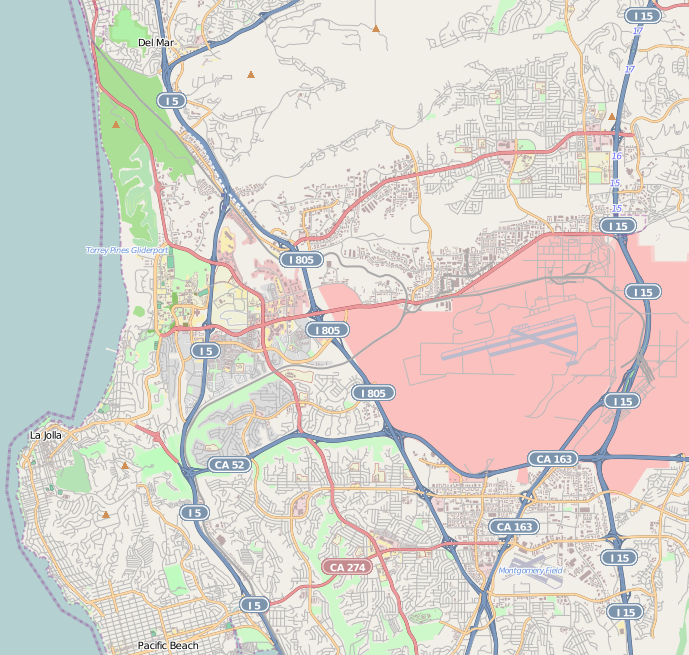
- Location within Northwestern San Diego
- Coordinates: 32°53′11″N 117°9′28″W
- Country: United States of America
- State: California
- County: San Diego
- City: San Diego

Miramar (Spanish for "Sea View") is a neighborhood in the northern part of San Diego, California, United States. It includes residential areas and commercial and light industrial districts.

Most residents live on Marine Corps Air Station Miramar (formerly Naval Air Station Miramar). Miramar was the site of the real TOPGUN flight school made famous by the movie Top Gun in 1986. NAS Miramar was realigned by the Base Realignment and Closure (BRAC) program in 1995 and turned over to the Marine Corps as a fixed wing and helicopter base in 1999. To the north of MCAS Miramar is the suburb of Mira Mesa. The neighborhood is located in City Council District 7.

== History ==
Miramar was originally part of Scripps Ranch, founded by Edward W. Scripps. He named the home he built on the ranch Miramar in the 1890s, after Archduke Maximilian's castle Miramare in Trieste, Italy. The name eventually became applied to the surrounding mesa. Loosely translated from Portuguese, Italian or Spanish, it means "a view of the sea".

Before becoming a military base in 1950, Miramar was a small, isolated community centered on a railroad station. No buildings from the original Miramar have survived.

Over time, a Little India commercial community developed on Black Mountain Road.

== Economy ==
The Miramar submarket consists of approximately 14 million square feet of distribution, warehouse, office, and Miramar Road frontage retail related space. Miramar is one of San Diego County's most recognized real estate markets due in part to its central location, size, and traditional industrial characteristics. This market historically maintains one of the highest occupancy rates in the county. Recent occupancy rates were approximately 91%.

In four to six years, the San Diego Miramar Landfill; the place where the City’s trash goes, will be closed due to being at full capacity. And when that happens, private haulers who try to dump trash there will get a tipping fee. City officials are discussing what to do now and in the upcoming years to find another spot for the trash. They previously announced plans to build an organics processing facility for 77$ million; this will allow the Miramar greenery to close, giving them more space for trash, and more time to plan what next to do.

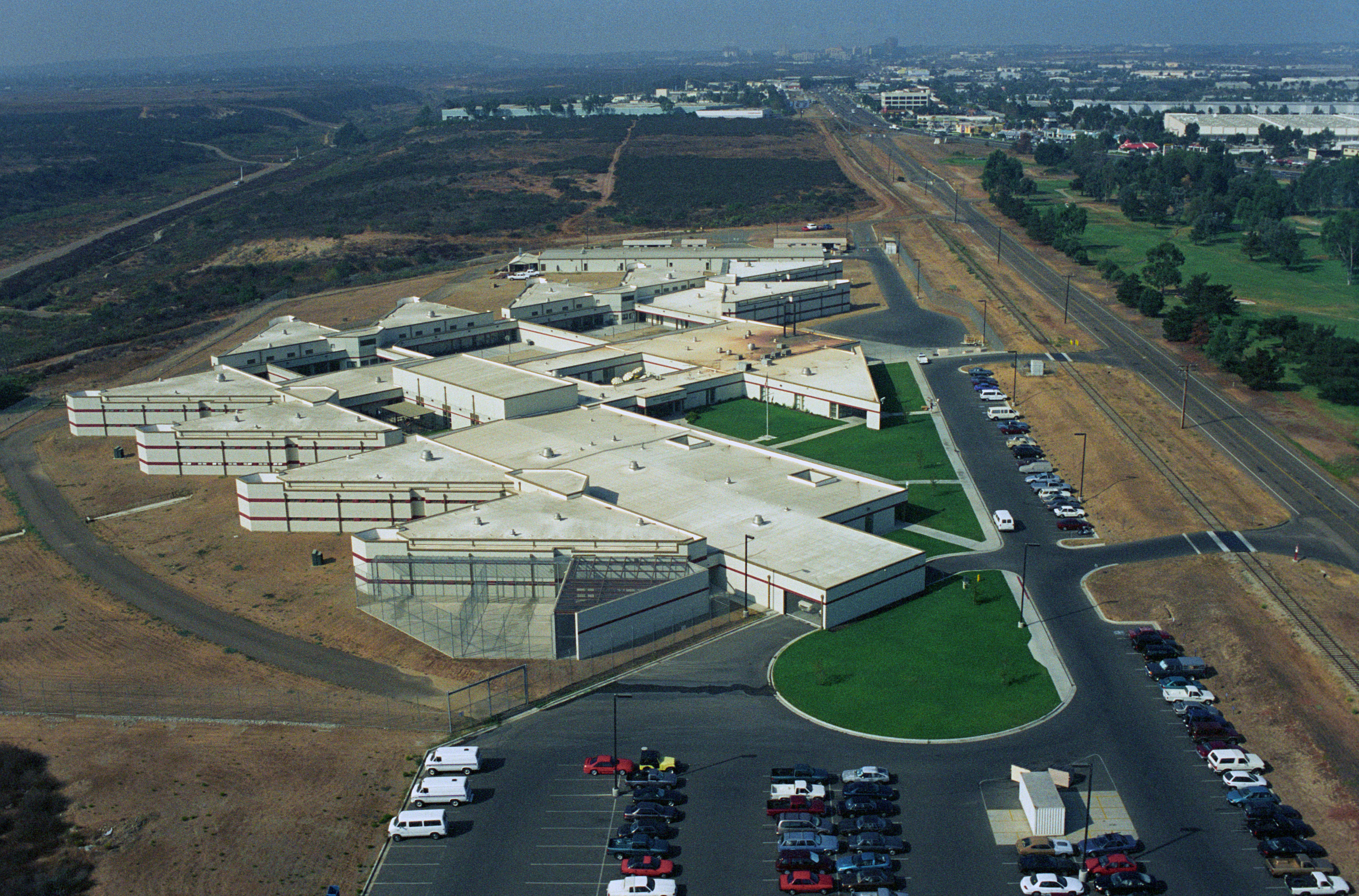
Naval Consolidated Brig, Miramar (1995), a part of the Miramar air station

== See also ==
- Ruby Peters Miramar before the planes: of the U.S. Naval Air Station at San Diego, California; a rural settlement and one room school 1890-1950. (1984)
