= Glass brick =

Semi-transparent ceramic construction material

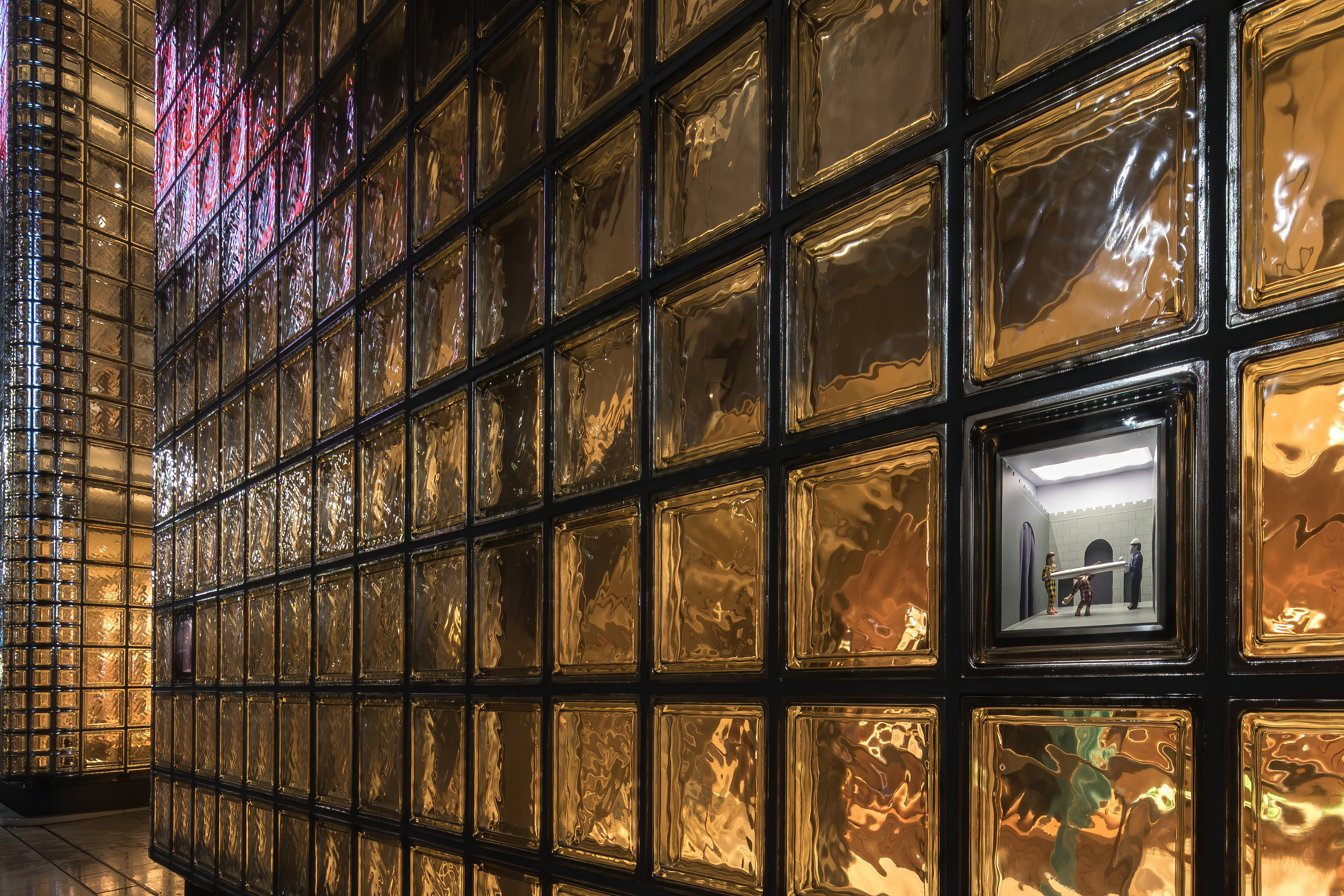
Exterior view of the illuminated facade of Maison Hermès in Tokyo, made of glass bricks.

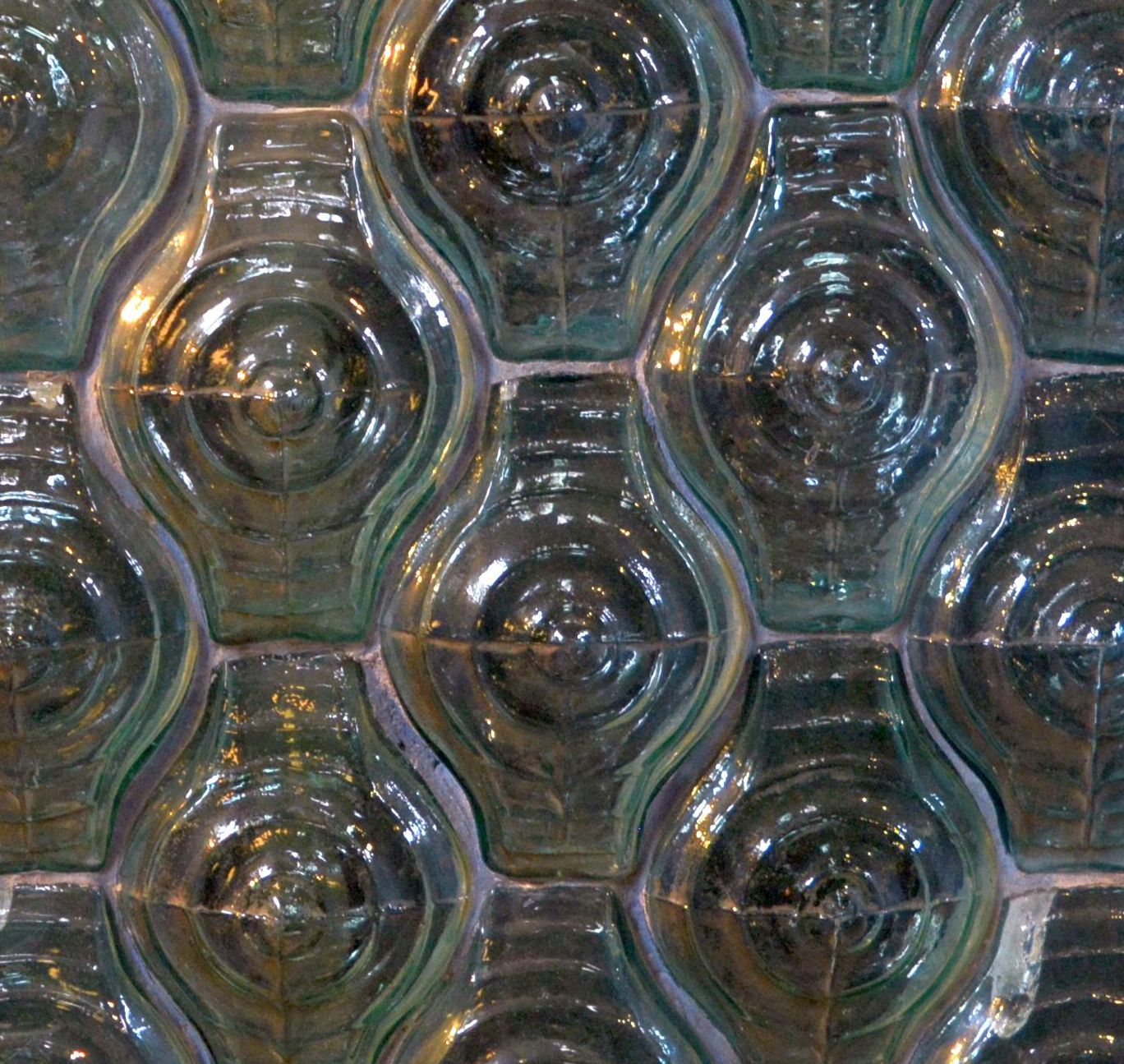
Mouth-blown glass bricks at sewage treatment plant (Mannheim, Germany 1903)

Glass brick, also known as glass block, is an architectural element made from glass. The appearance of glass blocks can vary in color, size, texture and form. Glass bricks provide visual obscuration while admitting light. The modern glass block was developed from pre-existing prism lighting principles in the early 1900s to provide natural light in manufacturing plants. Glass bricks have several attributes that make them useful as a building material, providing insulation and admitting light while still allowing for privacy.

The first hollow glass block was patented in France on November 11, 1886 by Swiss architect Gustave Falconnier. Mass production of glass blocks began in 1932, with the construction of the Owens-Illinois Glass Block building. It has had a varied popularity since, appearing in Streamline Moderne and Brutalist architecture. Today glass blocks are used in walls, skylights, and sidewalk lights.

== History ==
=== 19th century precursors (1850s–1890s) ===
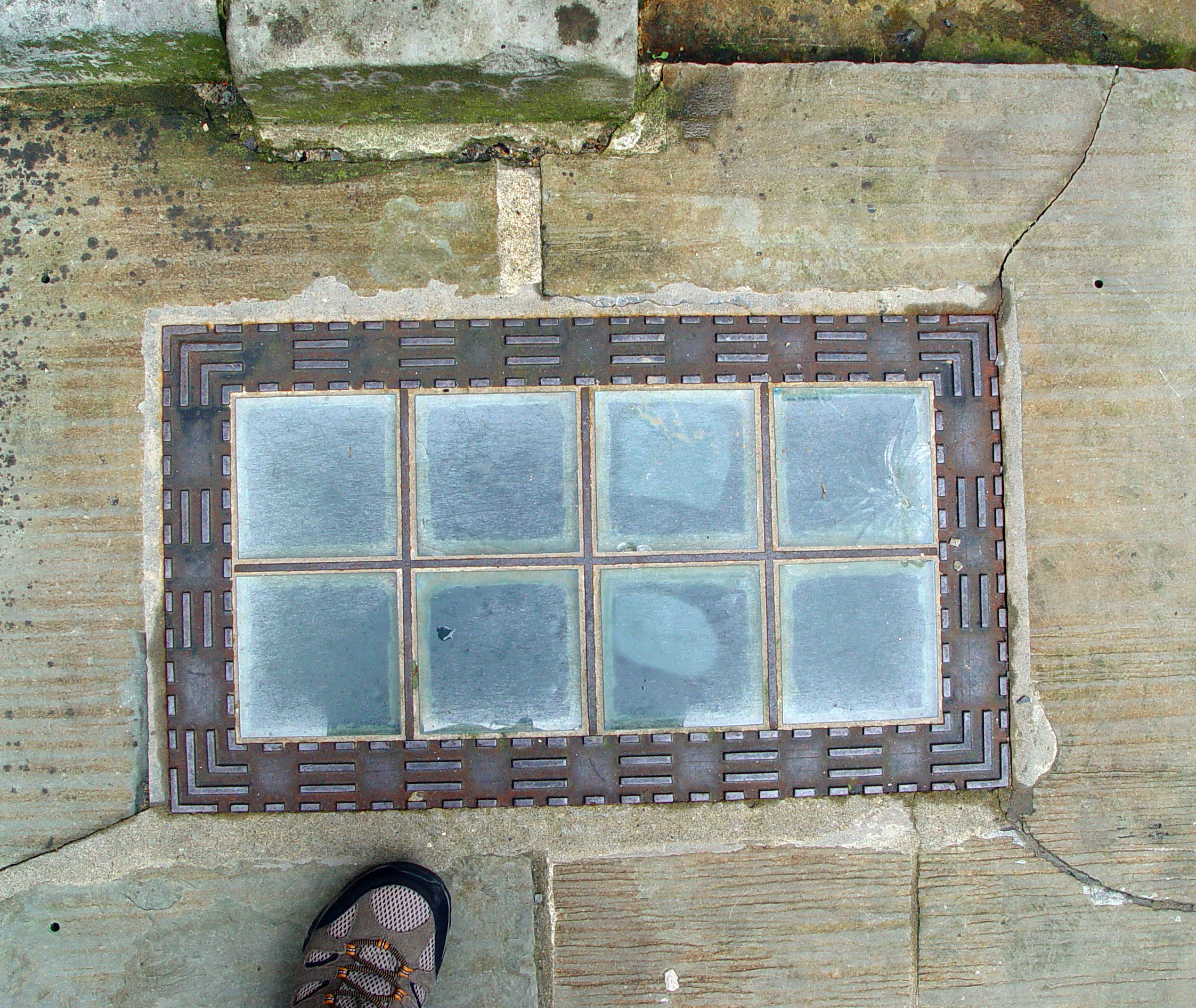
Vault lights made of load-bearing glass bricks and embedded into a pavement in Burlington House, London.

Vault lights in sidewalks, which utilized prism lighting, were one of the first steps towards the modern hollow glass brick. At the end of the nineteenth century glass prisms became a popular way to diffuse light into spaces that would otherwise be difficult or unsafe to light via flame-based oil lamps (e.g. basements underneath sidewalks).

Modern glass bricks were preceded by the hollow glass bricks patented by Gustave Falconnier in the 1880s. Falconnier Bricks were blown glass bricks available in multiple colors and were formed in molds while the glass was molten. They could be used for walls or roofs and were joined with wire and cement. The suggested use for Falconnier glass bricks was in greenhouse construction due to the non-conductivity of the glass for temperature control and lack of porosity of glass for moisture control. They were touted for not tarnishing, trapping dust, or retaining water.

=== 20th century ===
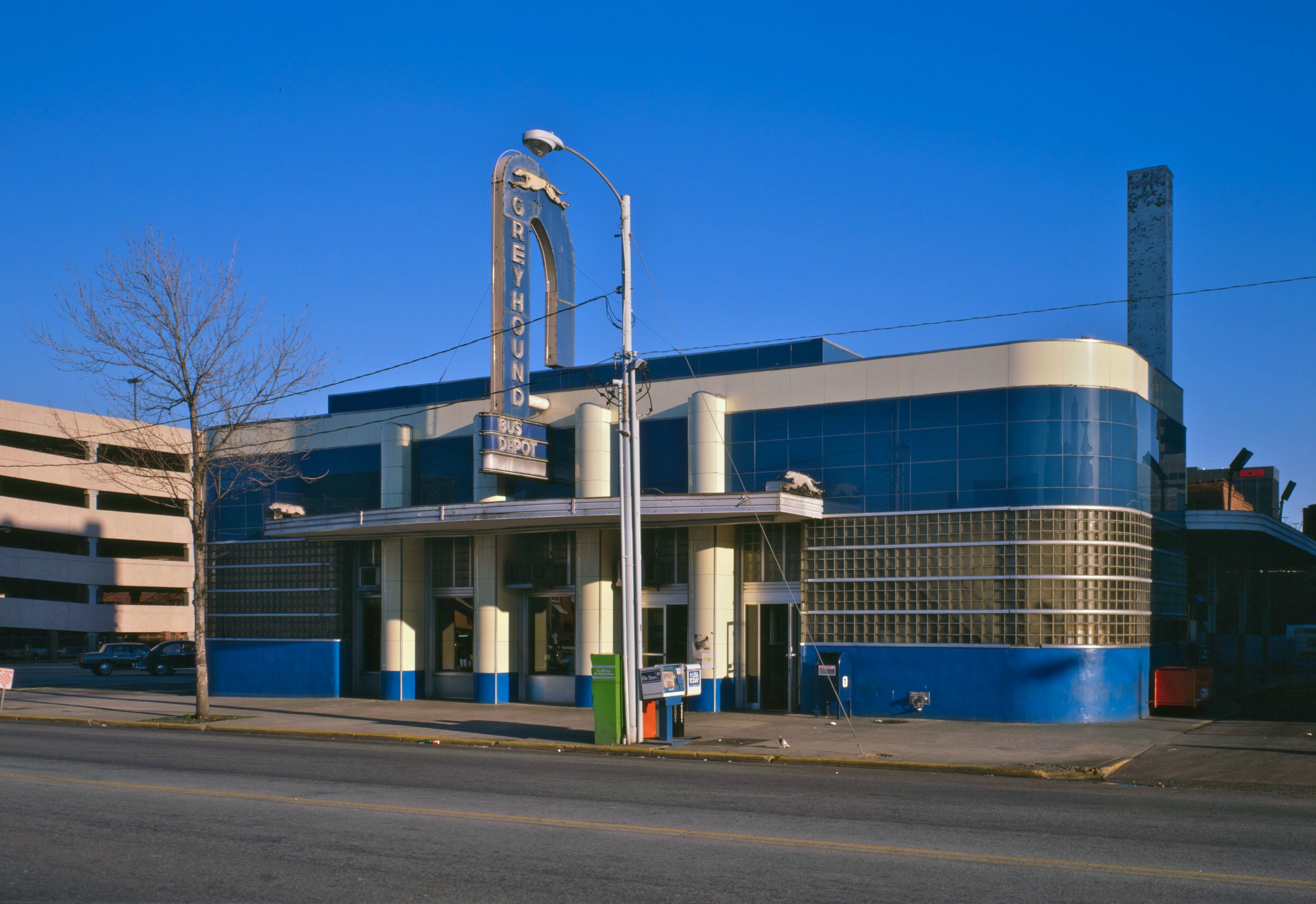
A Greyhound station located in Richmond, Virginia and constructed 1938–1939. Curved glass blocks are prominent along the front exterior of the building, demonstrating the Streamline Moderne architectural style endemic to the period.

In 1914, glass bricks (as well as several other kinds of glass furnishings) were used in Bruno Taut's Glass Pavilion, a significant building exemplary of the greater use of glass during the period.

In the 1930s, glass blocks flourished among buildings built in the Art Deco and Streamline Moderne style. When used in forming a large, diffuse panel of glass, the bricks allowed light to pass into the building in daytime as well as pass out from the building at night, creating a glowing effect.

Glass brick saw use as a building material throughout the rest of the 20th century. In the 1970s, architect Tadao Ando utilized glass block for the construction of the courtyards of several houses in Osaka, Japan.

=== 21st century ===
While glass bricks have a reduced popularity in modern architecture, it remains a common material for use in lavatories due to its ability to spread light while maintaining privacy via diffraction. Glass bricks are also used in art installations, such as the Crown Fountain in Chicago which features twin glass brick towers.

== Attributes ==
=== Appearance ===
The texture and color of glass blocks can vary in order to provide a range of transparency. Patterns can be pressed into either the inner void or the outside surface of the glass when it is cooling in order to provide differing effects. Glazes or inserts may also be added in order to create a desired private or decorative effect.

=== Standards and grading ===
Glass blocks in Europe are manufactured in accordance with the European Standard EN1052-2. The International Standard is ISO TC 160/SG1. The Standards allow for variation in sizes and production irregularity. Blocks fall within three classifications; Class 1, Class 2 and Class 3 with Class 1 being the highest and best rating with a maximum permissible deviation from designed size and rectangularity of 1 mm.

=== Insulation ===
Glass brick has an r value between 1.75 and 1.96, close to that of thermopane windows. There are newer glass blocks injected with argon gas and having a layer of low-emissivity glass between the halves, which increases the insulative (U) value to 1.5 W/m^{2}·K, which is between triple glazed windows (1.8 W/m^{2}·K) and specialty double glazed windows with advanced frame and coatings(1.2 W/m^{2}·K).

== Applications ==
=== Wall blocks ===
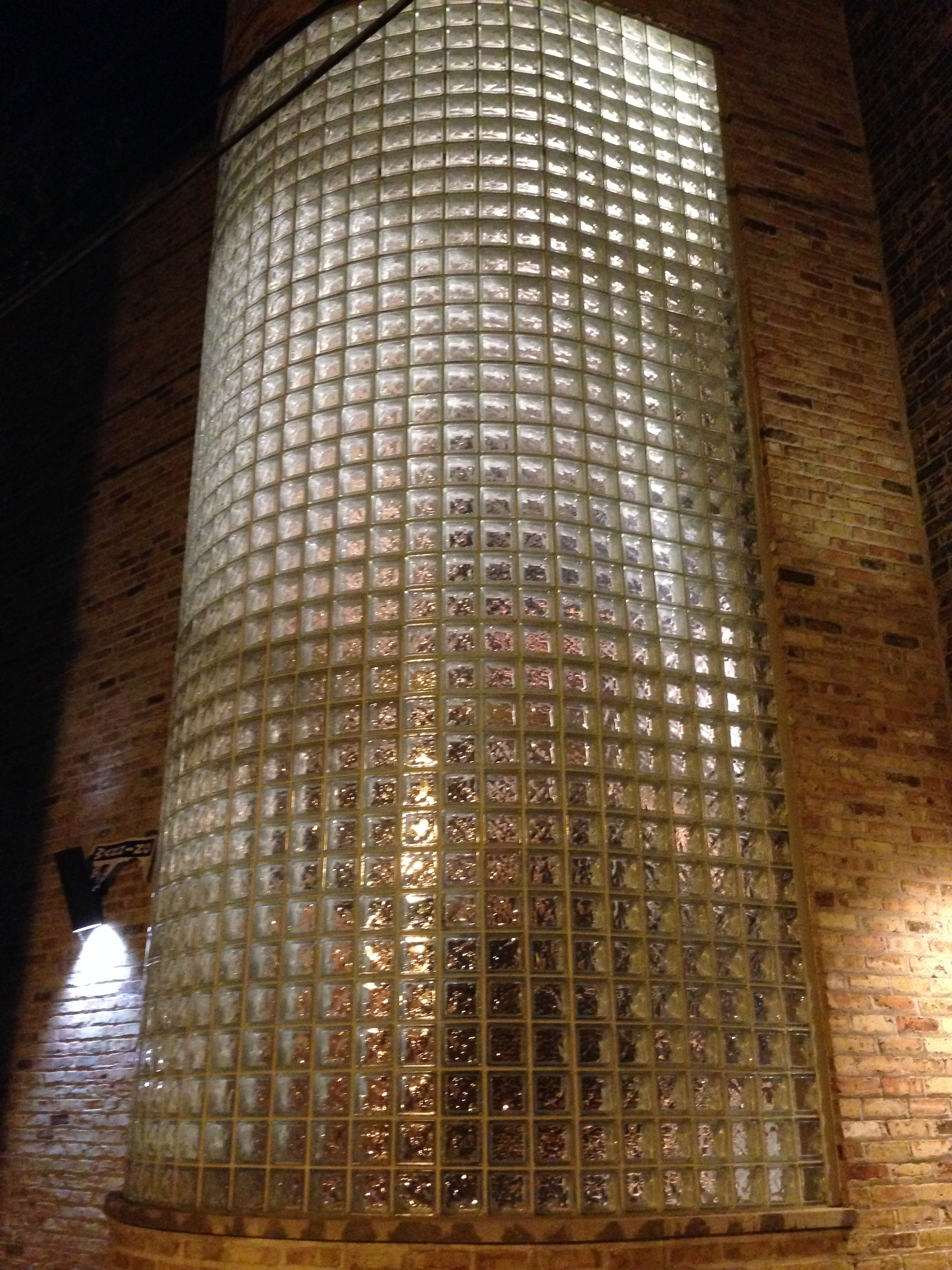
Glass block wall in Chicago.

Glass blocks can provide light and serve as a decorative addition to an architectural structure, but hollow glass blocks are non load-bearing unless stated otherwise. Hollow glass wall blocks are manufactured as two separate halves and, while the glass is still molten, the two pieces are pressed together and annealed. The resulting glass blocks will have a partial vacuum at the hollow center. Due to the hollow center, wall glass blocks do not have the load-bearing capacity of masonry bricks and therefore are utilized in curtain walls. Glass block walls are constrained based on the framing in which they are set. If a masonry or steel frame exists, the maximum area of the wall can be 144 square feet (13.4 m^{2}), whereas the maximum area without a frame is 100 square feet (9.3 m^{2}).

The William Lescaze House and Office at 211 East 48th Street in New York City, built in 1934, was the city's first house to use glass blocks as walls.

=== Skylights and sidewalk lights ===
Glass blocks used in flooring are normally manufactured as a single solid piece, or as a hollow glass block with thicker side walls than the standard wall blocks. These blocks are normally cast into a reinforced concrete gridwork or set into a metal frame, allowing multiple units to be combined to span over openings in basements and roofs to create skylights. Glass wall blocks should not be used in flooring applications because the way in which they are manufactured does not allow them to support a load.

=== Construction methods ===
Glass wall blocks are fixed together to form complete walls by several methods – the most common method of construction is to bed the blocks together in a Portland cement–based mortar with reinforcing rods of steel placed within the mortar as recommended by the project architect or block manufacturer.

Other methods of construction include several proprietary systems whereby the mortar is replaced by timber or PVC extrusions.

== Specialty types ==
Specialist glass blocks are produced for various applications including:

=== Bullet and vandal resistance ===
Bullet and vandal resistant blocks are generally solid glass or have very thick side walls similar to pavement blocks.

=== Fire resistant ===
Fire resistance of varying degrees can be achieved by several methods. Standard production hollow wall block will offer little fire resistance; however, resistance is improved by utilizing specially produced hollow blocks with thicker sidewalls, or the inclusion of a special layer of fire-resisting material between the two halves of the block during manufacture. Some manufacturers of glass blocks have developed a method of bonding two glass blocks together with adhesive, producing blocks of up to 160 mm (6 1/2 in) thick with enhanced fire resistance. It is important that the block manufacturer's recommendations are followed with regards to the installation of fire resisting glass block walls, as without special construction techniques, the wall will not achieve the desired fire resistance.

=== Gas insulated ===
A recent innovation in the manufacture of glass blocks is the inclusion of argon gas within the hollow center of glass wall blocks. This advancement in production technique has resulted in a glass block which is able to offer significantly improved thermal insulation properties.

=== Colored ===
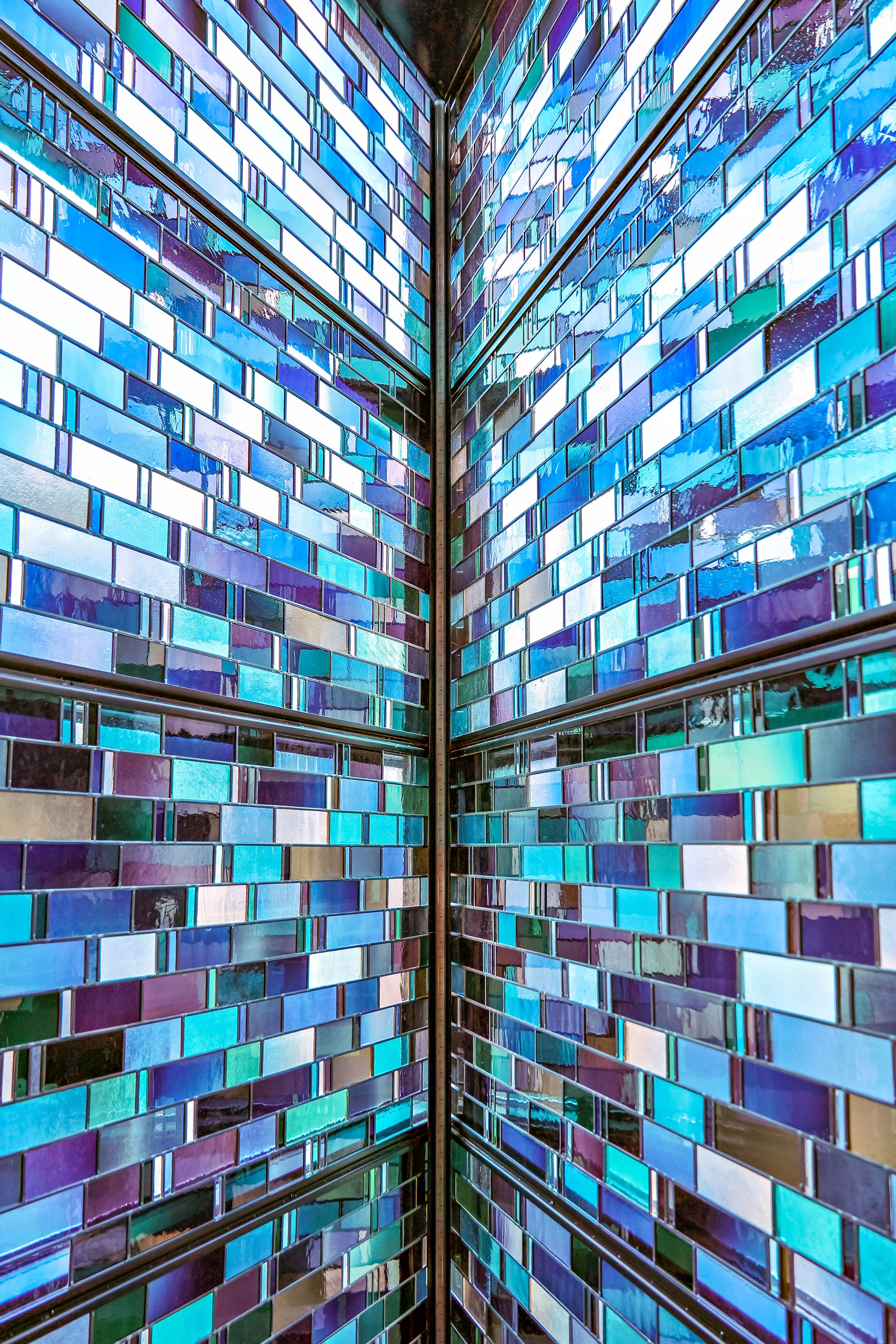
Blue Oriel Window (interior view) in the Museum of German Romanticism

Some hollow glass wall blocks are available in colored variants. These colored variants fall into two categories. The first type is manufactured with UV stable colored glass and can be used in the same locations as standard clear glass blocks. The second type utilizes a colored material (dye or transparent paint) which is injected into the hollow center of the blocks to form a permanent coating, enabling vibrant colors to be achieved which are not possible with colored glass. However, the colored coating may not be UV stable and can fade in bright sunshine over time, and may therefore not be suitable for all locations.

== Examples of architectural use ==
- Real-Time Control Building #3 in Edmonton, Canada.
- Maison de Verre (for House of Glass) in Paris, France
- Michigan State Capitol in Lansing, Michigan
- Hermès luxury retail space in Ginza, Tokyo, Japan by Renzo Piano
- Ibrox Stadium, Glasgow
- Österreichische Postsparkasse in Vienna, Austria by Otto Wagner
- Raphael's Refuge, outside of Flatonia, Texas
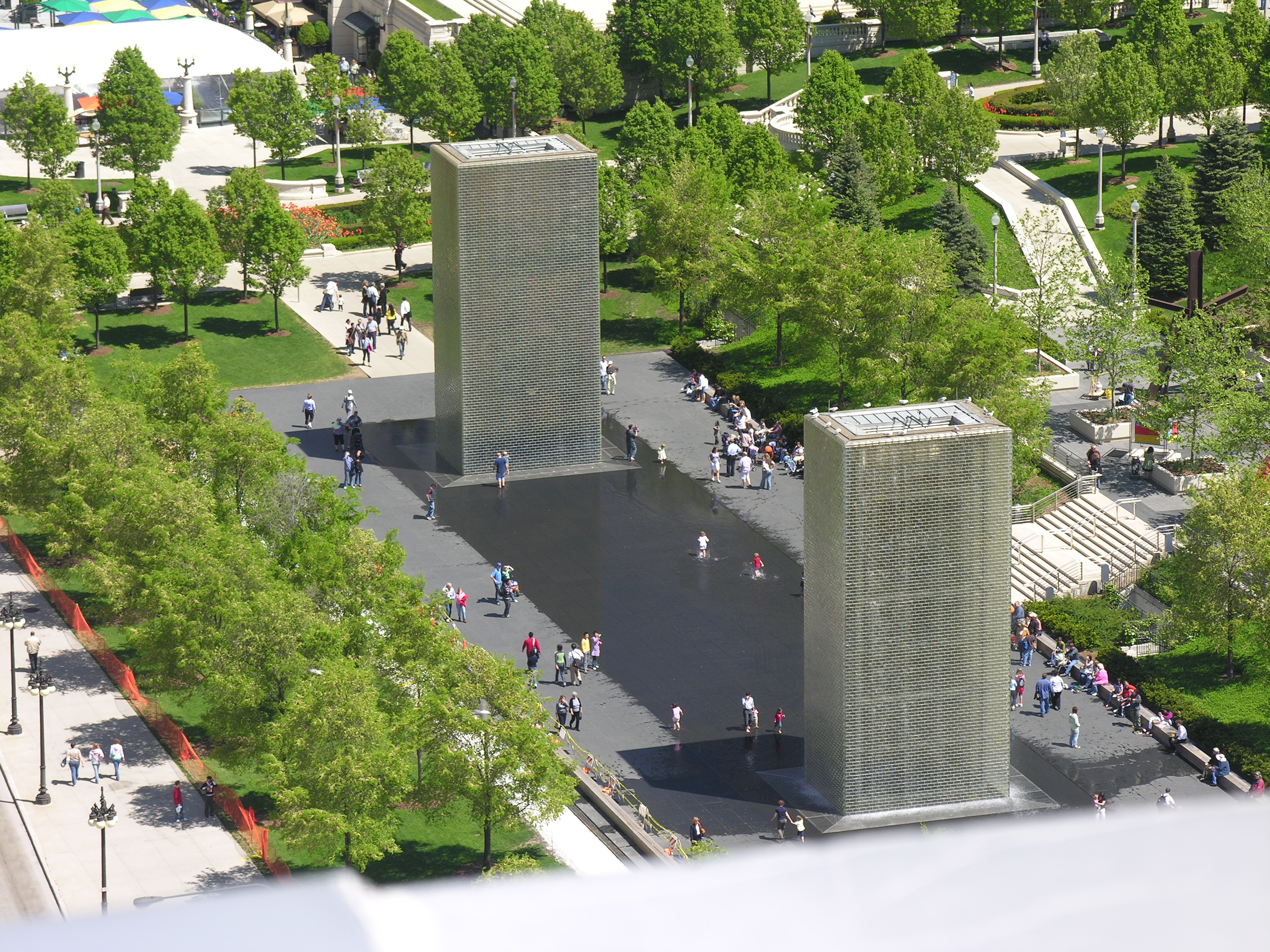
Crown Fountain is composed of glass brick towers.

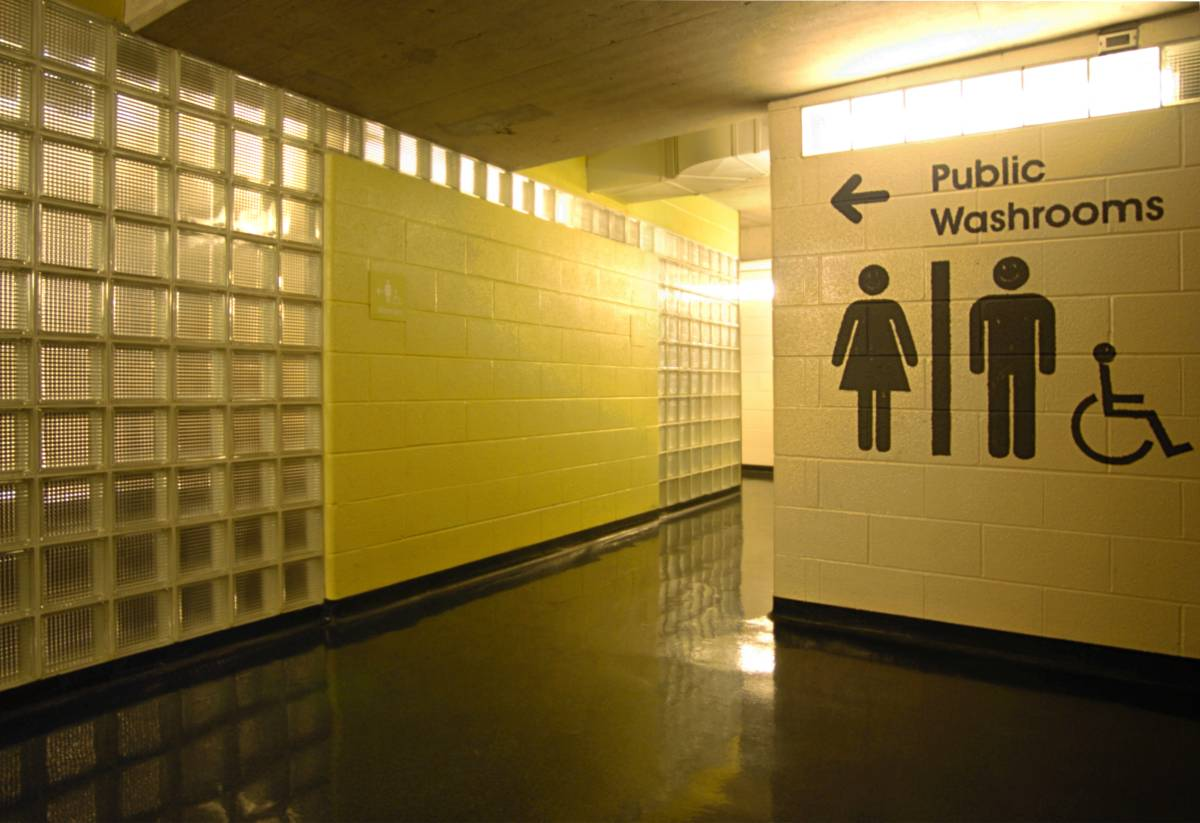
Glass brick labyrinths, used to obscure clear visual line of sight into women's washroom on the left, and men's washroom on the right.

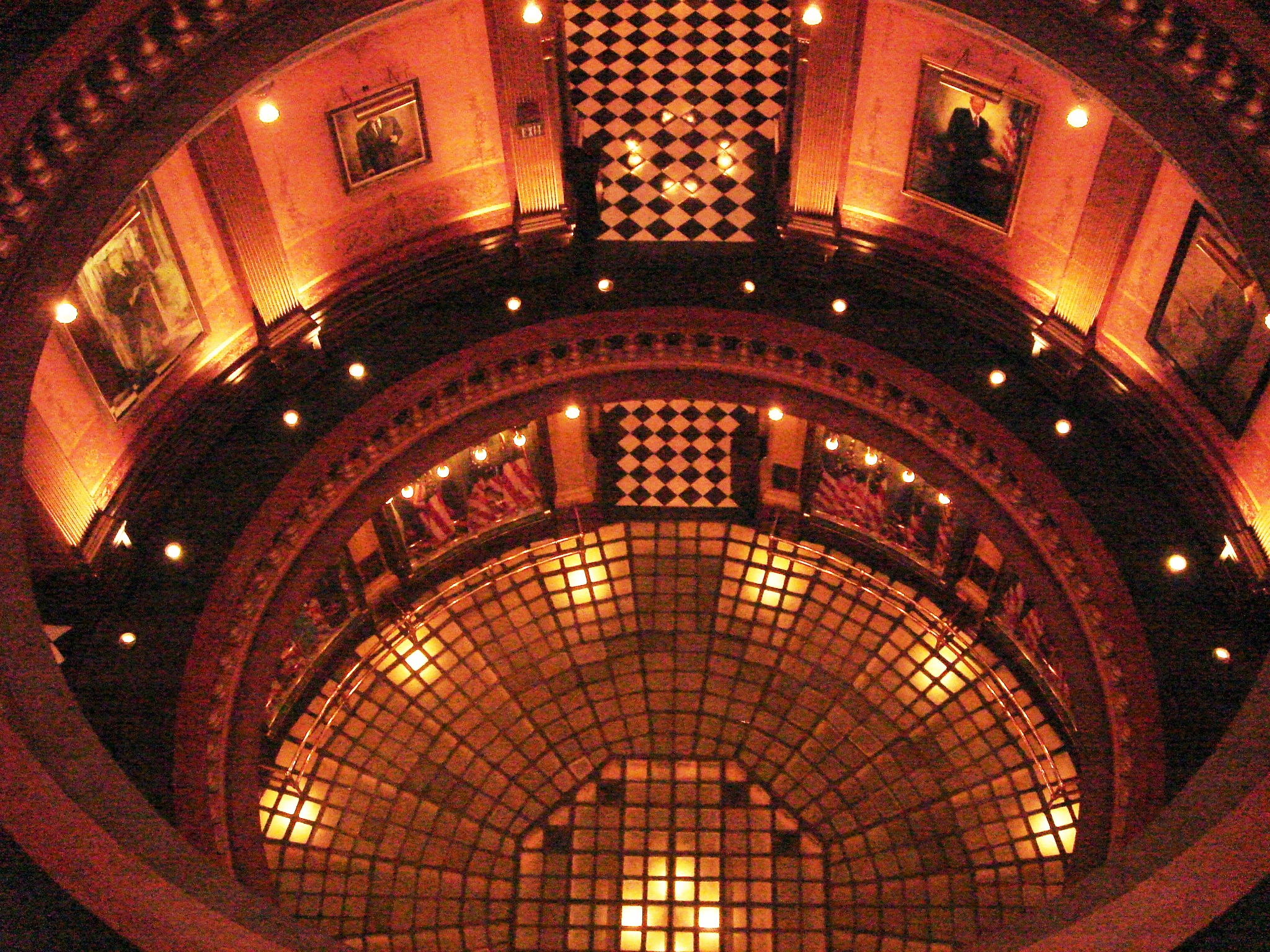
Glass block floor in the Michigan State Capitol

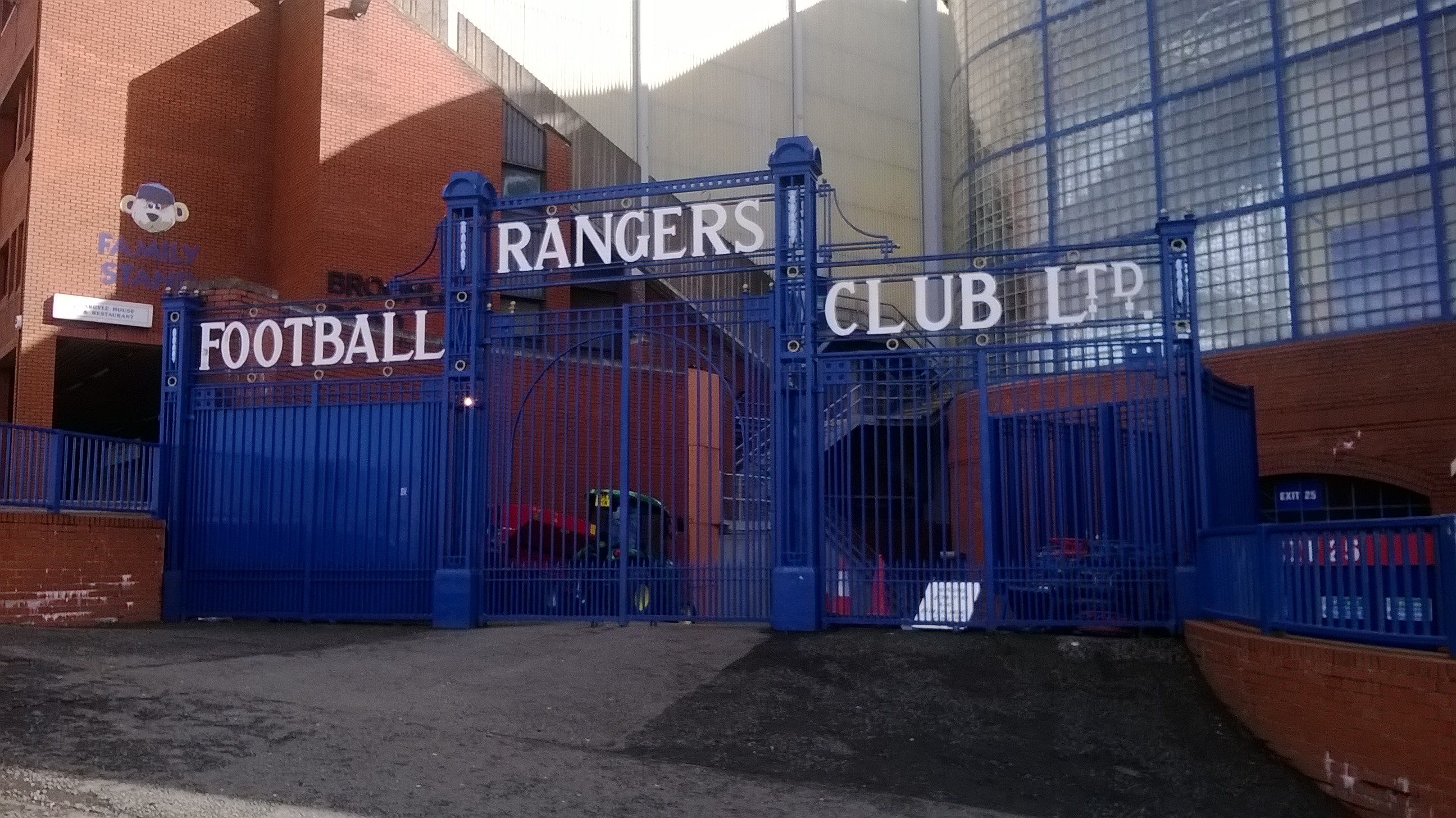
Glass block staircase towers at Ibrox Stadium

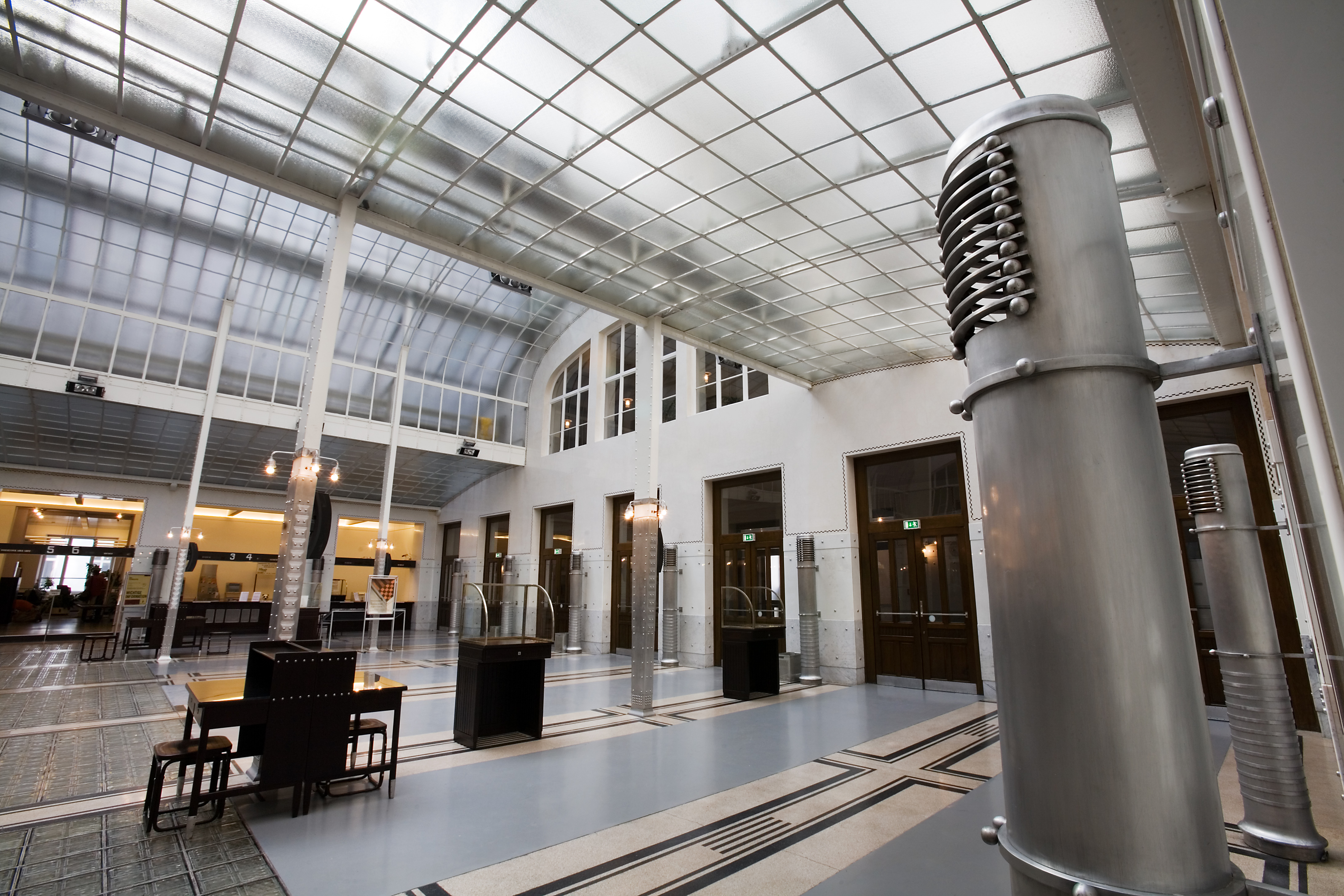
Load-bearing prism lights in the banking hall of the Österreichische Postsparkasse in Vienna.

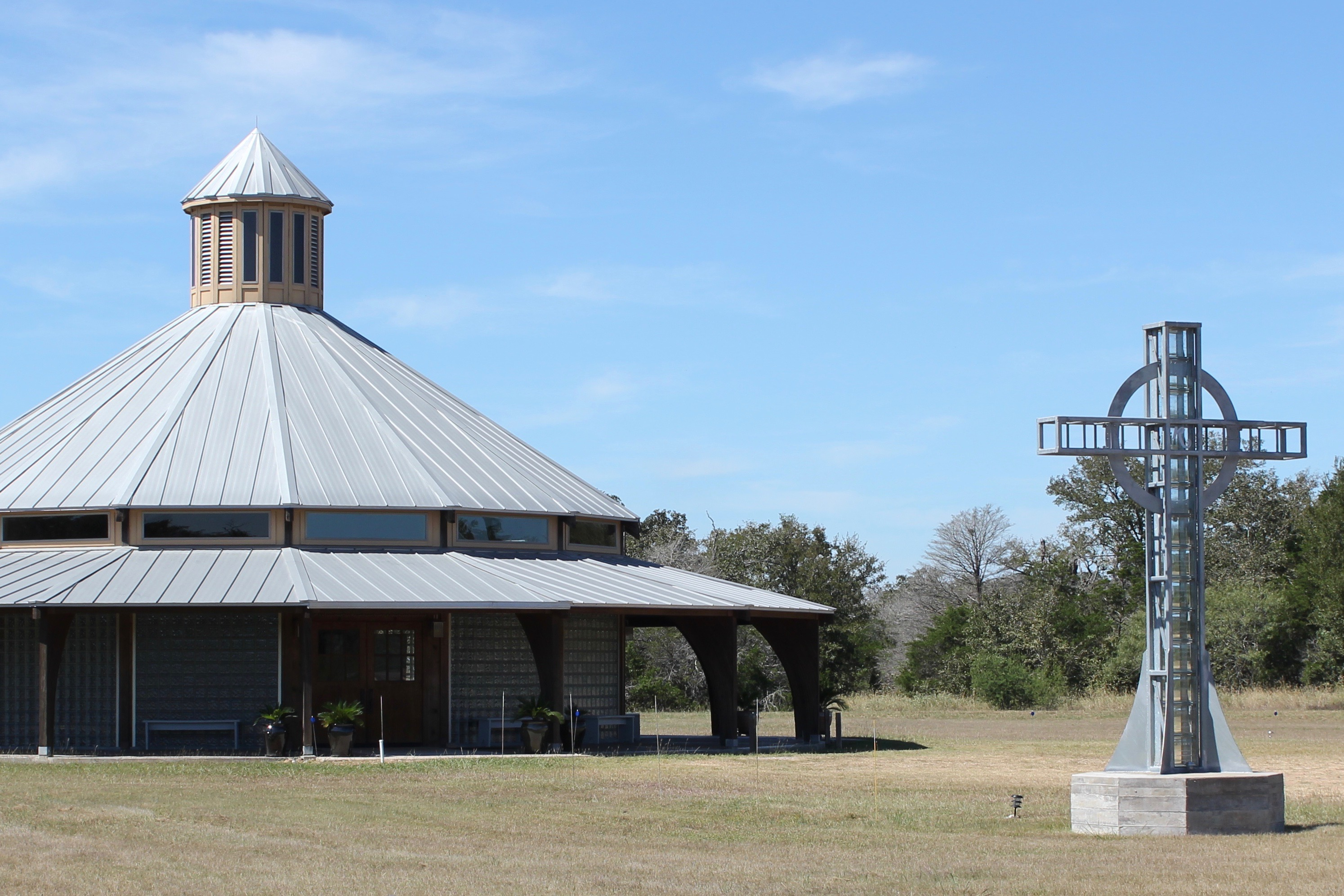
Glass block curtain walls at Raphael's Refuge outside of Flatonia, Texas

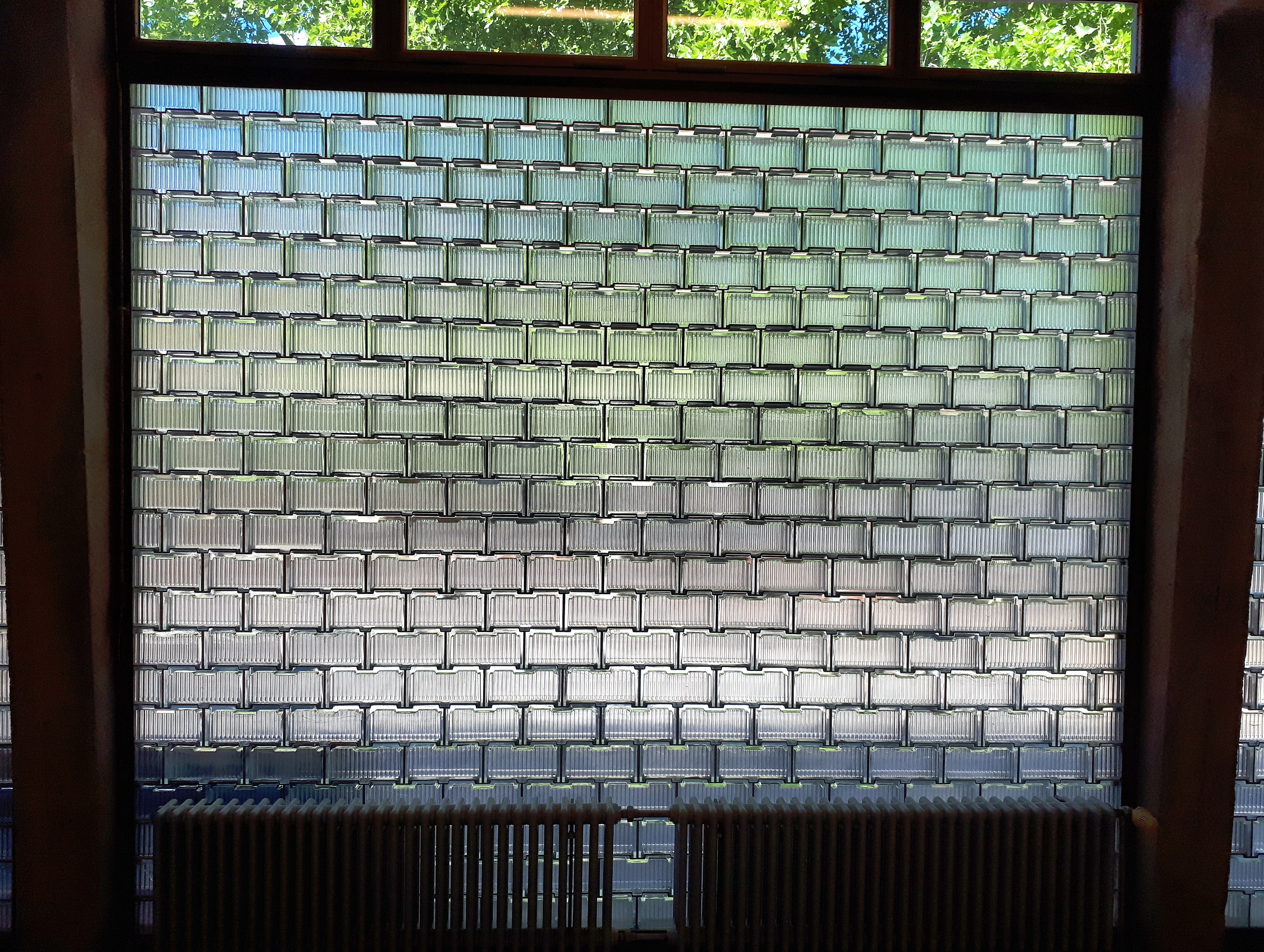
Glass blocks in the form of bricks in the school in Bernau.

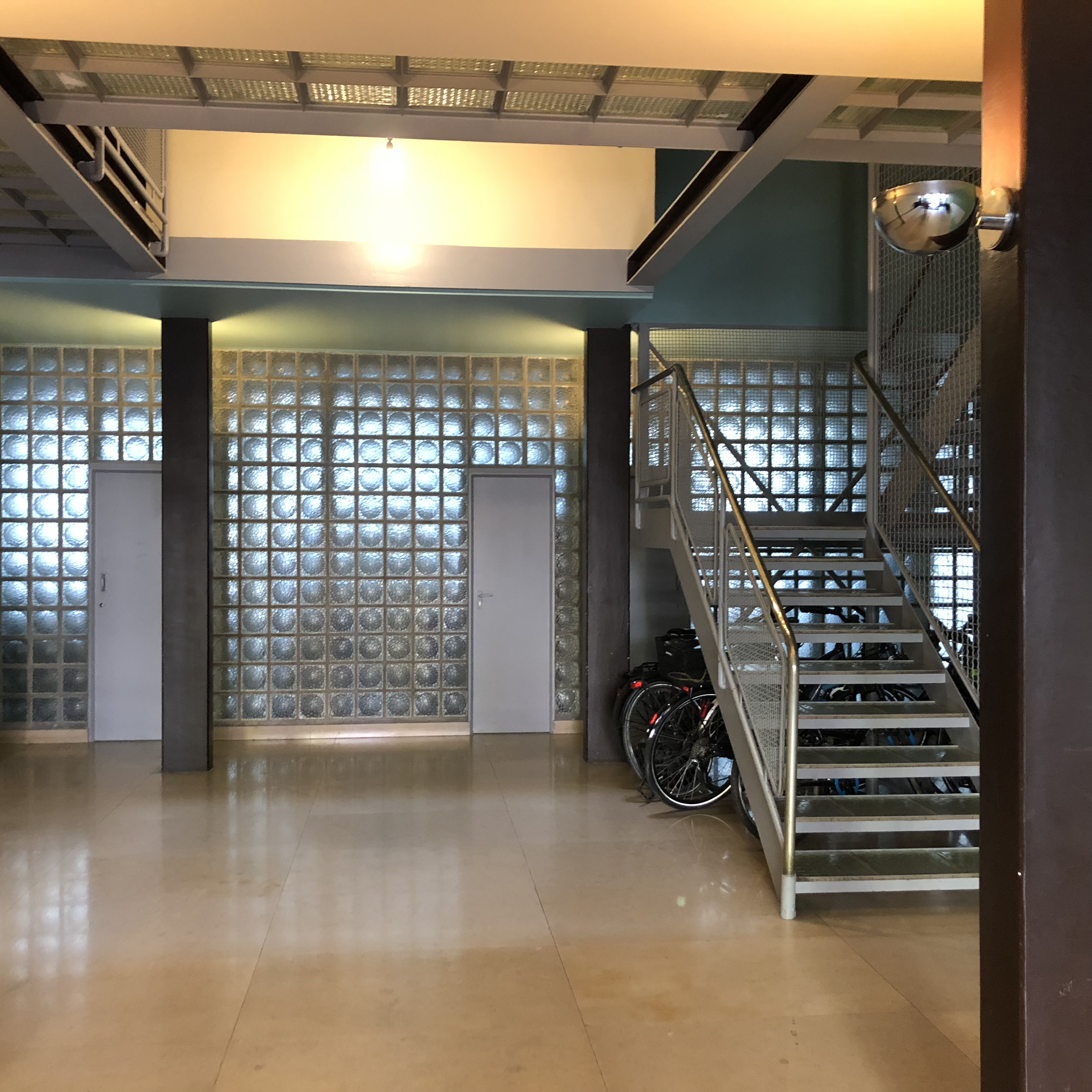
Glass bricks forming ceiling, stairs and wall in an apartment building Immeuble Clarté in Geneva.

== See also ==
- Bottle wall
