= Reclusione Militare =

Italian military jail

Reclusione Militare is a term for time served in a military jail by members of the Italian Armed Forces.

The term of the sentences that may be served by inmates ranges from a minimum of 1 month to a maximum of 30 years. All service members sentenced must do hard labor while incarcerated. Anyone sentenced to more than 5 years is discharged from the armed forces and may not return.

Officers who are sentenced and have not been given a reduction in rank from officer have the right to serve their time in a special section of the military jail.

Article number 26 of the Italian military penal code discusses this penalty.
