= Naval Consolidated Brig, Miramar =

US Navy military prison in San Diego, California

Naval Consolidated Brig Miramar Joint Regional Correctional Facility Southwest
- Part of Marine Corps Air Station Miramar
- San Diego, California in the United States
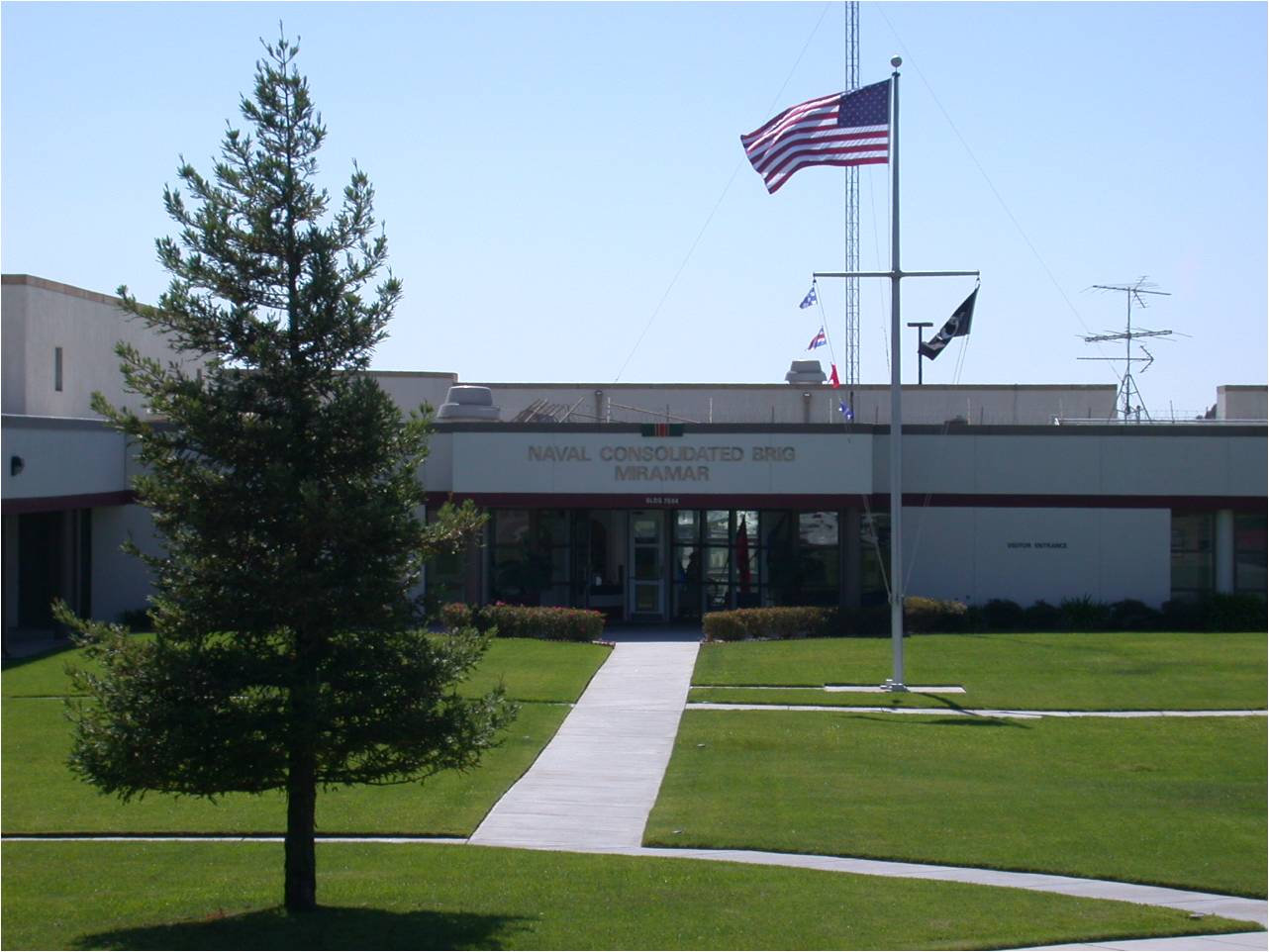
- Entrance to facility in the 2000s

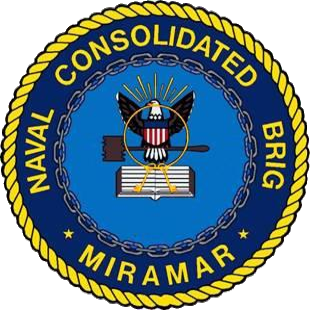

Site information
- Type: Military prison
- Owner: Department of Defense
- Operator: United States Navy
- Controlled by: Navy Personnel Command
- Condition: Operational
- Capacity: 400 inmates
- Website: Official website

Location
- Location in the United States
- Coordinates: 32°52′48″N 117°9′7″W

Site history
- Built: 1989
- In use: 1989–present

Garrison information
- Current commander: Commander Stephanie L. Marcelo

Naval Consolidated Brig, Miramar (NAVCONBRIG) is a military prison operated by the U.S. Navy at Marine Corps Air Station Miramar in Miramar in San Diego, California, just under 10 miles (16 km) north of downtown San Diego. It is one of three Navy consolidated brigs and is the Pacific area regional confinement facility for the United States Department of Defense. It is also known as the Joint Regional Correctional Facility Southwest. The 208,000-square-foot (19,300 m^{2}) facility has a capacity of up to 400 male and/or female prisoners and is staffed with 31 civilian and 173 military personnel. It is about 1.5 miles (2.4 km) from the MCAS Miramar East Gate Entrance.

Naval Consolidated Brig, Miramar, houses some Tier II male prisoners of the United States Navy (who serve sentences of up to 10 years) and female prisoners from all areas of the United States Department of Defense. NAVCONBRIG Miramar executive officer, Commander Kris Winter, said that before NAVCONBRIG Miramar was designed as the place for all female prisoners, it was difficult for the U.S. military to have "successful female-specific rehabilitation programs" since there were not enough women in any one location. The consolidation of all women in Miramar was intended to provide a female-oriented corrections program.

== History ==
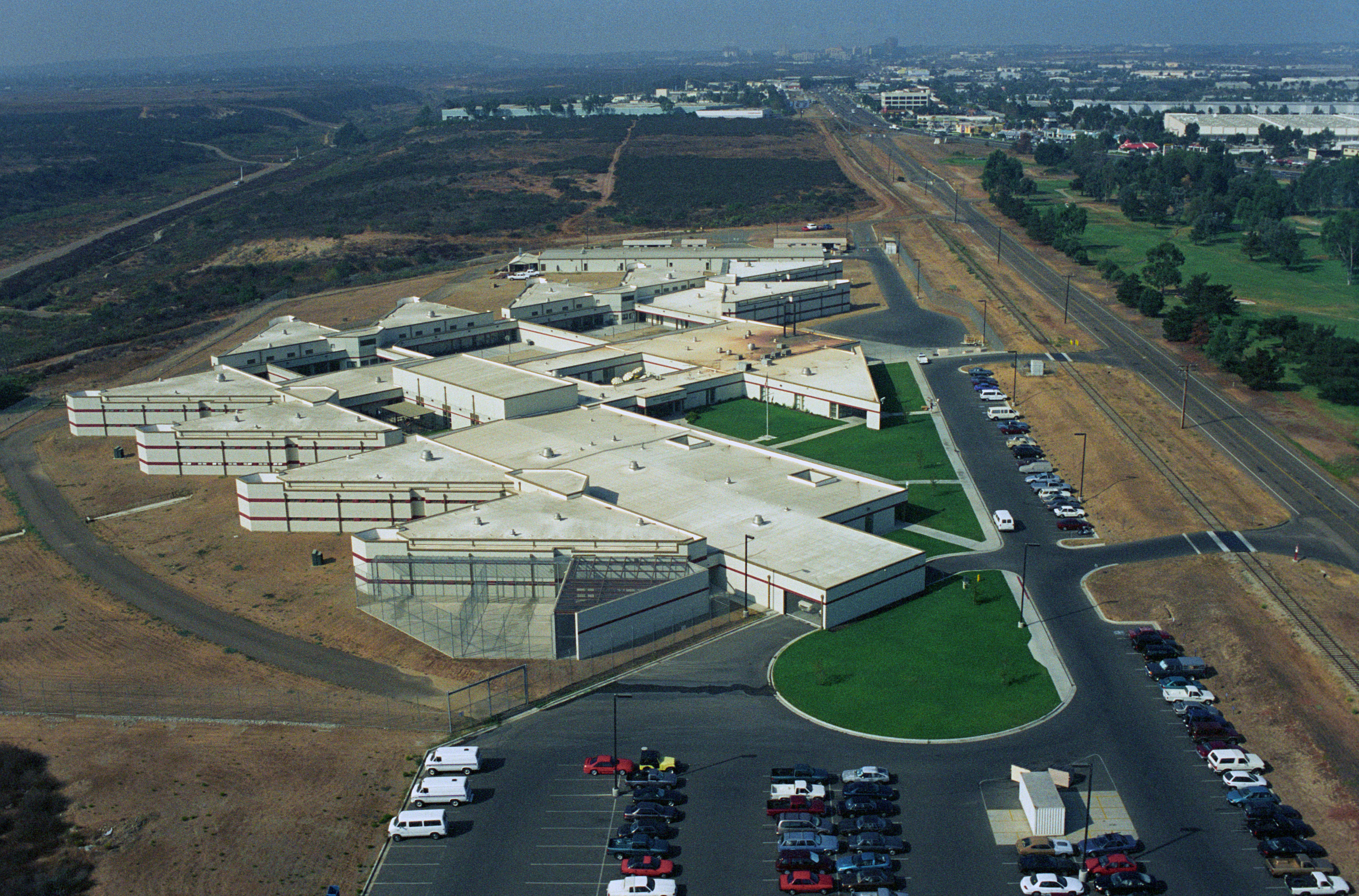
Naval Consolidated Brig, Miramar (1995)

In March 1996, the United States Department of Justice entered into an agreement with the U.S. Navy and a private jail firm and began to use a section of the brig for illegal immigrants who had been deported for criminal convictions, mostly drug crimes, and had been re-arrested for re-entering the United States. The U.S. military allocated cell space to the U.S. Marshals Service so that agency could operate a civilian facility, the Miramar Federal Detention Facility, within the brig. The U.S. Department of Justice had begun to target illegal immigrants who had criminal records. As a result, jails in the San Diego area became overcrowded. Metropolitan Correctional Center, San Diego, had been overcrowded for a long period of time leading up to 1996.

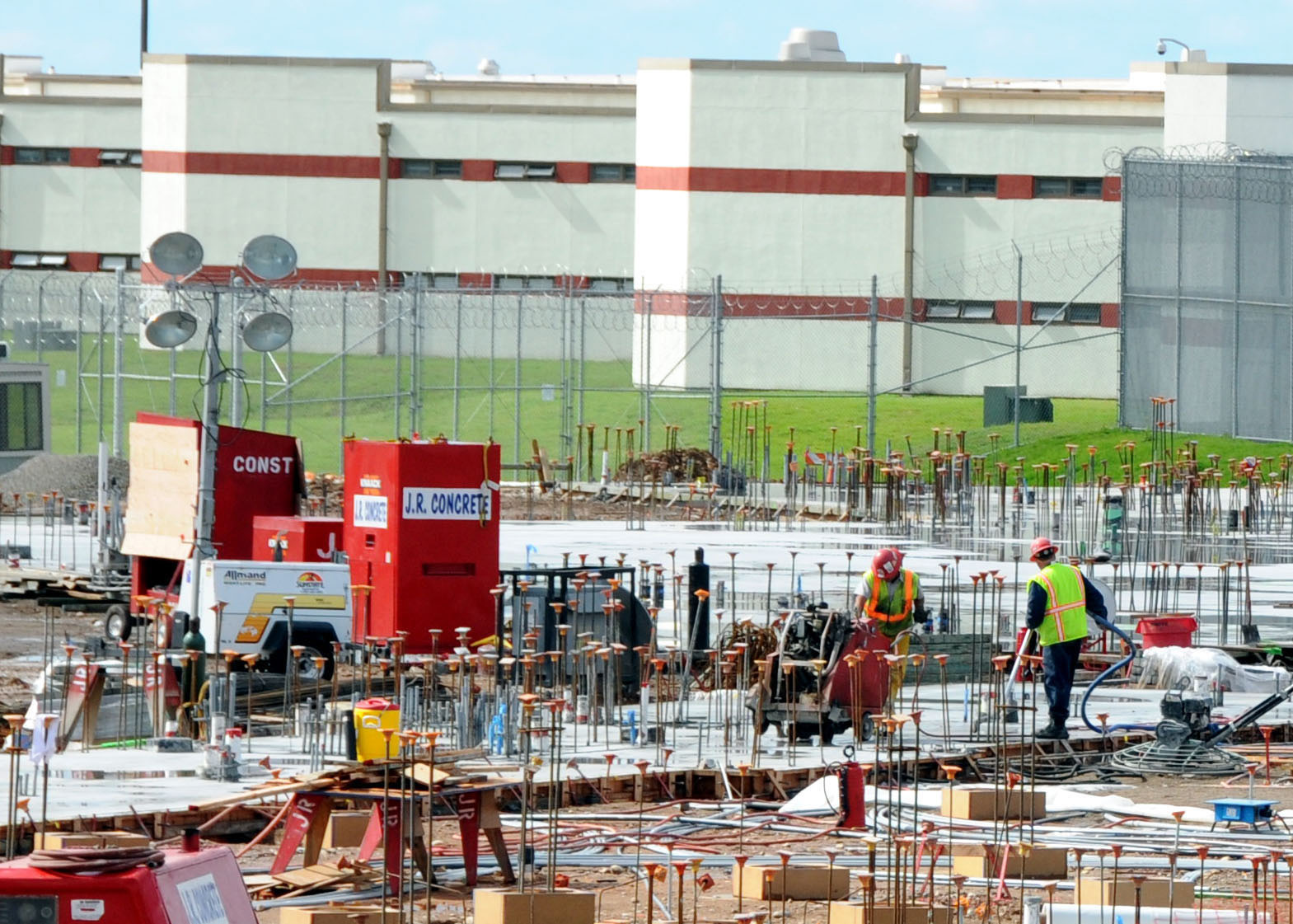
Construction of additional space at the Miramar Brig in 2010

Within two weeks of the move, on March 29 of that year, prisoners rioted, setting fires inside their housing units. The prisoners were upset over a lack of commissary privileges, and a perceived low quality of television service, so they obscured a surveillance camera with a blanket and set fire to mattresses. The fire inflicted $500,000 worth of property damage. Of 174 prisoners involved, 12 were hospitalized. $1.5 million was spent to care for the injured prisoners. Ten Mexican citizens and one Costa Rican citizen received charges of damaging federal government property and conspiracy. The civilian prisoners were transferred to civilian facilities. During that year the secretary of the Navy said that Miramar will never again be used to house illegal immigrants, the civilian population sent to Miramar. Randy "Duke" Cunningham, a member of the United States House of Representatives who had opposed the housing of illegal immigrants in the facility, said that the move was a "victory for San Diegans" because putting illegal immigrants in the brig placed national security in danger. Illegal immigrants who would have been sent to Miramar instead were sent to jails in Imperial County, California; Kern County, California; and Arizona. As a result, the parties that handled the transportation received millions of dollars in transportation revenue.

In 2003, it became the only American military prison to accept women.

In 2010, the facility was expanded 98,000 square feet (9,100 m^{2}) to accommodate an additional 200 prisoners before February 2011. The expansion, designed by Clark Construction and KMD Architects, included 120 cells for men and 80 cells for women. The women's housing unit was designed differently from the men's unit. The expansion also included a prisoner processing center, a kitchen, a mess hall and multipurpose room, a visitor center, an entrance lobby, classrooms, and conference rooms. A separate vocational building was established. The total expansion had a cost of $28 million. On February 4, 2011, a celebration for the expansion was held with a ribbon-cutting ceremony.

== Notable inmates ==
- Lynndie England and Sabrina Harman, perpetrators of the Abu Ghraib torture and prisoner abuse
- Eddie Gallagher, former U.S. Navy SEAL, was detained at Miramar during his lengthy pre-trial confinement before his court-martial for possible Law of Armed Conflict (LOAC) violations committed while a chief petty officer. He was later found not guilty of the most serious charges, and was only convicted of mistreatment of corpses, when he and other SEALs posed for pictures with a recently deceased ISIL member.
- Robin Long, the first member of the U.S. military to be deported from Canada (since the Vietnam War) after having deserted there.

== See also ==
- List of U.S. military prisons
