= Pierre Chareau =

French architect and designer

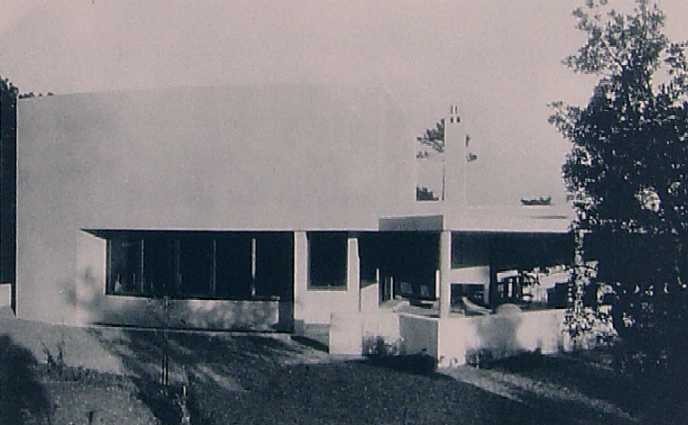
Clubhouse of Beauvallon golf course, built in Sainte-Maxime in 1926-1927

Maison de Verre 1928-1932

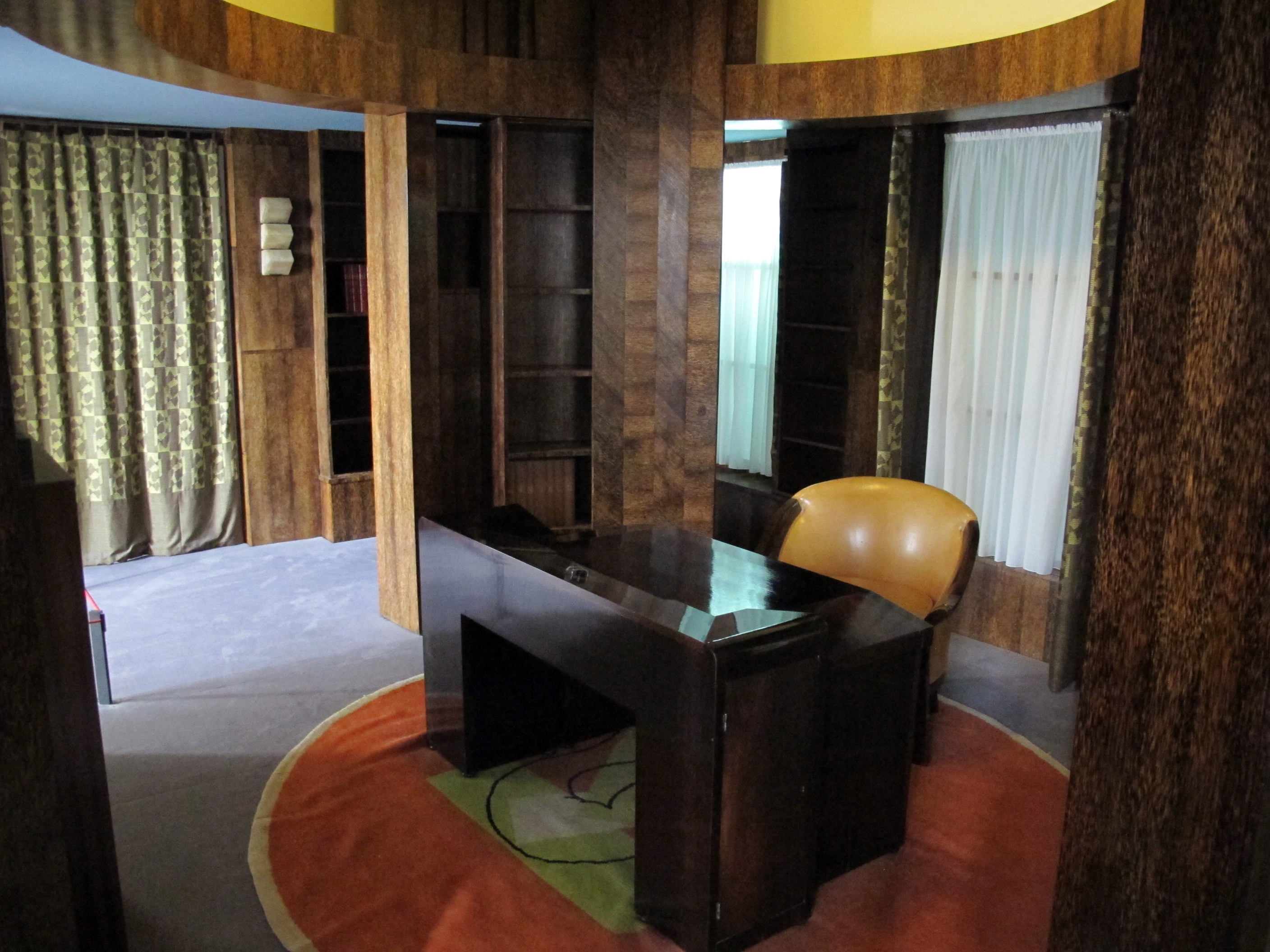
Bureau-bibliothèque de Pierre Chareau, Musée des Arts Décoratifs, Paris

Pierre Chareau (4 August 1883 – 24 August 1950) was a French architect and designer.

== Early life ==
Chareau was born in Bordeaux, France. He apprenticed at a Paris-based British furniture manufacturer, Waring & Gillow, after he failed his entrance exams to the Ecole des Beaux-Arts.

== Work ==
Chareau designed the first house in France made of steel and glass, the Maison de Verre.

Chareau was a member of Congrès International d'Architecture Moderne.

== Move to United States ==
Chareau and his wife fled Nazi-occupied Paris to Marseilles and Morocco and eventually settled in the New York. Robert Motherwell commissioned a house in the Hamptons, which would be Chareau's last. Unable to secure another commission, he and his wife survived on the income she made from giving cooking lessons. Though he made efforts to show his work at MOMA and at the Musee National d'Art Moderne in Paris, he died in 1950, relatively unknown and penniless.

== Exhibitions ==
In 2016, The Jewish Museum in New York City mounted the exhibition, Pierre Chareau: Modern Architecture and Design which explored the architect's work.
