= William Durland =

American politician and lawyer from Virginia

William R. Durland

Member of the Virginia House of Delegates for Fairfax County, Virginia
- In office January 12, 1966 – January 1969 Serving with Clive L. DuVal II, Dorothy S. McDiarmid, Paul Reiber, Laurence A. Short, Carrington Williams, Vince Callahan, Robert A. Maloney, Stanford Parris
- Preceded by: Guy O. Farley, Jr.
- Succeeded by: David A. Sutherland

Personal details
- Born: 1931 (age 94–95)
- Party: Democrat, Independent
- Profession: Politician, lawyer

William Durland (born 1931) is an American politician, attorney, environmental and peace activist, author and educator who served in the Virginia House of Delegates and later in Colorado local offices.

== Early life and education ==
Durland was born in New York City and raised in Scarsdale, New York. He graduated from Scarsdale High School in 1949, then attended Bucknell University and received a bachelor's degree with honors in history and political science in 1953, and married the following year. Durland attended Georgetown Law School after his military service described below, where he worked on the staff of the Georgetown Law Journal and graduated with an LLB in 1959, then continued graduate legal studies at the George Washington Law School and Georgetown Law Center and received a J.D. in 1967. Raised Catholic, after his legislative service discussed below, Durland became a member of the Religious Society of Friends (Quakers). In 1975 Durland earned an M.A. in Biblical Theology and Nonviolence from Notre Dame University and in 1977 he received a PhD. from Union Graduate School at Antioch College in Political and Religious Philosophy.

== Career ==
After his college graduation, Durland joined the National Security Agency as an intelligence analyst. Durland served overseas in the U.S. Army Medical Service Corps from 1954 to 1957 during the Korean conflict. He joined the reserves during his law school studies and remained in the U.S. Army JAG Corps for a decade, during the Vietnam War. He was admitted to the bar in Wisconsin and the District of Columbia in 1960, the Supreme Court of the United States in 1963 and the Virginia state bar in 1965. Durland's first job after law school was as an assistant to the Director of the United States Commission on International Rules of Judicial Procedure, and he also worked as a trial attorney for the Food and Drug Administration before entering private practice in 1962.

=== Politician ===
Bill Durland held numerous positions in the Democratic Party between 1958 and 2023, initially in Virginia, and later in Colorado. During the 1960s he lived in Fairfax County, then partly rural and where the population boomed from about 260,000 people to more than 1 million people in the 2000s. After the U.S. Supreme Court disallowed legislative apportionment of the Virginia General Assembly which led to under-representation of northern Virginia, Durland won election to the Virginia House of Delegates as one of the delegates representing (part-time) the 27th district, then a multi-member district which included Fairfax County as well as Fairfax City and part of Falls Church, and won re-election once before deciding against seeking another term in order to concentrate on his varied legal practice and to co-found with J. Edward Guinan the Center for Creative Non-Violence, later the Community for Creative Nonviolence. Thus Durland served as a legislator from 1966 to 1969. Durland considered his achievements as creating Mason Neck State Park (the 5000 acres becoming Northern Virginia's first state park, as well as preserving critical habitat for bald eagles), passing historic sites legislation as well as a governmental conflict of interest law, various laws protecting children and consumers, and co-sponsoring constitutional revisions in the new Virginia Constitution adopted in 1970. After his decision not to seek re-election, four new Republicans joined the two already seated representing District 27, and only Democrats Carrington Williams, Dorothy McDiarmid and Clive DuVal were re-elected. In 1972 Durland ran unsuccessfully as an Independent for the 8th Virginia congressional district, but both he and the Democratic candidate, former Marine and long-term Fairfax prosecutor Robert F. Horan Jr., lost to Republican Stanford Parris.

In 1990 Durland was elected as the Vice-Mayor and Council member of the Town of Cokedale, Colorado, and in 1995 was elected as a member of the City Council of the city of Trinidad, Colorado.

=== Lawyer and educator ===
William Durland practiced in the areas of international, constitutional and human right laws for more than five decades.

In 2008 Durland served on the defense teams of Robin Long and Daniel Sandate the first two U.S. soldiers deported from Canada, after having fled to Canada to avoid fighting in the Iraq War.

=== Educator and author ===
Durland has at various times taught philosophy, history and government at Purdue University, Villanova University, the University of Notre Dame, Catholic University and in the Colorado Community College System. He also taught peace and justice courses at the Pendle Hill Quaker Study and Contemplation Center in Pennsylvania from 1985 to 1988.

His books on theology and Nonviolence include God or Nations Radial Theology for the Religious Peace Movement (1989), No King but Caesar (1975), People pay for peace: A military tax refusal guide for radical religious pacifists and people of conscience (1980), Ethical Issues. A Search for the Contemporary Conscience (1975), The apocalyptic witness: A radical calling for our own times (1988), and The illegality of war (1983).

Durland has also written more than 10 plays.

=== Activist ===
Durland became a peace and justice activist in 1958, while studying law. With J. Edward Guinan he co-founded the Community for Creative Nonviolence (1970, Washington D.C.), The Matthew 25 Free Health Clinic and Nonviolence Center (1976, Ft. Wayne, Ind.), The National Center on Law and Pacifism (1978, Philadelphia), and The Center on Law and Human Rights (2003, Colorado Springs, Colorado). He also served as director of the Virginia Mental Health Association, Virginia Retarded Children's Association and the Virginia Citizens Consumer Council, and was the chairman of the Conservation Committee for Mason Neck.

In 2002, Bill and his wife Genie traveled to Palestine and Iraq as part of delegations from Christian Peacemaker Teams.

== Personal life ==
He lives in Littleton, Colorado with his second wife, Eugenia Smith Durland, and they have one son. He also has two sons and a daughter from his marriage to Leona Semenas.
