= Aldershot military prison =

Former 'Glasshouse' military prison

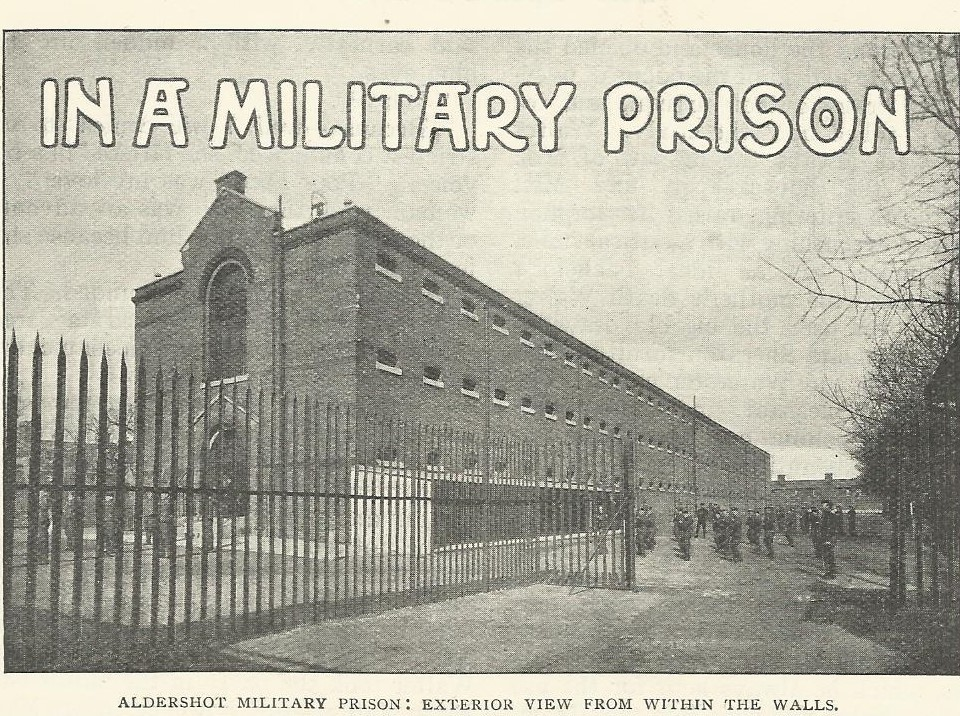
The Aldershot Glasshouse in 1908

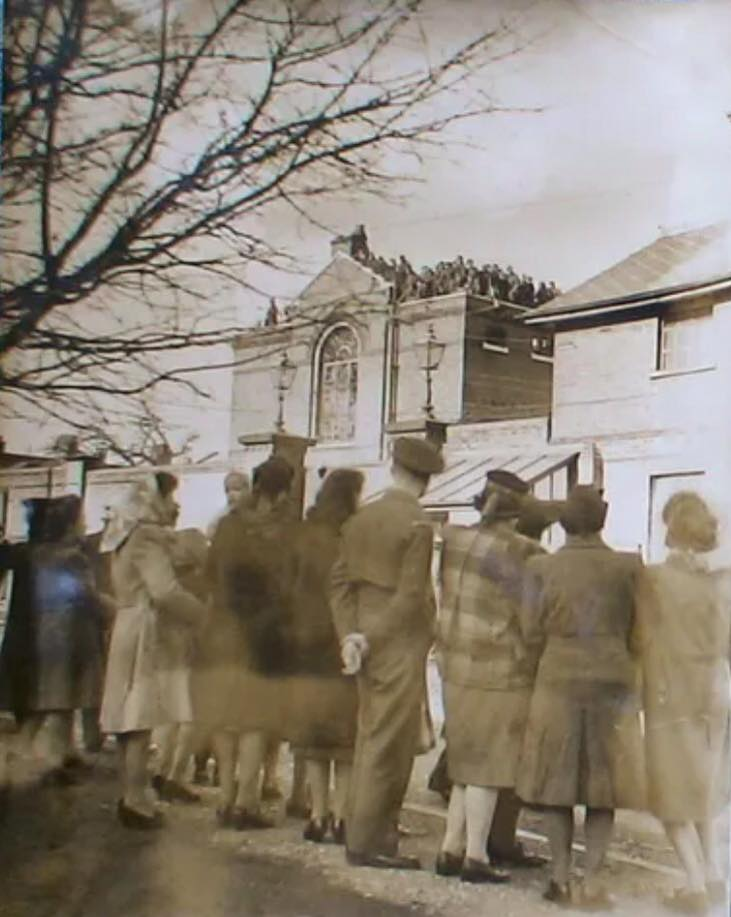
Troops rioting on the roof of the 'Glasshouse' in February 1946

Aldershot military prison, known as the Glasshouse on account of its glazed roof, was the military prison in Aldershot in Hampshire from 1870 until it was burned down during riots in February 1946 and was finally demolished in 1958.

== History ==
The Glasshouse was one of the most imposing buildings in the 19th-century Aldershot military town. Built in 1870 to house soldiers sentenced for military offences, the building derived its name from its large, glass lantern roof. The term glasshouse has since become synonymous with all military prison establishments but it has its origins in Aldershot.

Aldershot's first military prison opened in 1856 and was made up of standard wooden barrack huts in the North and South Camp and holding around 200 prisoners. An 1864 report from the Inspector of Military Prisons called for the rebuilding of the military prison in cell formation 'to prevent the evils of association'. Re-building of Aldershot's military prison started in 1870 at an estimated cost of about £6,000. Described in Sheldrake's Guide to Aldershot as a 'large aggressive looking building', the new prison had been constructed in the area bordered on its north and south sides by North Road and Redvers Buller Road, and to the west by James Road. The new three-storey building was very similar to conventional Victorian civil prisons such as Wormwood Scrubs and was originally designed to house 165 inmates, considerably fewer than the wooden huts of Aldershot's original prison. Additional building work was carried out to the main buildings in 1880 at a cost of about £5000 while the main cell block was extended after 1885 to create a further 20 cells on each floor.

In the 1930s, a medical inspection unit and gymnasium were added. By 1946, the prison held between 400 and 500 prisoners which was more than double the number it had originally been designed to accommodate. This severe overcrowding caused riots on 23/24 February 1946 which led to the destruction of the main building while further damage was caused by the water from high-pressure hoses used to stop the riot. In 1948, the War Office considered rebuilding the 'Glasshouse' at an estimated cost of £18,000 but eventually decided against it resulting in the prison being demolished in early 1958.
