= Glasshouse (British Army) =

Military prison in the United Kingdom

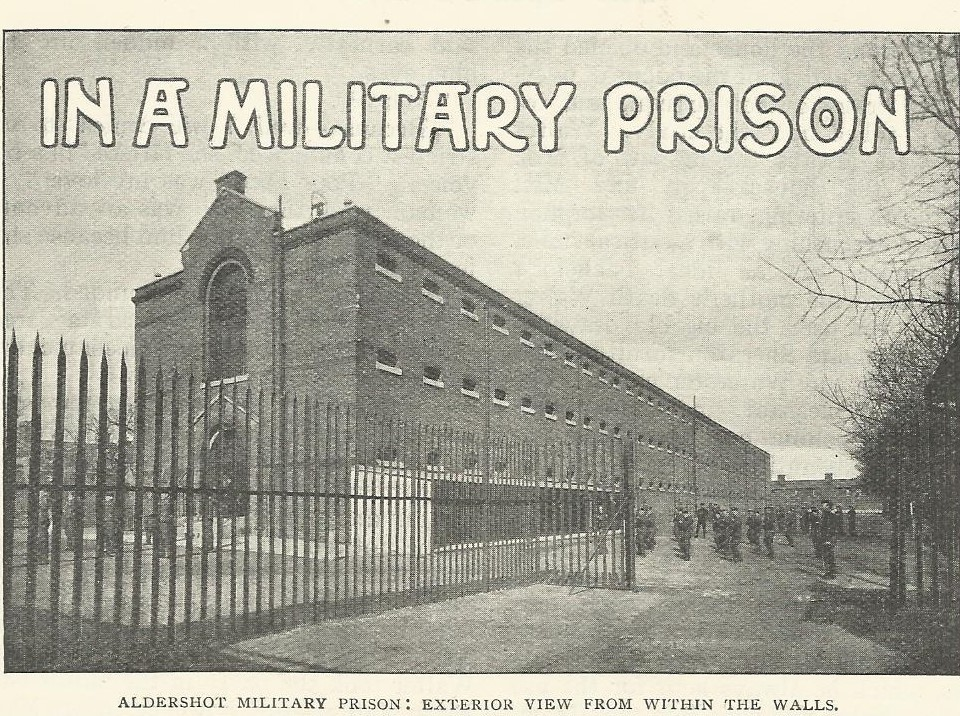
The Aldershot Glasshouse in 1908

A glasshouse, or the glasshouse is a military prison in the United Kingdom.

== History ==
The first military prisons were established in 1844. The term Glasshouse originated from the Aldershot military prison, Aldershot, which had a glazed roof. Over time, the word glasshouse came to be applied to all military prisons. Aldershot military prison, which was also called the Detention Barracks, had begun as several barracks in 1856, before being replaced by a single, large building, modelled on the then civilian prison system in 1870. This building was destroyed by fire in a riot of 1946 when the prisoners (labeled as "mutineers" in the press) were protesting about their rations and conditions given that the Second World War was over.

Glasshouses gained a reputation for brutality, as depicted in Allan Campbell McLean's novel The Glass House and the Sidney Lumet film The Hill. Today, the British Armed Forces have only one remaining correction facility, the Military Corrective Training Centre (MCTC) at Colchester. Whilst the MCTC is not a prison, it is inspected by the Justice Inspectorate and any service person convicted of a crime at Court Martial that warrants a prison sentence, will be sent to the MCTC for processing, before being sent to a civilian prison.

The MCTC at Colchester was featured in a Channel 4 documentary in 1994 (The Glasshouse) which prompted an early day motion in the House of Commons over the inmates having access to ammunition and weapons (as part of normal military drill.) This was because the government at the time, were seeking to use the MCTC as a model for youth custody in civilian prisons.

== List of glasshouses ==
- Aldershot military prison
- HMP Barlinnie
- HMP Northallerton
- HMP Shepton Mallet
- MCTC Colchester
