= The Hill (1965 film) =

1965 film by Sidney Lumet

- original film poster
- Directed by: Sidney Lumet
- Screenplay by: Ray Rigby
- Story by: Ray Rigby; R.S. Allen
- Produced by: Kenneth Hyman
- Starring: Sean Connery; Harry Andrews; Ian Bannen; Alfred Lynch; Ossie Davis; Roy Kinnear; Jack Watson; Ian Hendry; Michael Redgrave
- Cinematography: Oswald Morris
- Edited by: Thelma Connell
- Production company: Seven Arts Productions
- Distributed by: Metro-Goldwyn-Mayer
- Release dates: 22 May 1965 (Cannes); 17 June 1965 (UK)
- Running time: 123 minutes
- Country: United Kingdom
- Language: English
- Budget: $2.5 million
- Box office: $4.3 million

The Hill is a 1965 British prison drama war film directed by Sidney Lumet and distributed by Metro-Goldwyn-Mayer. It depicts the physical and psychological power struggles of a British military prison in North Africa, near the end of the Second World War. The title refers to a large mound prisoners are made to climb, repeatedly. The film stars Sean Connery, Harry Andrews, Ian Bannen, Ossie Davis, Ian Hendry, Alfred Lynch, Roy Kinnear and Michael Redgrave.

The film premiered at the 1965 Cannes Film Festival, where it won the Best Screenplay Award (for Ray Rigby). It was nominated for six BAFTA Awards, including Best Film and Outstanding British Film, and won Best Cinematography (for Oswald Morris). Harry Andrews' performance was nominated for Best British Actor, and won the National Board of Review Award for Best Supporting Actor.

== Plot ==
In a British Army "glasshouse" (military prison) in the Libyan desert, prisoners convicted of service offences such as insubordination, being drunk while on duty, going AWOL or petty theft are subjected to repetitive drill routines as a punishment in the blazing desert heat. The arrival of five new prisoners slowly leads to a clash with the camp authorities, as well as an internal power struggle between brutal ex-civilian prison guard Staff Sergeant Williams, humane Staff Sergeant Harris, and Regimental Sergeant Major Wilson.

Roberts is a former squadron sergeant major from the Royal Tank Regiment, convicted of assaulting his commanding officer after orders to lead a suicidal attack. Roberts arrives with McGrath, a hard northerner sentenced for drunkenness, and assaulting Military Policemen; Stevens, a timid and naive Army office clerk jailed for being AWOL; Bartlett, a spiv who shirks active service who has been convicted of selling stolen tyres to the Arabs; and King, a light-hearted West Indian sentenced for drunk and disorderly conduct and stealing whisky from the officers' mess. Roberts scorns Williams' brutality and challenges his authority. Like Roberts, the RSM is a career soldier and sees his duty as breaking down failed soldiers, then building them back up again "into men".

Staff Sergeant Williams' ambition fuels his cruel treatment of the prisoners and he openly seeks promotion. The RSM dryly points out Williams volunteered for North Africa just as the Germans began bombing London (where Williams previously worked). Williams tries to impress the RSM with a late-night drinking contest. Staff Sergeant Harris is the conscience of the prison who sympathises with the men. The RSM considers him too lenient, while the officers, both the commandant and the medical officer, take their duties casually.

Williams singles out Bartlett and Stevens, the two weakest members of the group, and pushes Stevens' physical punishments to the point he dies from running up and down the artificial hill constructed in the camp. The prisoners rise in protest when Roberts accuses Williams of murder with King's support. The RSM faces down the general prison population, while Williams gangs up on Roberts in an empty cell and beats him. Williams tries to get Roberts' broken foot seen by the medical officer but the RSM prevents it and forces him to drill. King protests, and after being subjected to racial abuse by the RSM, refuses to wear his uniform or submit to army discipline.

After the RSM attempts to blackmail the medical officer by pointing out he had rated Stevens fit for punishment, the medical officer and Harris agree to report Williams and the RSM for abuse. Roberts is left alone in a cell thinking they have won until Williams appears to beat him again. When King and McGrath intervene, they attack Williams as the film fades to black, while Roberts desperately pleads with them to stop, shouting "you'll muck it up!"

== Cast ==
- Sean Connery as Trooper Joe Roberts
- Harry Andrews as Regimental Sergeant Major Bert Wilson
- Ian Bannen as Staff Sergeant Charlie Harris
- Ian Hendry as Staff Sergeant Williams
- Alfred Lynch as Private George Stevens
- Ossie Davis as Private Jacko King
- Roy Kinnear as Private Monty Bartlett
- Jack Watson as Private Jock McGrath
- Michael Redgrave as the Medical Officer
- Norman Bird as the Prison Commandant, Major Horace Appleby
- Neil McCarthy as Staff Sergeant Burton
- Howard Goorney as Trooper Walters
- Tony Caunter as Trooper Martin

== Production ==
The film was based on a screenplay by Ray Rigby, who wrote for TV and had spent time in military prison. Movie rights were bought by Seven Arts Productions, which had a production deal with MGM. Producer Kenneth Hyman arranged for Rigby's script to be rewritten by other people, but when American filmmaker Sidney Lumet came on board as director, Lumet went back to Rigby's original draft. He and Rigby did cut out around 100 pages of material before filming.

"There really isn't a lot of story", said Lumet. "It's all character – a group of men, prisoners and jailers alike, driven by the same motive force, fear."

Sean Connery agreed to play the lead because it represented such a change of pace from James Bond. "It is only because of my reputation as Bond that the backers put up the money for The Hill", he said.

Lumet says he told Connery before filming began that, "'I'm going to make brutal demands of you, physically and emotionally', and he knew I'm not a director who has too much respect for 'stars' as such. The result is beyond my hopes. He is real and tough and not at all smooth or nice. In a way he's a 'heavy' but the real heavy is the Army."

Filming took place in Almería, Spain starting 8 September 1964. An old Spanish fort in Málaga was used for the prison. Many people associated with the production had regarded the filming as pleasant, despite difficult conditions: Temperatures went above 46 °C (114 °F) and nearly all the cast and crew became ill, even though thousands of gallons of fresh water were brought in.

In a manner similar to Lumet’s previous film 12 Angry Men, also an analysis of the justice system, The Hill uses a diegetic musical score, i.e. sounds, music and effects unheard by the cast.

== Release ==
The film premiered in-competition at the 1965 Cannes Film Festival, where it was nominated for the Palme d'Or and won Best Screenplay (Ray Rigby). It had its first theatrical release in France on June 11, 1965, before being released in the United Kingdom on June 17.

== Reception ==
The Hill did not perform well in cinemas, although it was well-received by critics.

A review in Variety called the film "harsh, sadistic and brutal entertainment, superbly acted by an all-male cast, and made without any concessions to officialdom. ... Sidney Lumet's forceful and authoritative direction gives added power to the production, and Oswald Morris's stark black and white lensing adds to the tough realism."

The Monthly Film Bulletin wrote "Strikingly shot in clear, clean lines by Ossie Morris, this subject, at least until the frenzied final stages when the plot takes over entirely, seems to provide the ideal outlet for Sidney Lumet's discursive and fastidious talent."

The performances of the cast were widely praised. The Radio Times Guide to Films wrote: "When Sidney Lumet cast Sean Connery in The Hill, the former 007 cast his fake hair to the wind for the first time." In a comparatively negative review, Leslie Halliwell called the film "Lurid melodrama which descends fairly quickly into black farce with a number of sweaty actors outshouting each other. Enjoyable on this level when you can hear the dialogue through the poor sound recording."

On the review aggregator website Rotten Tomatoes, 78% of 9 critics' reviews are positive.

=== Awards and nominations ===
Institution	Year	Category	Nominee	Result
BAFTA Award	1966	Best Film	Sidney Lumet	Nominated
BAFTA Award	1966	Outstanding British Film	Sidney Lumet	Nominated
BAFTA Award	1966	Best British Screenplay	Ray Rigby	Nominated
BAFTA Award	1966	Best British Actor	Harry Andrews	Nominated
BAFTA Award	1966	Best British Cinematography	Oswald Morris	Won
BAFTA Award	1966	Best British Art Direction	Herbert Smith	Nominated
Cannes Film Festival	1965	Palme d'Or	Sidney Lumet	Nominated
Cannes Film Festival	1965	Best Screenplay	Ray Rigby	Won
National Board of Review	1965	Best Supporting Actor	Harry Andrews	Won
Writers' Guild of Great Britain	1966	Best British Dramatic Screenplay	Ray Rigby	Won

=== Aftermath ===
Lumet and Connery so enjoyed their collaboration that they would subsequently work together on four films: The Anderson Tapes, The Offence, Murder on the Orient Express, and Family Business. The Hill was also the first of seven films American director Lumet made in the UK.

== Novelization ==
Ray Rigby published a novel of the story in 1965.

== Home media ==
The Hill was released to DVD by Warner Home Video on 5 June 2007 as a Region 1 widescreen DVD.
