= List of U.S. military prisons =

This is a list of U.S. military prisons and brigs operated by the US Department of Defense for prisoners and convicts from the United States military.

== Current military prisons ==
=== Joint Prisons (housing inmates from all military branches) ===
- United States Army Corrections Command operated facilities
  - United States Disciplinary Barracks, Fort Leavenworth, Leavenworth, Kansas
  - Midwest Joint Regional Correctional Facility, Fort Leavenworth, Leavenworth, Kansas
  - Northwest Joint Regional Correctional Facility, Joint Base Lewis-McChord, Fort Lewis, Washington
- Consolidated brigs operated by the United States Navy
  - Naval Consolidated Brig, Charleston, Joint Base Charleston South Annex, Hanahan, South Carolina
  - Naval Consolidated Brig, Chesapeake, Naval Support Activity Hampton Roads Northwest Annex, Chesapeake, Virginia
  - Naval Consolidated Brig, Miramar, Marine Corps Air Station Miramar, San Diego, California

=== United States Army ===
- United States Army Corrections Facility-Europe, Sembach Kaserne, Kaiserslautern, Germany
- Army Regional Confinement Facility, Camp Humphreys, USFK (U. S. Forces Korea), South Korea

=== United States Marine Corps ===
- Marine Corps Brig, Camp Pendleton, Marine Corps Base Camp Pendleton, California
- Marine Corps Brig, Camp Hansen, Camp Hansen, Okinawa, Japan
- Marine Corps Brig, Camp Lejeune, Marine Corps Base Camp Lejeune, North Carolina

=== United States Navy ===
- Waterfront Brigs/CCU
  - Naval Brig/CCU Jacksonville, Naval Air Station Jacksonville, Jacksonville, Florida
  - Naval Brig/CCU Norfolk, Naval Station Norfolk, Norfolk, Virginia
  - Naval Brig Yokosuka, U.S. Fleet Activities Yokosuka, Japan
  - Naval Brig Rota, Naval Station Rota, Spain
  - Naval Brig, Pearl Harbor, Joint Base Pearl Harbor–Hickam, Pearl Harbor, Hawaii
  - Navy Brig, Puget Sound, Puget Sound Naval Shipyard, Washington
- Pre-Trial Confinement Facilities/PCF
  - Pre-Trial Confinement Facility, Naval Station Great Lakes, North Chicago, Illinois
  - Pre-Trial Confinement Facility, Submarine Base New London, Connecticut
  - Pre-Trial Confinement Facility/Consolidated Confinement Unit, Commander, Fleet Activities Yokosuka, Japan
  - Pre-Trial Confinement Facility, Guantanamo Bay Naval Base, Guantanamo Bay, Cuba
- Detention Facilities
  - Submarine Base Kings Bay, Georgia
  - Naval Station San Diego, California
  - Joint Base Anacostia-Bolling, District of Columbia
  - Naval Air Station North Island, California
  - Naval Air Station Lemoore, California
  - Naval Air Station Meridian, Mississippi
  - Naval Air Station Corpus Christi, Texas
  - Commander Fleet Activities Sasebo, Japan
  - Commander Naval Activities Marianas, Guam
  - Naval Support Activity Naples
  - Naval Support Facility Diego Garcia
- Afloat Brigs
  - USS Nimitz (CVN-68)
  - USS Dwight D. Eisenhower (CVN-69)
  - USS Carl Vinson (CVN-70)
  - USS Theodore Roosevelt (CVN-71)
  - USS Abraham Lincoln (CVN-72)
  - USS George Washington (CVN-73)
  - USS John C. Stennis (CVN-74)
  - USS Harry S. Truman (CVN-75)
  - USS Ronald Reagan (CVN-76)
  - USS George H.W. Bush (CVN-77)
  - USS Gerald R. Ford (CVN-78)
  - USS Wasp (LHD-1)
  - USS Essex (LHD-2)
  - USS Kearsarge (LHD-3)
  - USS Boxer (LHD-4)
  - USS Bataan (LHD-5)
  - USS Iwo Jima (LHD-7)
  - USS Makin Island (LHD-8)
  - USS America (LHA 6)
  - USS Tripoli (LHA-7)

== Former or historical military prisons ==
- Army Regional Confinement Facility at Fort Carson, Colorado
- Army Regional Confinement Facility at Fort Knox, Kentucky (closed 2010)
- Army Regional Confinement Facility at Fort Sill, Oklahoma
- Marine Corps Brig, Camp Lejeune at Marine Corps Base Camp Lejeune, North Carolina
- Portsmouth Naval Prison on Portsmouth Naval Shipyard, Seavey Island, Maine (closed 1974)
- United States Disciplinary Barracks, Atlantic Branch at Castle Williams on Governors Island, New York City (closed 1965)
- United States Disciplinary Barracks, Central Branch at Jefferson Barracks, Missouri
- United States Disciplinary Barracks, East Central Branch, New Cumberland, Pennsylvania (closed 1959)
- United States Disciplinary Barracks, Eastern Branch at Green Haven, New York
- United States Disciplinary Barracks, Midwestern Branch at Fort Benjamin Harrison, Indianapolis, Indiana (closed 1947)
- United States Disciplinary Barracks, Northeastern Branch at Pine Camp, New York
- United States Disciplinary Barracks, Northern Branch, Milwaukee, Wisconsin (closed 1950)
- United States Disciplinary Barracks, Northwestern Branch at Fort Missoula, Montana (closed 1947)
- United States Disciplinary Barracks, Pacific Branch on Alcatraz Island, San Francisco Bay, California (closed 1933)
- United States Disciplinary Barracks, Southeastern Branch at Camp Gordon, Georgia
- United States Disciplinary Barracks, Southern Branch at North Camp Hood, Texas
- United States Disciplinary Barracks, Southwestern Branch at Camp Haan, California
- Fort Jefferson, Dry Tortugas, Florida (1861–1869)

== See also ==
- Federal Bureau of Prisons
- Incarceration in the United States
