= Maison de Verre =

Coordinates: 48.853910°N 2.327990°E

- Interactive map of the Maison de Verre area
- Alternative names: Maison Dalsace

General information
- Type: Residence/doctor's office
- Architectural style: Modern
- Location: Seventh district, 31 Rue Saint-Guillaume, Paris, France
- Construction started: 1928
- Completed: 1932
- Owner: Dr. Jean Dalsace

Technical details
- Structural system: Steel frame
- Material: Steel, glass block
- Floor count: 3

Design and construction
- Architects: Pierre Chareau, Bernard Bijvoet
- Other designers: Louis Dalbet

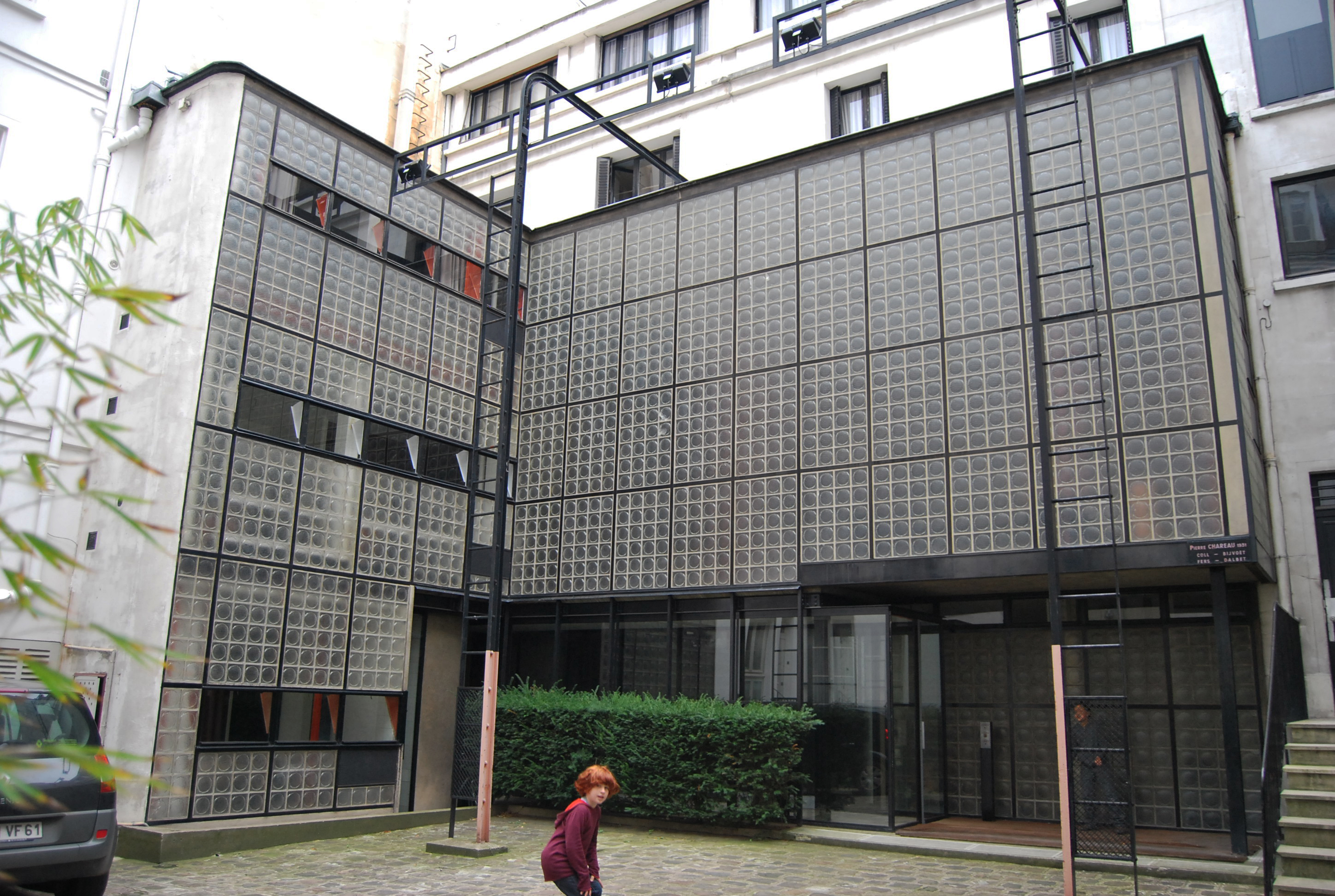
Maison de Verre (front left facade)

The Maison de Verre (French for House of Glass) was built from 1928 to 1932 in Paris, France. Constructed in the early modern style of architecture, the house's design emphasized three primary traits: honesty of materials, variable transparency of forms, and juxtaposition of "industrial" materials and fixtures with a more traditional style of home décor. (Note: "A steel grid supports the glass blocks mainly from the base, creating panels of 4 or 6 elements and using them according to the construction needs, and giving solidity to the areas where doors or windows were placed on the two facades. This structural framework was made with vertical uprights formed by two 30×15 mm U profiles welded to a 100×9 mm flat steel sheet designed to stiffen the facade. Two other horizontal U-sections identical to the first complete the frame that supports the glass blocks. In 1930 Chareau covered this steel frame with a mortar to materialize a surface without apparent joints, without visible skeleton, as if it were an unlimited transparent plane. However, in the 60s an intervention was carried out that affected the main façade, where this continuous coating was removed to place metal parts that enhanced the internal substructure by moving it outside. The floors of the main floor of the house are arranged in a cantilever on both the front and back façades. In all cases, the line of pillars immediately adjacent to the overhang is aligned parallel to the facades, that is, at a right angle to the relative position of the interior supports. Consequently, this produces space slots immediately behind the facades that accentuate, naturally, the transverse plane, inducing a reading of equivalent stratified layers, which covers all the remaining space.") The primary materials used were steel, glass, and glass block. Some of the notable "industrial" elements included rubberized floor tiles, bare steel beams, perforated metal sheet, heavy industrial light fixtures, and mechanical fixtures.

== Design ==
=== Designers ===
Maison de Verre's umbrella stand (at the entry) typical of the hand-crafted machine looking interior

The design was a collaboration among Pierre Chareau (a furniture and interiors designer), Bernard Bijvoet (a Dutch architect working in Paris since 1927) and Louis Dalbet (craftsman metalworker). Much of the intricate moving scenery of the house was designed on site as the project developed. The historian Henry-Russell Hitchcock as well as the designer Eileen Gray have declared that the architect was in fact 'that clever Dutch engineer (Bijvoet)'(Gray).

=== Plan ===
The external form is defined by translucent glass block walls, with select areas of clear glazing for transparency. Internally, spatial division is variable by the use of sliding, folding or rotating screens in glass, sheet or perforated metal, or in combination. Other mechanical components included an overhead trolley from the kitchen to dining room, a retracting stair from the private sitting room to Mme Dalsace's bedroom and complex bathroom cupboards and fittings.

The program of the home was somewhat unusual in that it included a ground-floor medical suite for Dr. Jean Dalsace. This variable circulation pattern was provided for by a rotating screen that hid the private stairs from patients during the day but framed the stairs at night.

== Construction ==
Construction was complicated as the building had to be completed without disturbing a tenant on part of the site. The building was built on the site of a much older building that the patron had purchased and intended to demolish. Much to his or her chagrin, however, the elderly tenant on the top floor of the building absolutely refused to sell, and so the patron was obliged to completely demolish the bottom three floors of the building and construct the Maison de Verre underneath, all without disturbing the original top floor.

== Use ==
Dr. Dalsace was a member of the French Communist Party who played a significant role in both anti-fascist and cultural affairs. In the mid-1930s, the Maison de Verre's double-height "salle de séjour" was transformed into a salon regularly frequented by Marxist intellectuals like Walter Benjamin as well as by Surrealist poets and artists such as Louis Aragon, Paul Éluard, Pablo Picasso, Max Ernst, Jacques Lipchitz, Jean Cocteau, Yves Tanguy, Joan Miró and Max Jacob. According to the American art historian Maria Gough, the Maison de Verre had a powerful influence on Walter Benjamin, especially on his constructivist - rather than expressionist - reading of Paul Scheerbart's utopian project for a future "culture of glass", for a "new glass environment [which] will completely transform mankind," as the latter expressed it in his 1914 treatise Glass Architecture. See in particular Benjamin's 1933 essay Erfahrung und Armut ("Experience and Poverty").

American architectural historian Robert Rubin bought the house from Dalsace family in 2006 to restore it and use it for his family residence. He allows a limited number of tours to the house.
