= Neve Tzedek Prison =

Israeli military prison

Coordinates: 32°19′40″N 34°55′45″E

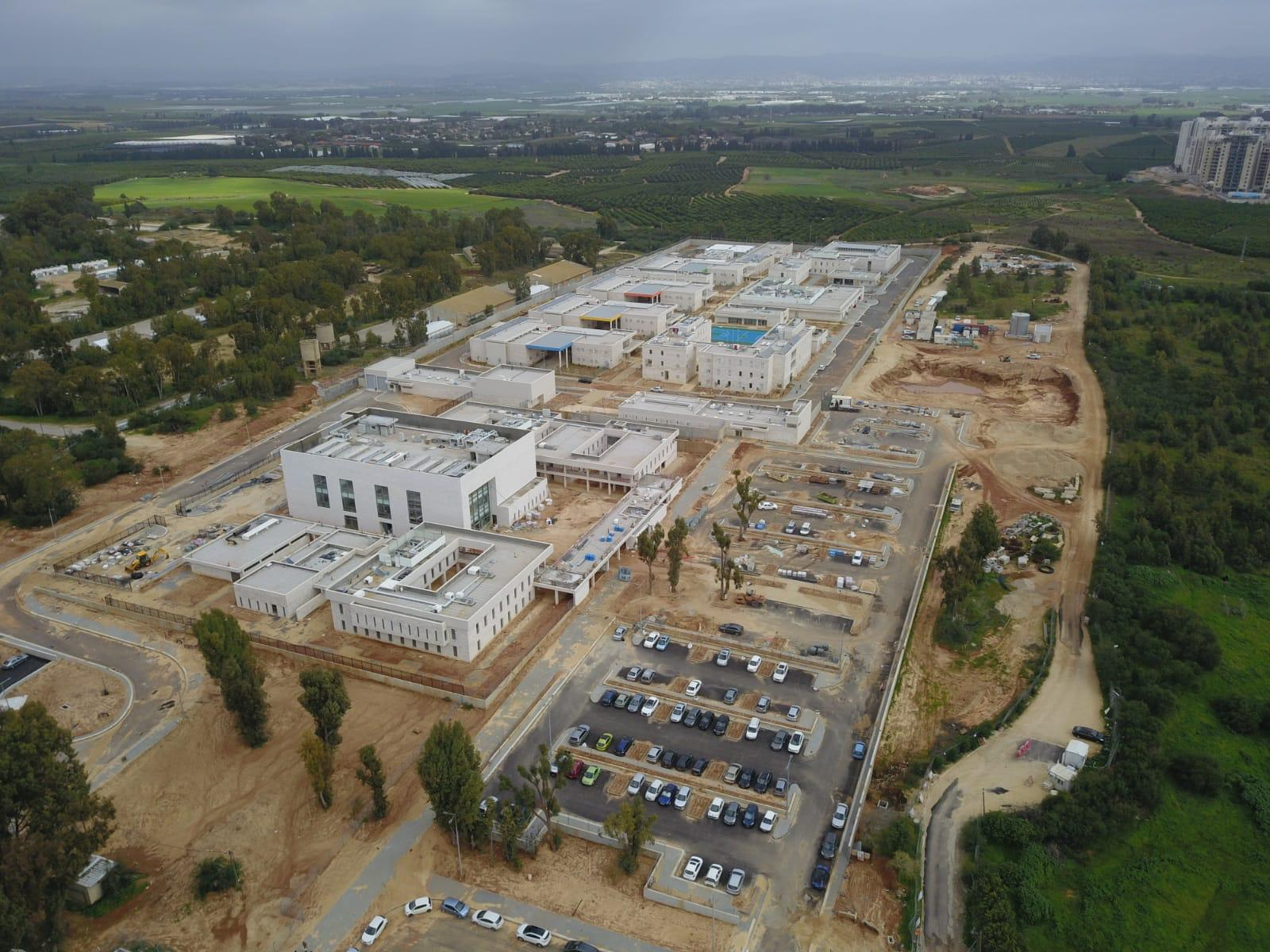
Neve Tzedek Prison

The Neve Tzedek Military Prison is an Israeli military prison within the Gur Camp complex near Kfar Yona established in 2021 and officially inaugurated on March 29, 2022. It replaced Prison Four and Prison Six.
