= Vaulted sidewalk =

Pavement type where the open area denotes a subterranean level

Vaulted sidewalks, also called sidewalk vaults, areaways, or hollow sidewalks, are sidewalks that are not placed directly on the ground. Rather, there is an empty space below them where the ground level used to be. This may happen where the street level has been raised over time, or where basements are extended, or as utility vaults.

Sidewalk vaults may be protected as historical architecture, or filling them required for planning permission.

== Chicago ==
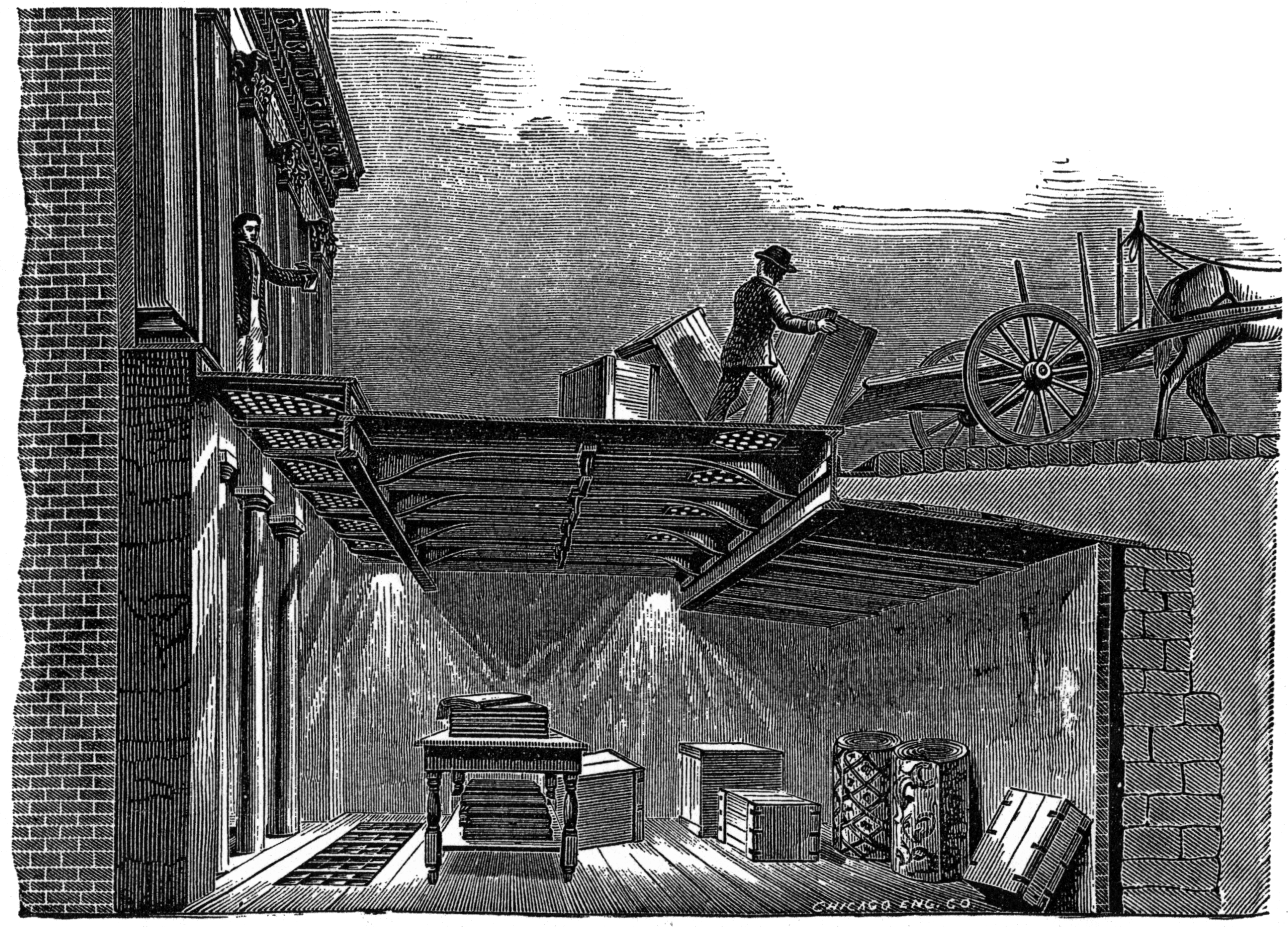
A sidewalk vault in Chicago, daylit through vault lights, 1880

The raising of Chicago started in 1855 as a response to the muddy conditions of the streets and because of epidemics of cholera. The raised streets needed new, raised sidewalks to match them. In the case of vaulted sidewalks, which might be 5 feet (1.5 m) or more over the original street level, a structure was built to hold a new sidewalk at the new street level, and an empty space was left between the original and the new sidewalks. This process gave building owners a choice: raise their buildings to the new street level, or relocate the main entrance to the second floor of the building to match the new street level. Many buildings chose the latter option, opting to use the vaulted area for storage. As recently as 2001 there were still over 2,000 vaulted sidewalks in Chicago

Today the old vaulted sidewalks are visible mostly during construction and cause increased costs of infrastructure maintenance.

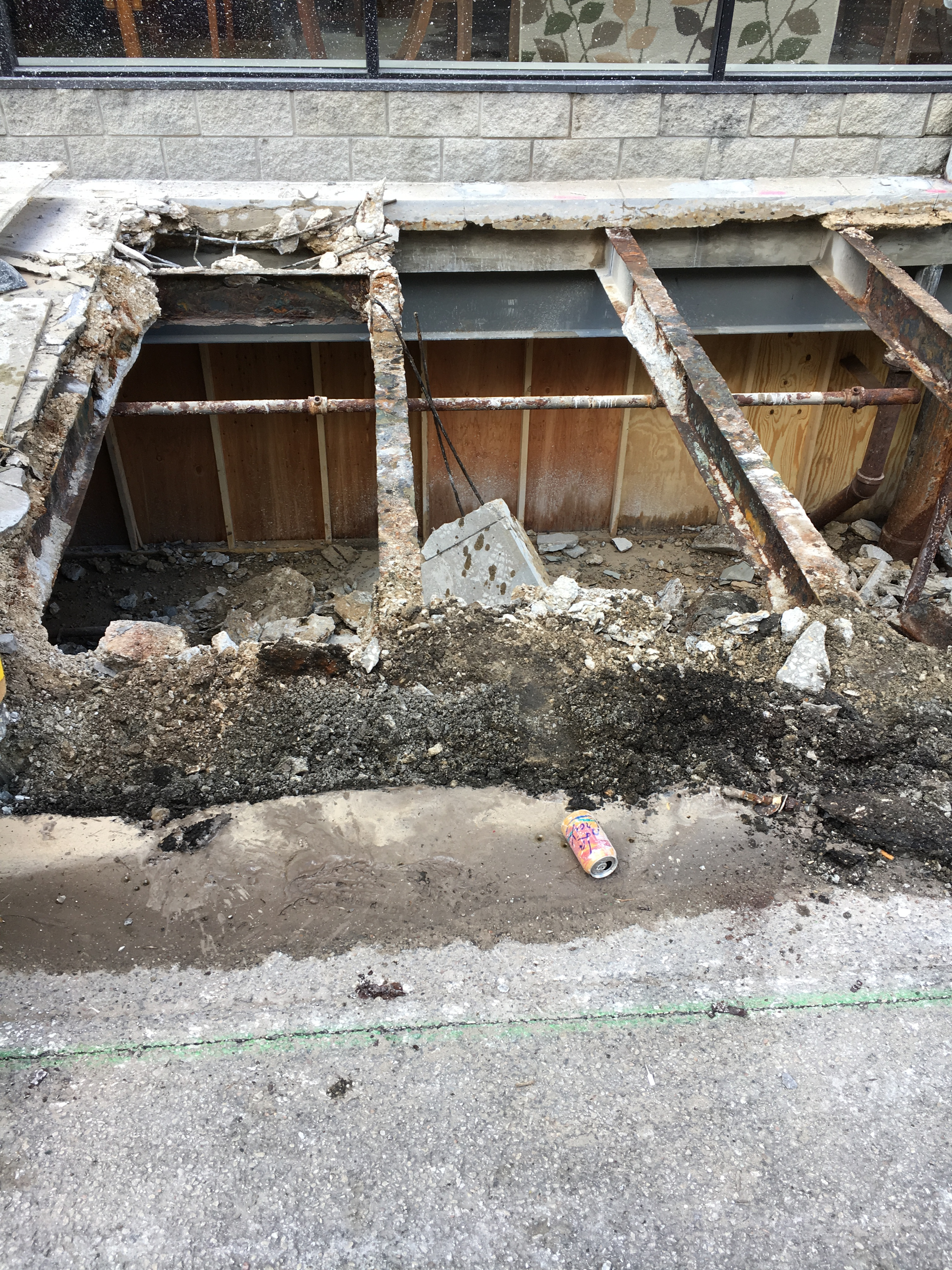
This is a vaulted sidewalk under construction in Chicago

== Milwaukee ==
As of 2022, several sidewalk vaults, or "hollow walks," remain in Milwaukee's Historic Third Ward and increase the cost of street and sidewalk reconstruction.

== New York ==
In New York, basements may extend beneath the sidewalk and drivers are warned "HOLLOW SIDEWALK, DO NOT PARK".

== Seattle ==
Some Seattle Underground sidewalks have vault lights, inset glass that trasmits sunlight to the lower level.

== Use for daylighting ==
Prism lighting allows sidewalk vaults to provide daylight to the basement.

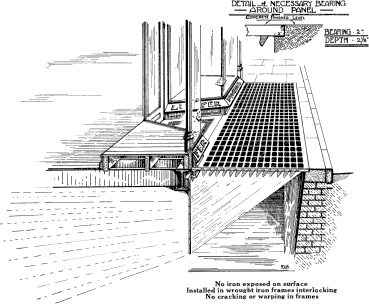
Two-stage refraction system for basement lighting; prism wall below center, shop above left. Note I-beam and masonry wall.

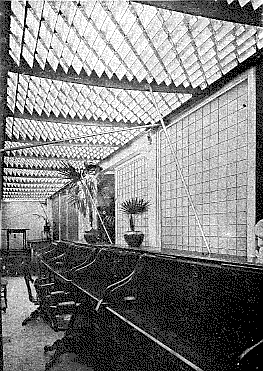
The same system used to light a salesroom inside a hollow sidewalk; prism wall is on the right, vault lights above.

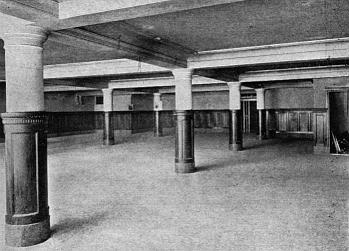
A basement daylit by sidewalk prisms (prisms out-of-shot to the left)
