= Anidolic lighting =

Indoor lighting

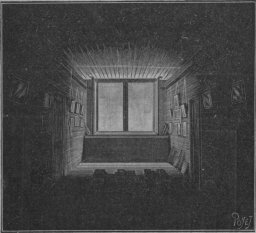
Uneven light from a window.

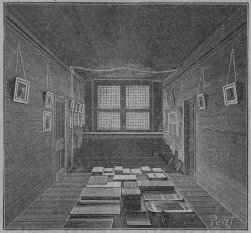
The same light, redistributed by prism tiles in the window.

Anidolic lighting systems use anidolic optical components to light rooms. Light redirected by these systems does not converge to a focal point or form an image, hence the name (from an, without, and eidolon, image).

Anidolic lighting uses non-imaging mirrors, lenses, and light guides to capture exterior sunlight and direct it deeply into rooms, while also scattering rays to avoid glare. The human eye's response to light is non-linear, so a more even distribution of the same amount of light makes a room appear brighter.

It is most challenging to effectively capture and redistribute light on cloudy, overcast days, when the sunlight is diffuse.

== Optical elements ==
Mirrors are typically parabolic or elliptical mirrors. Lenses are frequently made in multiple sections, like a Fresnel lens. Light guides include light pipes and anidolic ceilings.

== Lens systems ==
Lens systems use reflection and refraction within optical prisms to redirect daylight. Some forms of prism lighting have been used for centuries, and others are 21st-century.

Deck prisms were set into the upper decks of ships to light the decks below. Pavement lights were set into floors or sidewalks to let light into a basement below. The underside was frequently extended into prisms to direct and spread the light.

Prism tiles were designed to bend sunbeams coming through a window upwards, so that they would reach deeper into a room. They were placed in the upper parts of window frames, where they were called "transom lights".

Daylight redirecting window film (DRF) is a thin, flexible plastic version of the old glass prism tiles. It can be used as a substitute for opaque blinds.

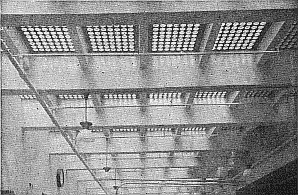
The basement under a sidewalk daylit with vault lights.

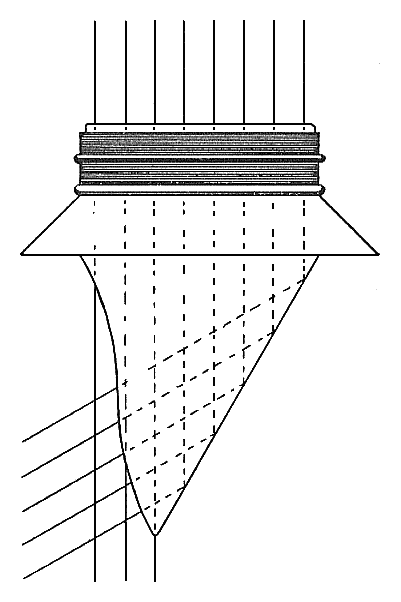
Single vault light pendant prism, showing total internal reflection. Multi-prism vault lights were also made.

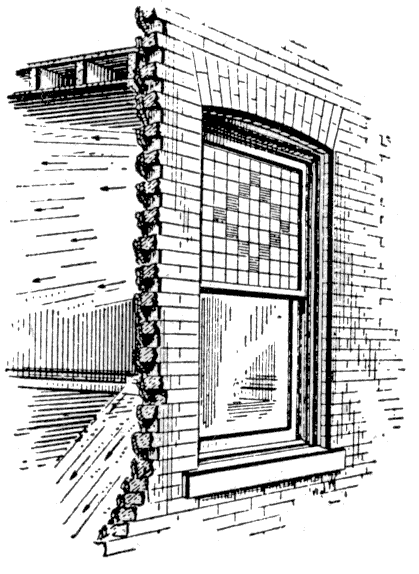
Transom light. The upper part of the window is made of prism tiles, so the light passing through them is bent.

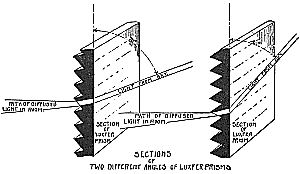
Two different prescriptions of prism tiles, showing their differing effects on the light

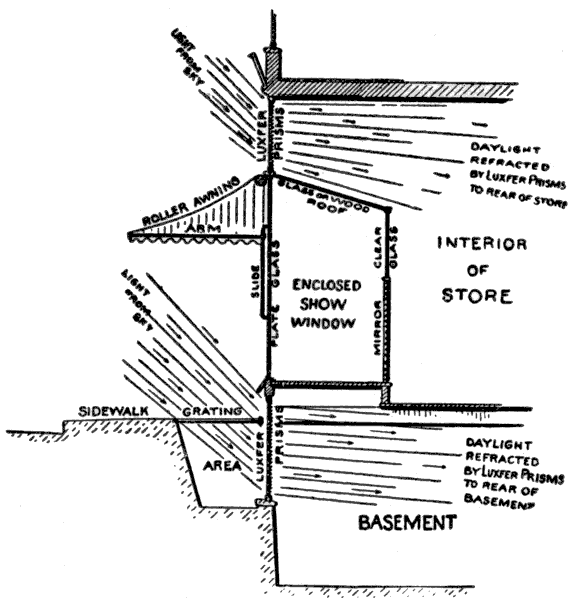
Daylighting a shop with a shop window using prism tile transoms

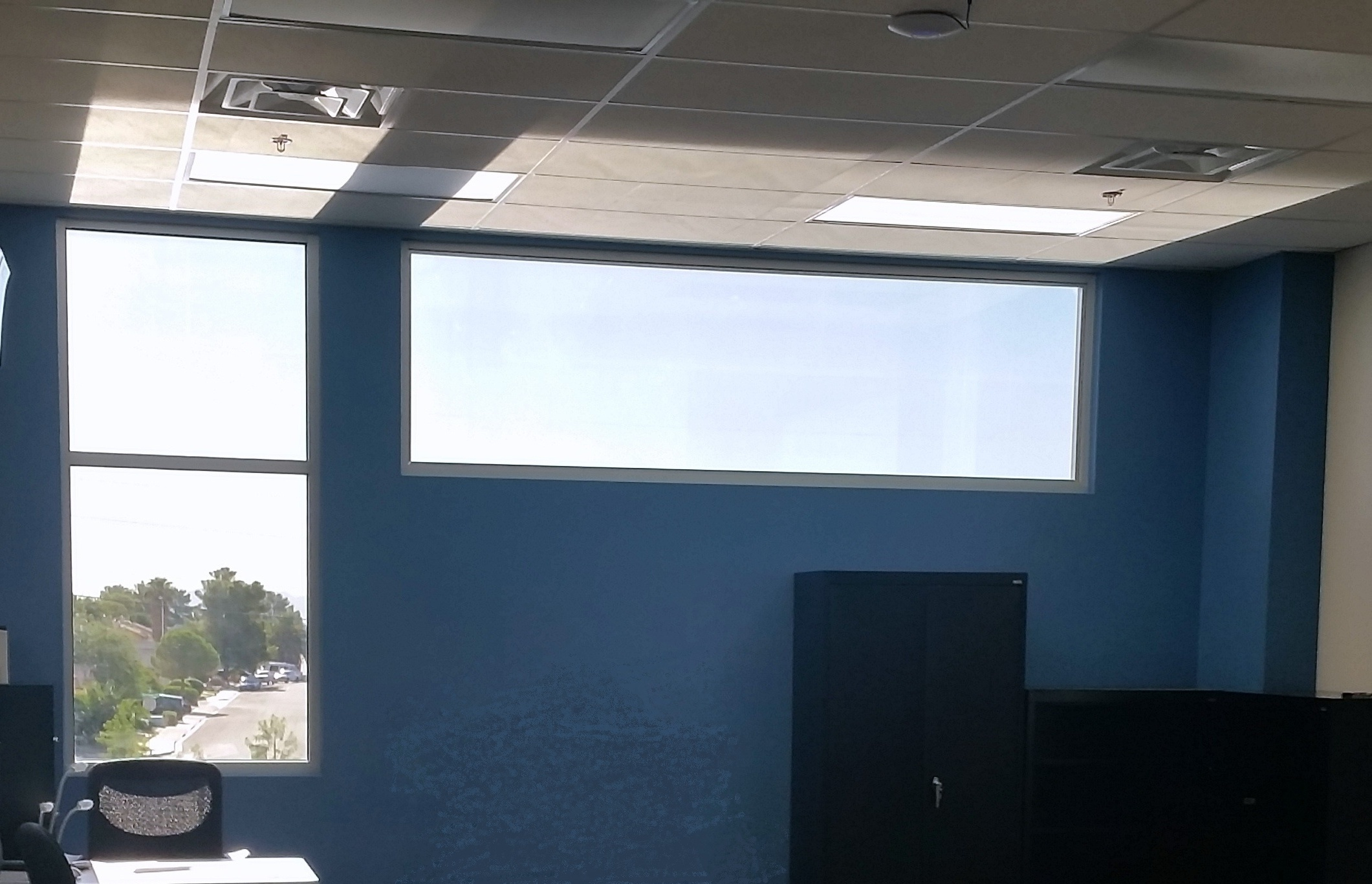
Daylight Redirecting Film (DRF), essentially a prism tile with very tiny prisms, sending light up onto the ceiling

== Mirror systems ==
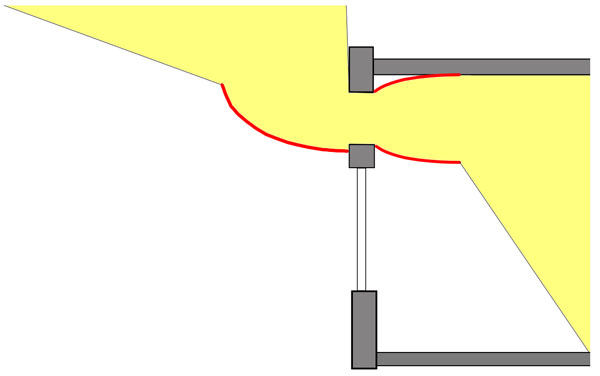
Basic zenithal daylighting arrangement. An external parabolic or elliptical mirror captures zenithal daylight, and converges it, to let it pass through a narrow opening in the exterior wall. On the inside, two parabolic mirrors widen the beam to around 60°. The floor area next to the conventional window is lit by the window.

Anidolic mirror lighting systems can be divided into three parts:

- daylight capture, usually with zenithal light collector
- optimal transmission of the light (via anidolic ceilings, light tubes, etc.)
- distribution of captured light to target areas inside the rooms

Architectural design also require optimal integration into the building facade.

=== Collection ===
Typically, light is captured with a compound parabolic collector (CPC) or elliptical collector (CEC) mounted on the exterior wall. These mirrors provide a wide and even collection pattern. The vertical capture angle approaches 90 degrees, from the horizon to the vertical plane of the supporting wall. An even capture pattern alleviates the need for a solar tracker: a permanently fixed anidolic collector remains effective at any time of day.

External parabolic collectors require proper heat insulation (usually double-glazed windows over the zenithal opening) and roller blinds to reduce excessive lighting, glare and heat on sunny days.

Snow and weatherproofing are also a consideration.

=== Transmission ===
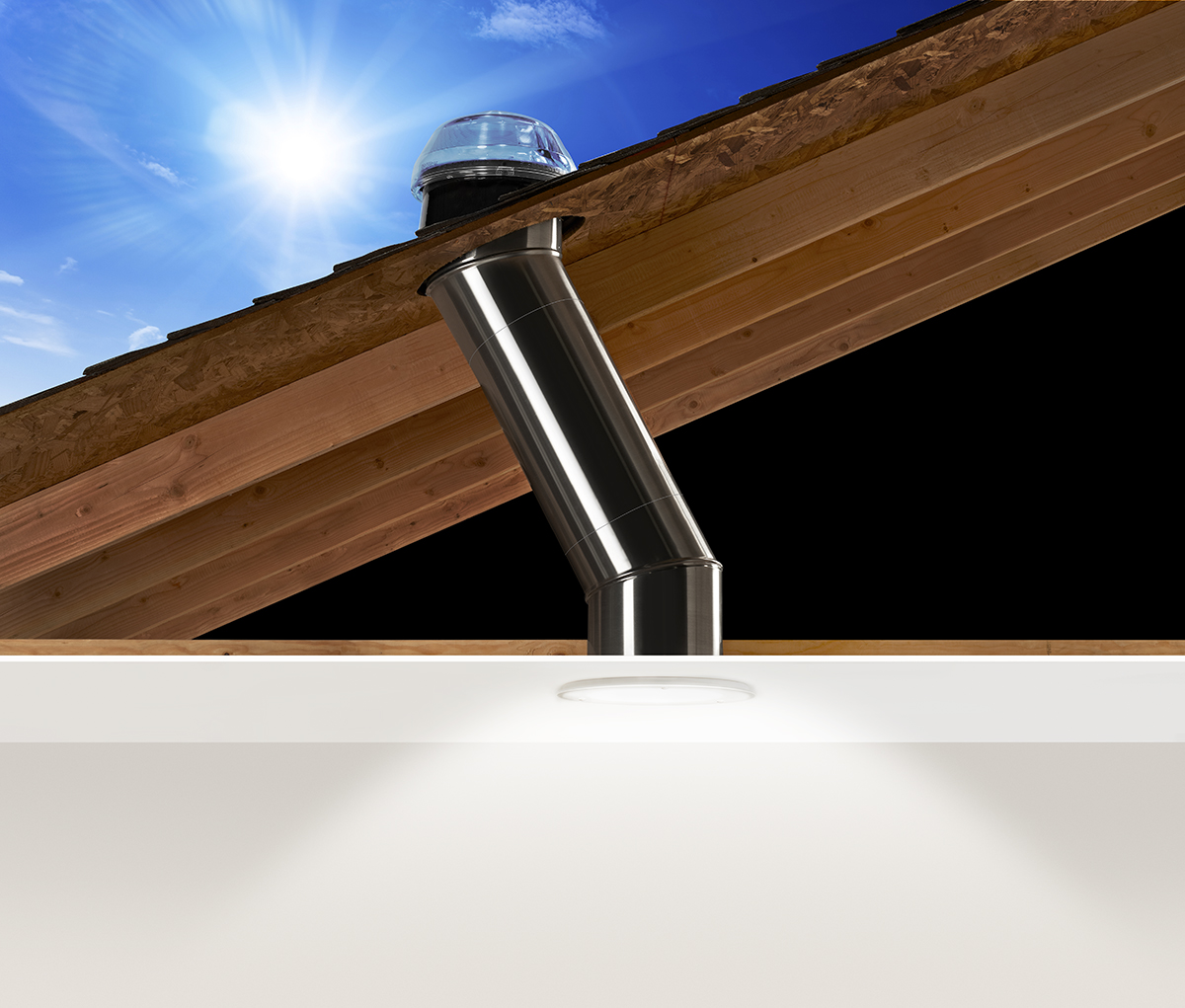
A simple light tube, showing collection, transmission, and distribution

Unlike the industrial parabolic troughs used in solar concentrators, architectural CPC mirrors do not concentrate captured light into a single focal point or focal line (which creates a fire hazard). Instead, light is directed into the building through a relatively wide opening.

=== Distribution ===
A second CPC or CEC mirror acting as an angle transformer disperses this beam into a wide-angle, diffused pattern. If it transmits light from a wide external CPC, a light tube actually becomes a flat anidolic ceiling.

=== Architectural integration ===
Integrated anidolic systems reduce external protrusion and attempt to visually blend into traditional facades. However, like other anidolic systems, they are susceptible to glare and offer no protection from overheating on sunny days.

=== Example ===
For example, the external CPC in the reference lights a 6-metre-deep (20 ft) room. It protrudes 0.67 metres from the exterior wall and employs a 3.6-metre-long (12 ft), 0.5-meter-tall (1.6 ft) light tube, followed by a 0.9-metre-long (3.0 ft) interior CPC, to deliver captured light into the back of the room. This arrangement provided 32% energy savings over a six-month period compared to a reference facade.

== See also ==
- Architectural light shelf
- Daylighting
- Deck prism
- Light tube
- Passive solar building design
- Pavement lights
- Sunroom

== General and cited references ==
- Chaves, Julio (2015). Introduction to Nonimaging Optics (Second ed.). CRC Press. ISBN 978-1482206739.
- J.-L. Scartezzini (2003). "Advances in daylighting and artificial lighting". Research in Building Physics: Proceedings of the 2nd International Conference on Building Physics, 14–18 September 2003, Antwerpen, Belgium. Taylor & Francis. ISBN 978-90-5809-565-7.
