= Seattle Underground =

Network of underground basements and walkways in Seattle, Washington

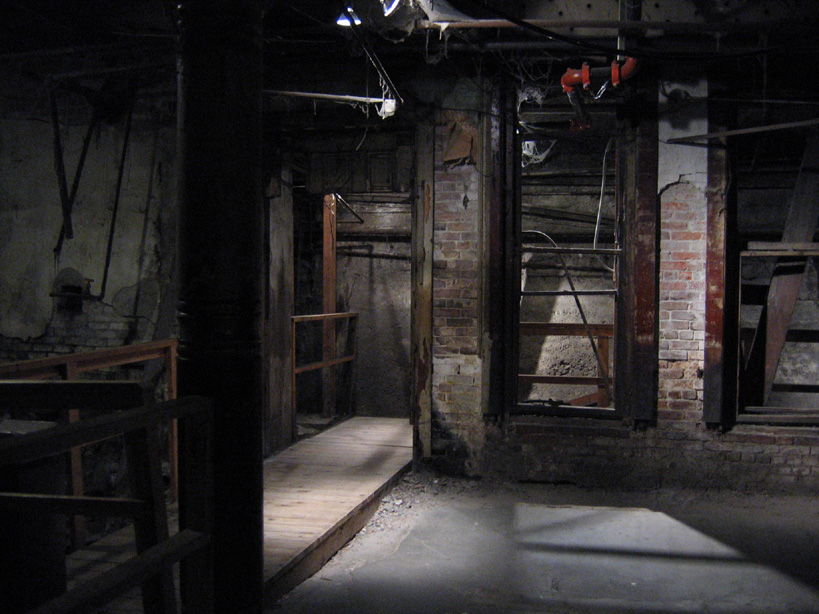
The Seattle Underground. The facade seen here was at street level in the mid-1800s.

The Seattle Underground is the collective name for a series of areaways, former sidewalks, building basements, and other spaces beneath the present-day buildings and sidewalks of Seattle's Pioneer Square neighborhood. Many were created during the reconstruction and raising of street grades that followed the Great Seattle Fire of 1889.

== History ==
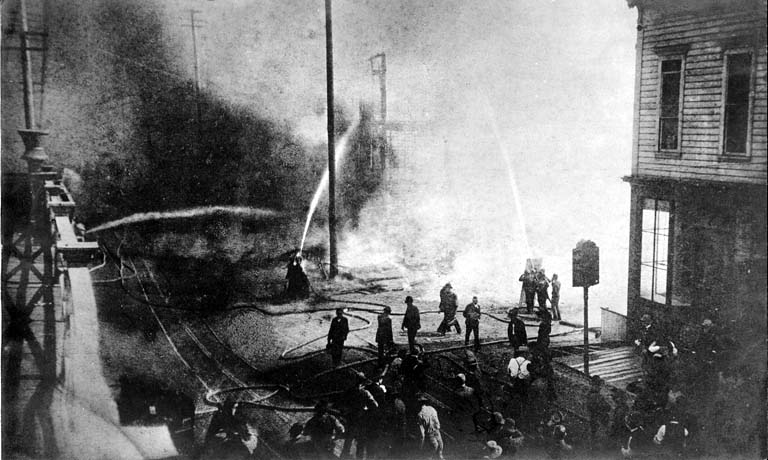
Start of the Great Seattle Fire, looking south on 1st Avenue near Madison Street

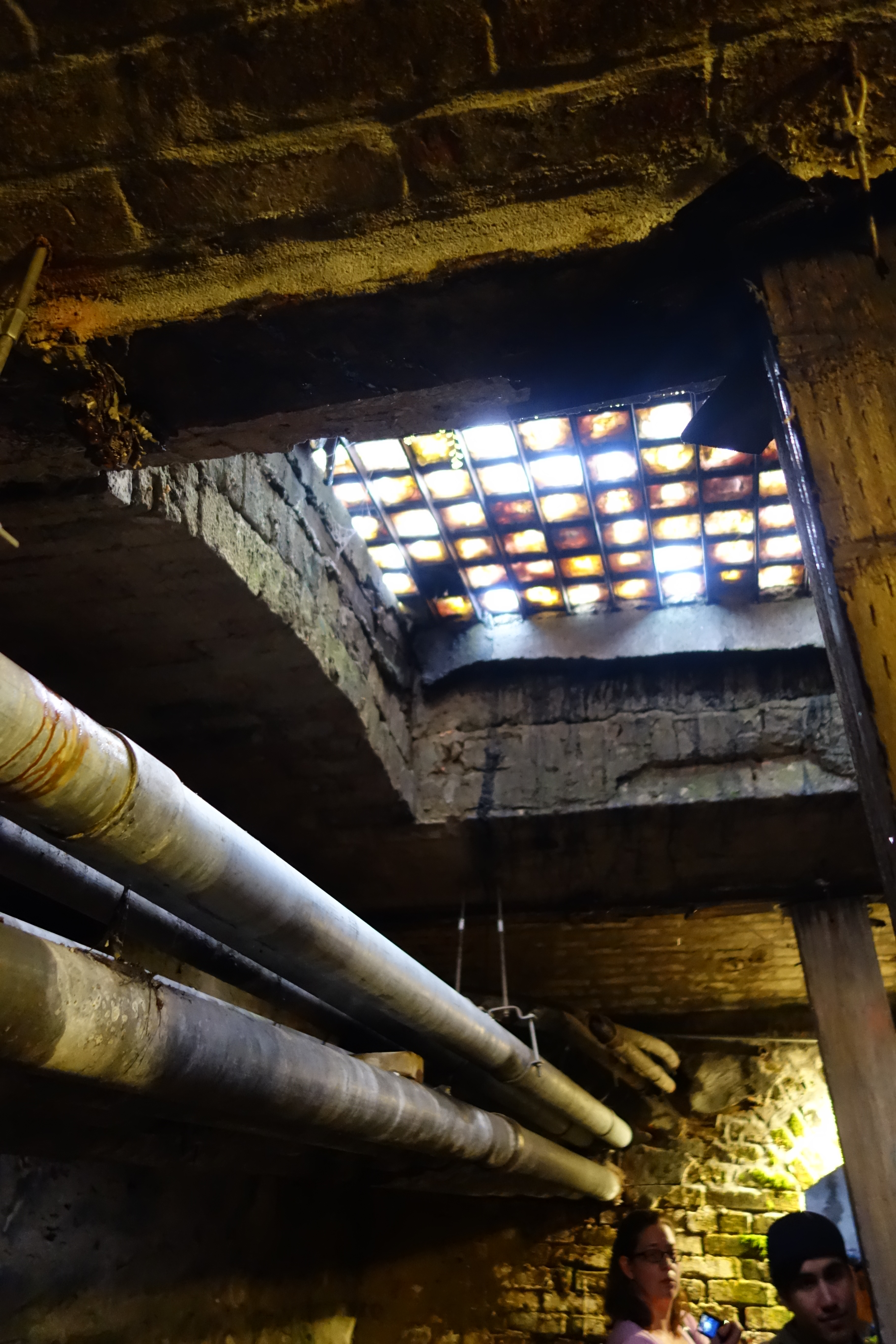
A view looking upwards at the vault lights (glass skywalks). The roof of a building at previous street level; now the top of the glass is walked upon and forms the current sidewalk.

At approximately 2:20 p.m. on June 6, 1889, the Great Seattle Fire destroyed much of Seattle's central business district and waterfront. The fire began in a cabinet shop near Front Street (present-day First Avenue) and Madison Street. It spread rapidly through the commercial district which was constructed predominately out of wood. Following the fire, Seattle adopted new building requirements intended to reduce the risk of another major conflagration, including the use of masonry construction in the commercial district.

Reconstruction also provided an opportunity to address longstanding problems with the area's topography and infrastructure. Much of early Seattle's commercial district had been constructed on low-lying ground near Elliott Bay, including tidal flats. In addition, the city faced persistent problems with drainage and steep street grades. During reconstruction and subsequent improvements, streets in what is now Pioneer Square were raised above their earlier elevations. In different locations, the change in grade varied from several feet to one story.

The raising of the streets did not simply bury the existing neighborhood. Retaining walls were constructed along the new roadway grades and the areas between them were filled, while spaces between the retaining walls and adjacent buildings remained open beneath the sidewalks. These spaces, known as areaways, had previously been at or near street level. As street and sidewalk elevations changed, the original ground floors of some buildings effectively became basement levels.

At first, pedestrians climbed ladders to go between street level and the sidewalks in front of the building entrances. Brick archways were constructed next to the road surface, above the submerged sidewalks. Vault lights (a form of walk-on skylight with small panes of clear glass which later became amethyst-colored) were installed over the gap from the raised street and the building, creating the area now called the Seattle Underground.

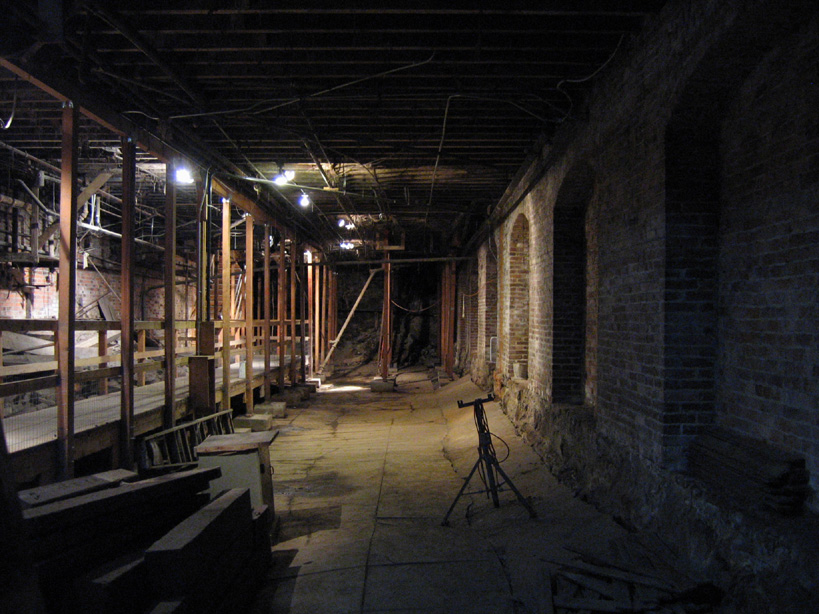
The concrete floor of the former meat market was originally at the level of the wooden platform on the left but sank over time because of decomposing sawdust fill.

When they reconstructed their buildings, merchants and landlords knew that the ground floor would eventually be underground and the next floor up would be the new ground floor, so there is very little decoration on the doors and windows of the original ground floor, but extensive decoration on the new ground floor.

Once the new sidewalks were complete, building owners moved their businesses to the new ground floor, although merchants carried on business in the lowest floors of buildings that survived the fire, and pedestrians continued to use the underground sidewalks lit by the vault lights (still seen on some streets) embedded in the grade-level vaulted sidewalk above.

In 1907, the city condemned the Underground for fear of bubonic plague, two years before the 1909 World Fair in Seattle (Alaska-Yukon-Pacific Exposition). The basements were left to deteriorate or were used as storage. Some became illegal flophouses for the homeless, gambling halls, speakeasies, and opium dens.

== Tours ==
Abandoned Underground Bathroom in Seattle

Only a small portion of the Seattle Underground has been restored and made safe and accessible to the public on guided tours.

In 1965, local citizen Bill Speidel formally created "Bill Speidel's Underground Tour", which continues to operate from the Pioneer Building and adjacent buildings. The tour route passes disused storefronts, artifacts, and multiple tunnel entrances.

A second tour company, Beneath the Streets, was created in 2013 and explores different sections of Seattle's Underground network. In addition to its standard tour, Beneath The Streets offers specialized experiences, including a Queer History Tour, highlighting the LGBTQ+ community's impact on the city's development, and an After Hours Tour, which delves into the district's vibrant and complex past.

== See also ==
- Catacombs of Paris
- Catacombs of Rome
- Edinburgh Vaults
- Mary King's Close
- Manchester Cathedral Steps
- Raising of Chicago
- Shanghai tunnels (less commonly known as the Portland Underground, in Portland, Oregon)
- Underground Atlanta
- Underground City, Montreal, modern construction of interconnected office buildings, hotels, shopping centers and other venues in Montreal's CBD
- Underground City (underground features in cities around the world)
