= Prism lighting =

Use of prisms to improve lighting

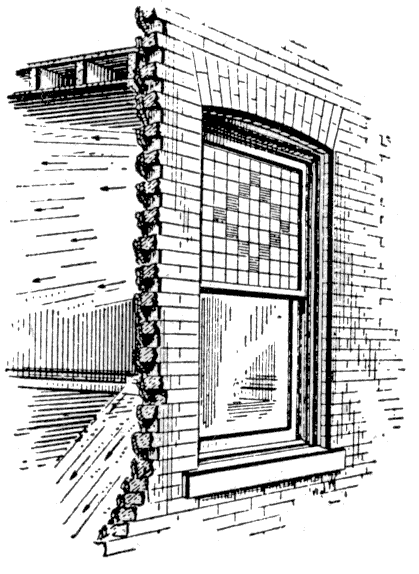
A prism transom bends light passing through the upper part of the window upwards.

Prism lighting is the use of prisms to improve the distribution of light in a space. It is usually used to distribute daylight, and is a form of anidolic lighting.

Prism lighting was popular from its introduction in the 1890s through to the 1930s, when cheap electric lights became commonplace and prism lighting became unfashionable. While mass production of prism lighting systems ended around 1940, the 2010s have seen a revival using new materials.

== How it works ==
The human eye's response to light is non-linear: halving the light level does not halve the perceived brightness of a space, it makes it look only slightly dimmer. If light is redistributed from the brightest parts of a room to the dimmest, the room therefore appears brighter overall, and more space can be given a useful and comfortable level of illumination (see before and after images from an 1899 article, below). This can reduce the need for artificial lighting.

Refraction and total internal reflection inside optical prisms can bend beams of light. This bending of the light allows it to be redistributed.

Many small prisms may be joined at the edges into a sheet. A prism sheet is somewhat like a linear Fresnel lens, but each ridge may be identical. Unlike a Fresnel lens, the light is not intended to be focused, but used for anidolic lighting.

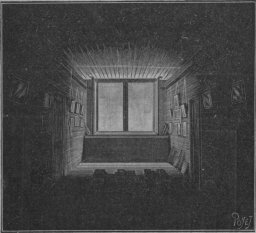
Uneven light from a window.

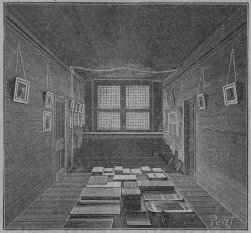
The same light, redistributed by prism tiles in the window.

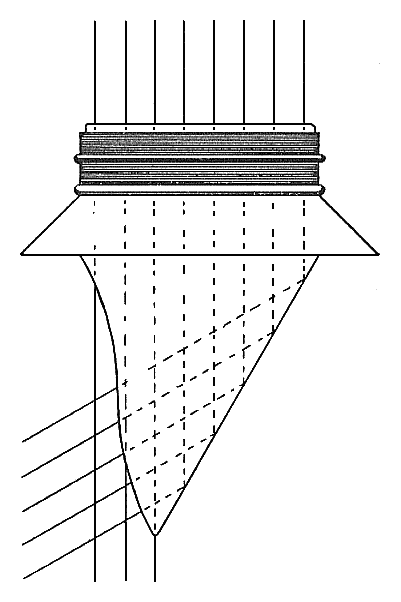
Single pendant prism from a vault light, showing total internal reflection

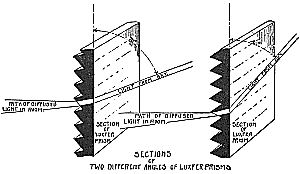
Two different prescriptions of prism tiles, showing their differing refraction of the light. The angle of the incoming light differs, but the outgoing angle of the outgoing light is the same (optimally, nearly horizontal).

== Types ==
Deck prisms carried light through the upper decks of ships and spread it in the decks below. Similarly, on land, prisms in sidewalk lights were used to light basements and vaults.

Prism tiles were used vertically, usually as a transom light above a window or door. They were also built into fixed and movable canopies, sloped glazing, and skylights. They bend light upwards, so that it penetrates more deeply into the room, rather than lighting the floor near the window.

Modern prismatic panels are essentially an acrylic version of the old glass prism tiles. Like glass tiles, they can be mounted on adjustable canopies. Channel panels use slits that reflect light internally. Holographic optical elements can also be used to redirect light.

Daylight redirecting window film (DRF) is a thin, flexible peel-and-stick sheet, with the optical layer generally made of acrylic. There are two types of film. Some film is moulded with tiny prisms, making a flexible peel-and-stick miniature prismatic panel. Other film is moulded with thin near-horizontal voids protruding into or through the acrylic; the slits reflect light hitting their top surfaces upwards. Refraction is minimized, to avoid colouring the light. The reflection-based films are more transparent (both are translucent), but they tend to send the light up at the ceiling, not deeper into the room. Refraction-based films are translucent rather than transparent, but offer finer control over the direction of the outgoing light beam; the film can be made in a variety of prism shapes to refract light by a variety of angles.

== Manufacture and repair ==
Older glass elements were cast, and might be cut and polished. Prism tiles were often made of single prisms joined with zinc, lead, or electroglazed copper strips (rather like the methods used to join traditional European stained glass). Sidewalk prisms were cast in one piece as single or multiple-prism lenses, and inserted into load-bearing frames. Daylight redirecting film is made of acrylic.

Damaged prism tiles may be repaired, and as they came in standard designs, there is a salvage market in replacements. Replacements for one-piece castings can be commissioned. Weakened prism tiles may be reinforced with hidden bars, much like those used to reinforce stained glass.

== Architectural design ==
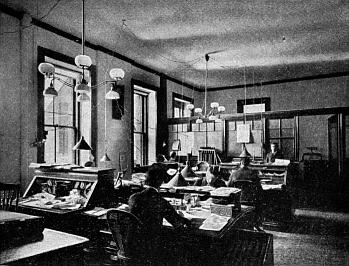
Optimal daylighting of a room using prism lighting. Prism tile canopies outside send light skimming across the ceiling, so that it penetrates deeply into the room.

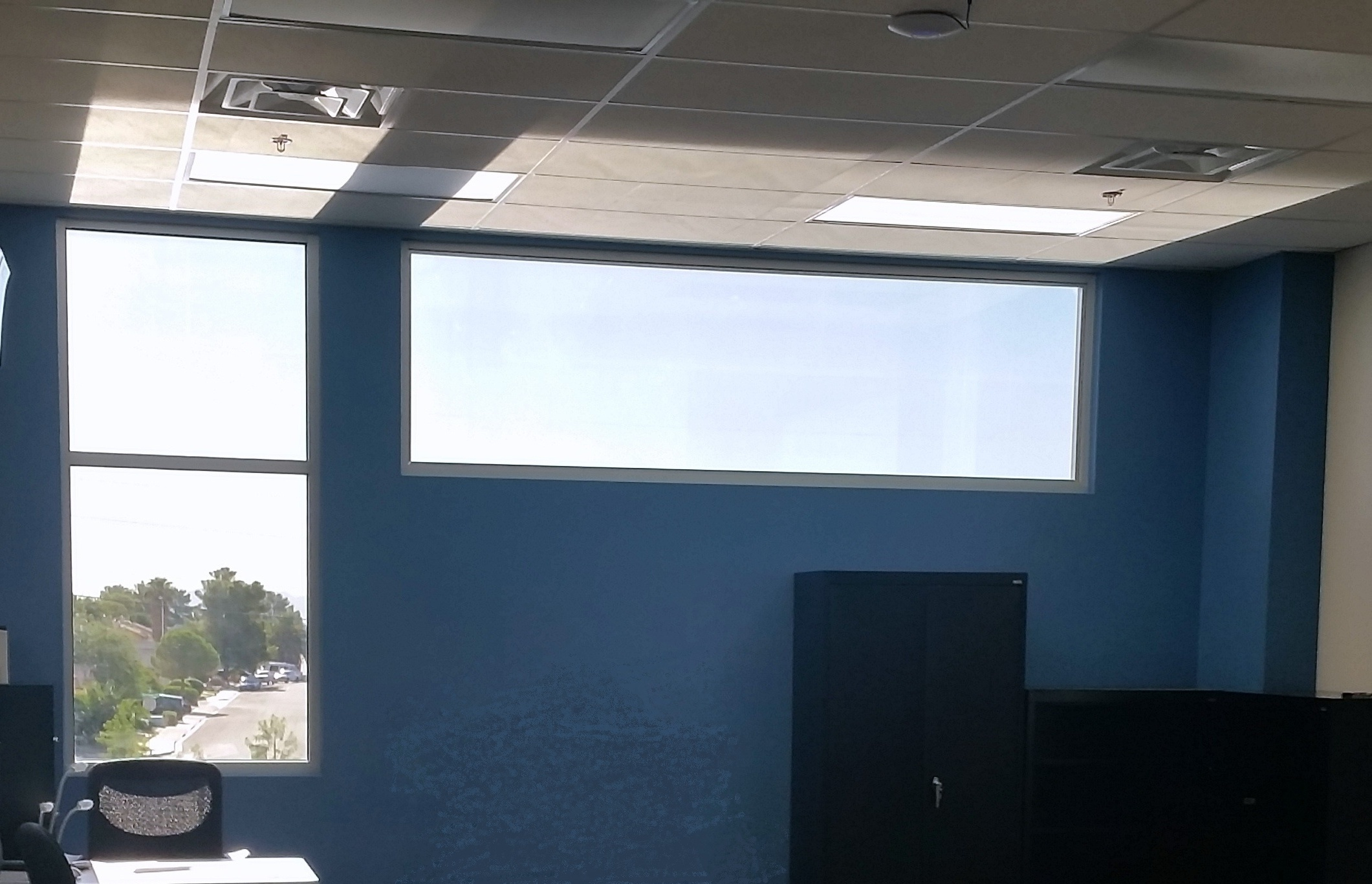
Suboptimal use of prism lighting. Daylight redirecting film stuck to the inside of the windows reflects light sharply up onto the ceiling, mostly lighting the area nearest the window.

Sophisticated systems for lighting different sorts of spaces with prism tiles were developed. Generally, the goal was to send the available light across the room nearly horizontally. One company sold tiles with nine prescriptions, giving different angles of refraction. Different prescriptions were often used in different parts of the same window transom, sometimes to disperse the light vertically, and sometimes to bend light horizontally around obstacles like pillars.

Prism tiles sometimes have elaborate artistic designs moulded into the outside; Frank Lloyd Wright created over forty prism tile designs.

Prism lighting works more effectively in light, open spaces. Some believe that it contributed to the trend away from dark, subdivided Victorian interiors to open-plan, light-coloured ones. The removal or covering of old prism transom lights often leaves characteristically tall signage spaces over shop windows (see pictures).

Daylight redirecting window film was initially made of one redirecting film and one glare-reducing diffusing film, often located on different interior surfaces of a double-glazed window, but integrated single films are now available. Some daylight redirecting films reflect incoming light upwards off tiny near-horizontal reflectors, so at high sun angles they bend it sharply, throwing it upwards to the ceiling, where a typical ceiling diffuses the daylight somewhat deeper into the space. Other daylight redirecting films refract light at any specified angle, ideally sending it nearly horizontally into the room. Redirecting films can be used as a substitute for opaque blinds.

== Gallery ==
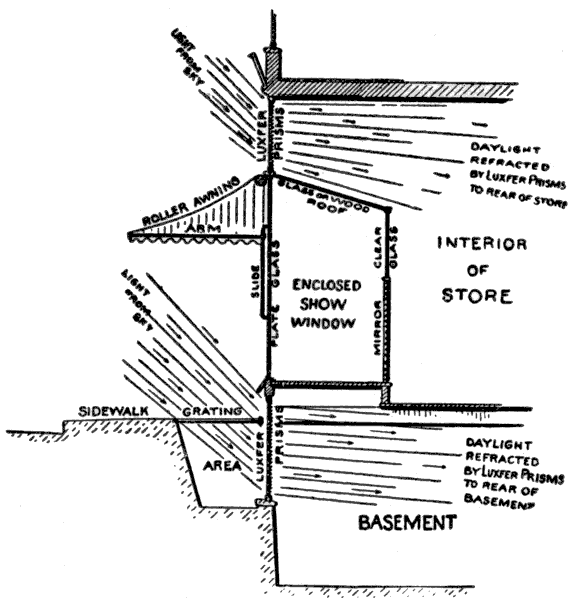
Daylighting a shop with a display window using prism tile transoms

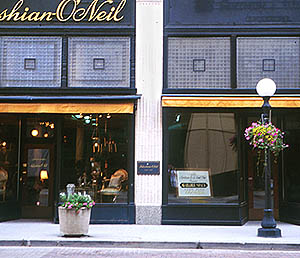
An outside view of such a store (broader view, closer view)

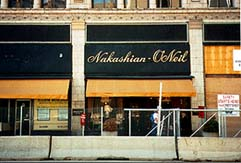
The same store before the prism lights were restored, showing characteristic proportioning

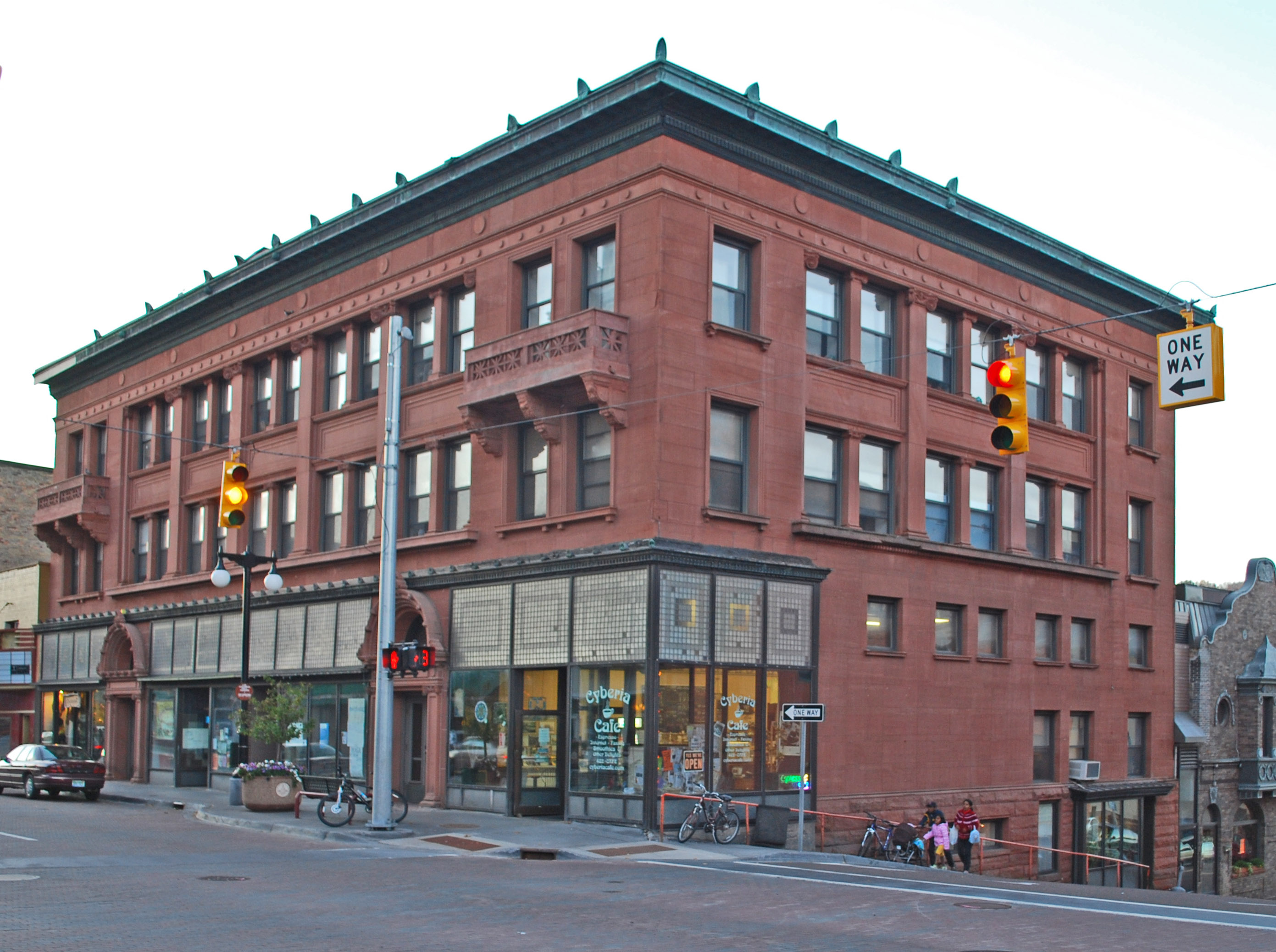
A building with original transom prisms for the shops

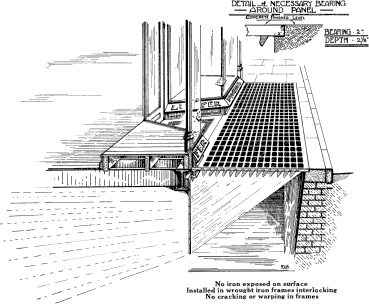
Two-stage refraction for basement lighting

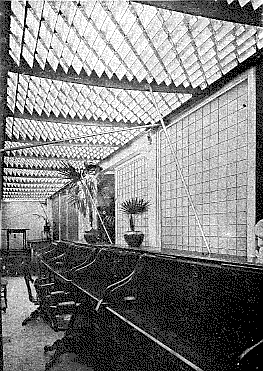
The system in use to light a salesroom inside a hollow sidewalk. The ceiling and the wall on the right are prisms.

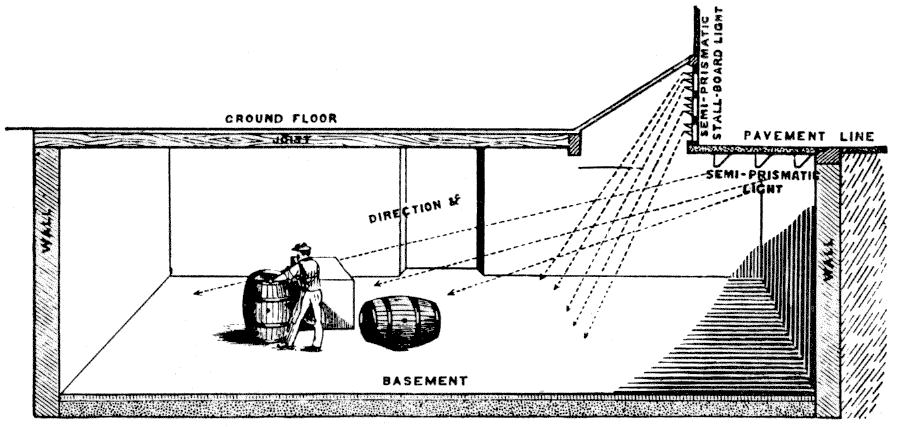
Diagram of a stall-board prism light. This system can also daylight a basement without a hollow sidewalk.

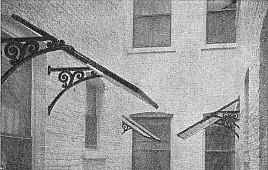
Prism glass canopies in a courtyard, to bend near-vertical light sideways into the windows

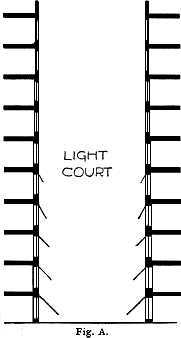
A scheme for a light well, with progressively larger prism canopies lower down

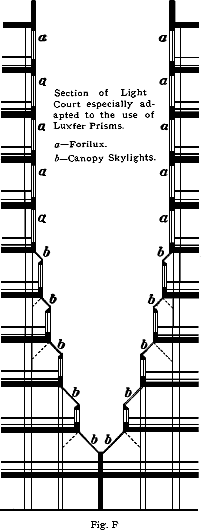
Tapered space-saving light well designed for use with prism lighting

== See also ==
- Anidolic lighting
- Daylighting
- Vault light
- Liter of Light
- Daylight redirecting film
- Glass brick
