= Aste =

Aste or ASTE may refer to:

- Aste (rapper) (born 1985), Finnish rapper
- Aste, Estonia, a borough in Kaarma Parish, Saare County, Estonia
- Aste, Estonia (village), A village in Kaarma Parish, Saare County, Estonia
- Aste, India, a village in Belgaum district, Karnataka, India
- Aircraft & Systems Testing Establishment, a unit of the Indian Air Force
- Atacama Submillimeter Telescope Experiment
- Succinylglutamate desuccinylase or AstE, an enzyme
- Association for Science Teacher Education, an affiliate of the National Science Teaching Association

== See also ==
- Aste-Béon, a commune in the Pyrénées-Atlantiques department of France
