= Artificial sky =

Daylight simulation device

The artificial sky is a daylight simulation device that replicates the light coming from the sky dome. An architectural scale model or 1:1 full-scaled aircraft is placed under an artificial sky to predict daylight penetration within buildings or aircraft that subjects to different situations, complex geometries, or heavily obstructed windows. The concept of the artificial sky was derived due to heliodon’s limitation in providing a stable lighting environment for evaluating the diffuse skylight component.

== Description ==
An artificial sky is primarily utilized in the field of architecture to analyze daylight in buildings and spaces. Architectural students, architects, researchers, lighting designers, lighting engineers, automotive and aerospace engineering use the simulation device for various purposes. Several versions of the instrument are used in laboratories of architectural schools and practice for daylighting studies and research. Lighting engineers and designers use the artificial sky to measure illumination levels. The instrument is utilized to examine the visibility of tools in the cockpit in automotive and aerospace engineering to improve flight safety.

Since 1914, Artificial skies were used by architects and lighting engineers to find ways to stimulate the sky from which physical models of buildings could be measured for interior daylighting.

Generally, interior daylighting of buildings is analyzed at the design stage using physical models by observation and evaluation of physical models of light levels under a real sky, but the luminance is constantly varying, and regular results are difficult to obtain, therefore artificial sky forms the ideal way to predict daylight penetration.

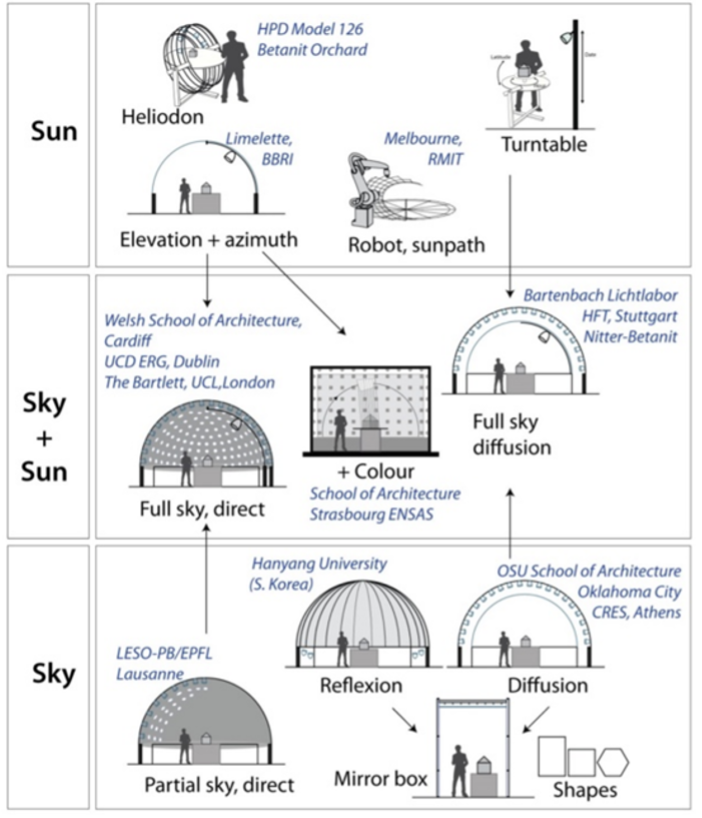
All daylight simulators, based on the lighting emission they produce

The artificial sky can replicate standard and statistical skies and are not restricted by the weather conditions of the natural sky. In general, the artificial sky is operational with lux meter heads, data logging systems, micro photo cameras and can be a manual or computerized system. The sky vault is partly or completely replicated. Three ways of replicating sky light are by direct lighting, by reflection, or by diffusion. Through reflection, spotlights directed under the model illuminate a white dome, the reflections on the dome illuminate the model. If the real sky emits a diffuse light, the most realistic principle is sky functioning by diffusion. Normally, the artificial sky has spherical forms. The most practical systems integrate the artificial sky with a mechanical Sun for reproducing the sunlight.

By measuring and estimating daylight penetration using artificial skies, building designers and engineers can reduce energy by controlling lighting, the simulation can provide a daylight design that reduces the environmental impact of buildings by decreasing the need for lighting, heating, and cooling. By analyzing issues of architectural light simulation, the simulation models which use artificial skies gives valuable advice to attain the best design solution for buildings and spaces. Daylight studies help in the design of passive houses, zero-energy buildings, and ecological building design.

To address readability issues that arise due to glare and faded screens under ambient lighting conditions in automotive displays, artificial skies provide a luminous environment that allows designers and engineers to handle any areas of concern.

The use of simulation aids in avoiding glare and reflected heat from building's facades mainly due to innovative design forms. Since the intense sun rays affect the surrounding urban environment, the heat and glare affect people on nearby streets and buildings. The simulation device will allow designers to avoid unexpected events that occurred in concave surfaces of the Walkie Talkie skyscraper and Walt Disney Concert Hall where it caused damages due to reflected heat and glare. To avoid overheating in outdoor areas and buildings from reflected sun rays, simulation using artificial sky for such types of building forms during design stages allows architects to avoid the high cost of retrofitting and damages.

Artificial sky types include mirror boxes, full-dome sky, virtual dome, and reflectors.

== Types of artificial sky ==
=== Mirror box ===
A mirror box is an artificial sky consisting of a luminous ceiling and mirrored walls, used to replicate uniform or overcast skies. In a mirror box, a consistent luminance distribution is created from reflections of the light from the mirrored walls and an appropriate estimation of CIE standard overcast sky is simulated. The light source is the white diffusing material illuminated by several lamps from behind to diffuse the light throughout the room with help of sensors. The walls of the room are surrounded by plane mirrors organized vertically on all sides, which produces an image of the luminous ceiling by reflection and inter-reflection.

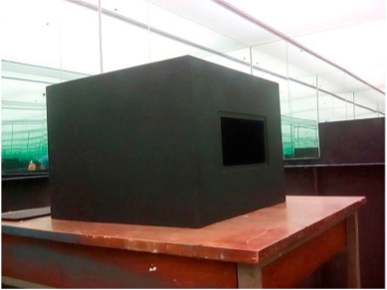
A scale model inside mirror box artificial sky

A typical mirror box is a rectangular or octagonal box that can be installed in any laboratory. The mirror box is a simple, compact, and inexpensive artificial sky. But it can only replicate the standard overcast sky; therefore, it is suitable for Daylight Factor (DF) analysis.

Mirror box artificial type is used in universities such as:

- At CEPT University, a mirror box artificial sky is installed at their laboratories of Center for Advanced Research in Buildings and Energy (CARBSE) for daylight analysis. In the university's living laboratory for Net Zero Energy Building (NZEB), the test chamber includes a mirror box artificial sky for both scholarly research and industry testing.
- At the University of Westminster (custom-made artificial sky), the fabrication lab designed a custom-made mirror box artificial sky. Within an interior dimension of 2.5mx2.5m, the tool can contain large scale architectural models to measure Daylight Factor.

=== Reflectors ===
The reflecting dome sky simulator is formed with a reflective opaque dome surface to reproduce uniform and non-uniform skies. The lighting system on the interior of the dome is formed to stimulate sky distributions that are different from a standard overcast sky. The artificial dome uses a reflective surface to illuminate sky distributions and evaluate daylighting on scale models placed on a rotatable tabletop. Also, it can be integrated with the artificial Sun to replicate sunlight. Compared to mirror boxes, reflecting dome skies are more adjustable in utilization and their variants are widely available in the market.

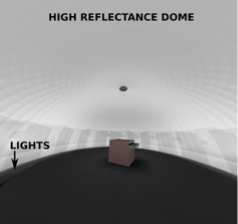
Illustration of Reflectors Artificial Sky

Reflecting artificial sky is available in university and research laboratories such as:

- Slovak Academy of Sciences, Bratislava, Slovakia, the facility built a flexible reflecting dome in the Institute of Construction and Architecture 1973. The 8m diameter hemispherical artificial sky is fully adjustable to uniform and non-uniform overcast skies with an artificial Sun, a parabolic mirror of diameter 1.2m. The artificial sky is a tubular construction that consists of gypsum plaster on metal mesh and designed on a circular ‘horizon’ tube suspended from the ceiling of the laboratory like a large white chandelier. Lawrence Berkeley Laboratory, California, USA, built the 7.32m diameter reflecting dome in 1981 which was designed to replicate a uniform sky, an overcast sky and various clear-sky luminance distributions. The sun simulator of diameter 1.5 m is used. The metal dome was kept at a height of a seven-foot-high cylindrical plywood wall which enables large models to be transferred in and out through the large doors. The reflectivity of up to 80% is achievable due to high-reflectance white paint sprayed on the interiors. The illumination system of high-output fluorescent lamps and ballasts provides an illumination level of around 5000 lx for a uniform sky, 3500 lx for the overcast sky and more than 6000 lx for a regular clear sky. Large architectural scale models of up to 6 feet across can be accommodated with the ability of the whole platform to rotate.
- Central Research Institute of Industrial Buildings, Perovo, Moscow, Russia evaluates research projects under the artificial sky and illuminating engineering facilities of the new laboratory for the Central Research Institute of Building Physics, Moscow. A 9m diameter skydome with 16 lamps of uniform luminance is accompanied by a Sun simulator of 0.9m diameter with a parabolic mirror outside the sky.
- The University of Michigan, Ann Arbor, MI, USA, the university uses a 9.2m diameter artificial sky, for measuring and evaluating overcast, uniform, and clear sky conditions with a Sun simulator of diameter 1.5m parabolic disc.

=== Virtual dome ===
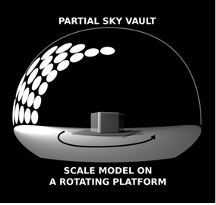
Illustration of Virtual Dome Artificial Sky

Virtual dome replicates the sky vault with a scanning process for any time and any location on Earth. This type of artificial sky is flexible due to its ability to replicate any type of sky. To limit cost and space, the virtual dome utilizes heavy robotic and fine control systems. The results of the simulation are measured only through a computer screen after a process of combinations of multiple simulations. It provides daylighting simulations on scale models on a rotating platform using an artificial sky and a Sun simulator. The artificial dome was found in the early nineties, and therefore it is the latest type of artificial sky.

Although it is the most precise tool, direct perceptions of the simulations are not achievable. Since direct perception is not possible in the virtual dome, the tool is largely used by scientists and not made for designers.

Virtual dome artificial sky is available in university and research laboratories such as:

- EPFL Solar Energy and Building Physics Laboratory LESO-PB, Vaud (laboratory-made artificial sky), The research laboratory developed a scanning sky simulator as a basis for other sky simulators which enables precise replication of the luminance distribution of all types of the sky. The tool uses a scanning process to rebuild the entire sky hemisphere, beginning with a sixth of the hemisphere. The overall hemisphere, established on Tregenza's model of 145 light zones, is reconstructed by a six-step scan. Quantitative data of illuminance and qualitative data of video digitized images are supplemented to the end of the procedure. It's an accurate tool to obtain diffuse light measurements within physical scale models for any time and location for the evaluation of innovative architectural solutions and daylighting systems. The laboratory built the instrument to reduce energy savings and enhance user comfort through the efficient use of daylighting.
- Daylighting Laboratory of the Politecnico di Torino (IT), Turin (laboratory-made artificial sky), the laboratory built an artificial scanning sky with addition to the artificial sun. A sky scanning simulator is characterized on the subdivision models of the sky hemisphere. The dome is subdivided into 145 circular areas, each of which is recognized of uniform luminance. The areas are replicated using circular luminaires established on a hemispherical surface. The structure consists of 25 luminaires, conforming to one-sixth of the entire hemisphere of 7m diameter. Various sky conditions of overcast, clear and intermediate are replicated corresponding to both standard models and real luminance values. The sky scanning simulator and sun simulator enables daylighting simulations produced inside scale models utilized for research and design outcomes. Photometric data and digital images of the luminous space are the outcomes that are attained. The dome was built for architects, engineers, lighting designers and researchers.
- Berkeley Education Alliance for Research in Singapore (BEARS), Singapore (commercial artificial sky), the laboratory which focuses on sustainable and low-carbon solutions utilizes a commercially available virtual dome manufactured by Betanit.com. The device evaluates the visual and lighting performance of buildings replicated with building scale models in a limited laboratory space. The artificial sky can simulate any sky distributions with the Tregenza subdivision using 145 patches.
- CEPT University, Ahmedabad (commercial artificial sky), the university uses components of an available virtual dome known as Kiwi Artificial Sky manufactured by Betanit.com at its CARBSE research laboratory. The light source was developed by the CARBSE team. Placed on the platform of the turntable, the building scale models are evaluated for daylighting studies. To perform analysis, the turntable can rotate the model in about two different axes and provide measurement for daylighting studies used for academic and research purposes.

=== Full dome ===
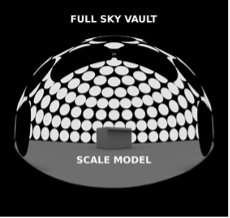
Illustration of Full Dome Artificial Sky

A full dome is a type of artificial sky that can replicate any kind of sky distribution using dimmable luminaires. The simulation and obtaining daylighting metrics are performed through computers. When integrated with a heliodon, the device can replicate direct sunlight at any global location. The full dome is the most advanced type of artificial sky available. They are the fastest, most powerful, and highly expensive simulators. It is used by students and researchers for optimizing daylighting studies in architectural spaces.

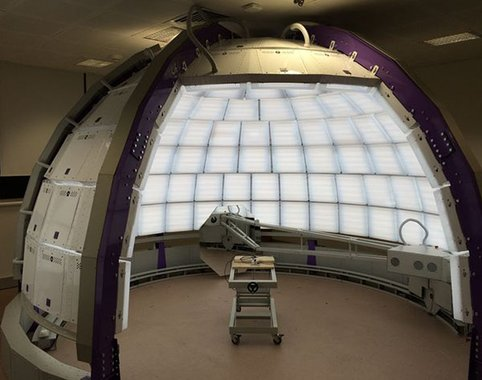
Full Dome Artificial Sky at UAEU University

Full dome artificial sky is available in the university, research laboratories and large lighting companies such as:

- Cardiff University, Wales (custom-made artificial sky) - the Welsh school of architecture uses an 8m diameter artificial sky with 640 fluorescent lamps. The lamps are controlled in sections that replicate sky distributions for daylight and Sun-path studies on building scale models on a rotating table.
- Bartenbach, Tyrol (custom-made artificial sky) - the lighting firm uses a 6.5m diameter artificial sky with 393 lamps for daylighting design with visualization models and calculations.
- UAE University, Al Ain (commercial artificial sky) - the university installed full dome artificial sky integrated with robotic heliodon in their Daylighting Simulation Laboratory, designed and manufactured by betanit.com. The hemi-dome of 4.5m diameter replicates a wide variety of sky conditions using computer control. The illuminance level of the overcast sky is 20000 lx and exceeds 60000 lx for a clear sky. The accuracy and flexibility of the artificial sky are due to thermally monitored light patches that are computer-controlled to facilitate the reproduction of any sky for any location at any time of the day with a steady and stable gradation of luminous distribution. The artificial sky is used for teaching purposes in courses such as illumination & daylighting design and other areas of research in sustainable building design and technology at the university.
- The Bartlett, University College London (UCL), London (custom-made artificial sky) - the Bartlett Faculty of the Built Environment architecture students utilize a 5.2m diameter geodesic hemispherical dome to simulate several sky conditions on concept scale models. The device was custom-made by Peter Raynham of UCL and research assistant. The 810 individually controlled LED modules and 850mm-wide parabolic reflector in an arched interior can replicate the Sun's trajectory. The system provides an interactive studying than 3D models in CAD.
- University of Malta, Malta (commercial artificial sky), the university uses the artificial sky with a heliodon manufactured by betanit.com for daylighting studies, mainly for teaching, research, and design purposes.
- Universiti Teknologi MARA (UiTM), Kuala Lumpur (commercial-made artificial sky), the university incorporated Durian Artificial Sky manufactured from betanit.com, a full dome type of artificial sky for their daylighting laboratory in Kuala Lumpur. The Durian Artificial Sky dome was utilized for design parameters of temperature, light intensity, building orientation and position, and illuminated areas for a tropical climate building in the Malaysian context. It offers a common modelling of site context through an urban simulation and determines data of sky intensity of various locations of the site. The simulation helps the configuration of the design module to disperse out conferring to the light intensity of the site. Moreover, the simulation helps in achieving the energy efficiency of buildings located in a tropical climate.
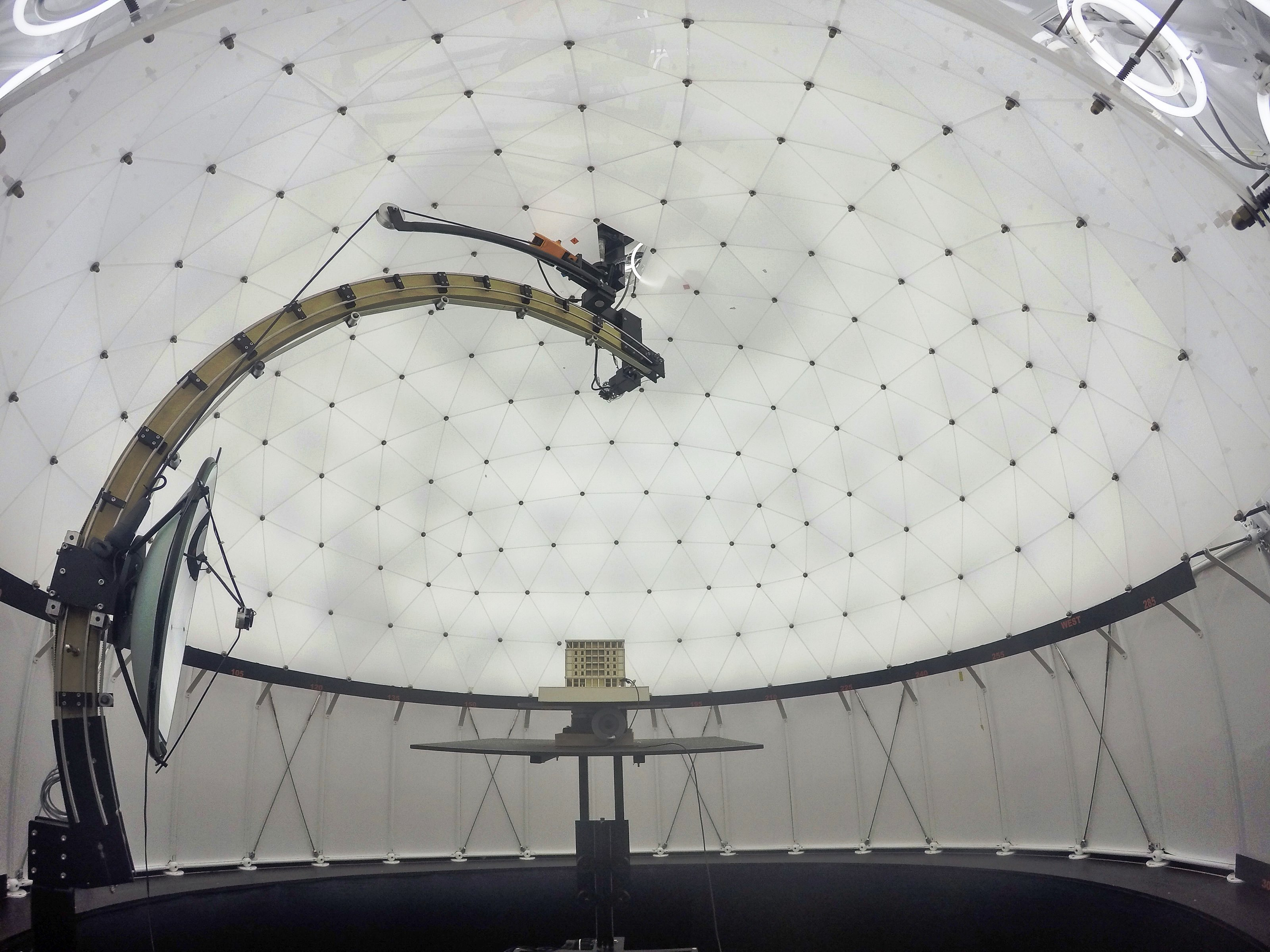
  Artificial Sky Lab - Stuttgart Technology University of Applied Sciences (Hft Stuttgart)
- NIISF – Research Institute of Building Physics, Moscow, Silver Pines, Russia, uses a hemispherical sky simulator of diameter 16.8m with 2,000 light modules and five parabolic stable sun reflectors with fixed altitudes.
- HFT, Stuttgart University of Applied Sciences, Stuttgart, the Daylight Planning Lab uses a translucent hemisphere of 4.20m diameter with 30 fluorescent lamps and the artificial sun simulator of a halogen bulb with a parabolic reflector. The device can provide accurate replication of the sky's brightness and the circumsolar radiation. It can reproduce sky distributions of sunny, overcast, or cloudy sky distributions.
- Oklahoma State University (OSU) utilized a transilluminated artificial sky built-in 2007 which consists of a geodesic dome of translucent diffusing ‘Lexan’ plastics in flanged self-supporting panels.

== See also ==
- Daylight harvesting
