= SGDS =

SGDS may refer to:

- Association des Scouts et Guides du Senegal, one of Senegal's Scouting and Guiding organizations.
- Spontaneous Genome Degeneration Syndrome, a fictional and deadly man-made virus, in the Soldiers of Anarchy video game.
- Succinylglutamate desuccinylase, an enzyme that catalyzes a chemical reaction.

== See also ==
- SGD (disambiguation)
