= Loren W. Neubauer =

Civil engineer

Loren Wenzel Neubauer (1904–1991) was a civil engineer active in the field of farm structures and wood structures, and a pioneer in the field of solar energy.

== Biography ==
=== Education ===
Neubauer was born in 1904 in St. James, Minnesota to parents John Neubauer (b1880) and Inez Emma Rasey Neubauer (b1883). Neubauer lived in and attended primary, secondary schools in St. Paul, Minnesota, and attended the University of Minnesota, where he was awarded a BS in Civil Engineering with distinction in 1926, a MS in Hydraulic Engineering in 1932. He went on to teach engineering at UC Davis, and while there, completed his studies to receive a PhD in Civil Engineering from the University of Minnesota in 1948.

=== Early career ===
Neubauer worked briefly as an inspector in the U.S. Engineer's office in Milwaukee, Wisconsin. While a graduate student he taught mathematics and mechanics, served as a draftsman in geography, and instructor in agricultural engineering. In 1936 when he went to work as an engineer for the Works Progress Administration, he had to ask permission from the Regents even though he was an unpaid instructor at the time. When he returned to the university his salary increased. He had also worked as an assistant highway engineer for the Aitkin Company and a surveyor for the U.S. Engineer's office in St. Paul.

== Agricultural engineering ==
Much of Neubauer's research concerned the quality of life on the farm, a reflection of his experience on his grandfather's farm as a child.

At the University of Minnesota he prepared reports on farm home and shop design and other extension materials.

At the University of California he developed a series of plan sets for a range of farm building types and worked on the economics of labor. He also applied his understanding of buildings and microclimate to potato storage. His farm experience was collected and refined in a book with Harry Walker, Farm Building Design. This was well regarded and used as a textbook.

== Solar energy ==
Neubauer's interest in solar energy had begun as a child. Watching the sun and shadows moving on a sundial and observing the clever use of the sun in orientation and design of hog pens on his grandfather's farm to help keep pigs cool in summer and warm in winter made sense to him. He also saw how simple windows could be powerful solar collectors when they melted his favorite rubber boots.

Neubauer conducted solar research at UC Davis with colleagues Fredrick A. Brooks (engineer) and Richard D. Cramer (architect). Earlier, Brooks had pursued solar and microclimate research for years and had produced a landmark report on solar water heating in California in 1936. He was also interested in solar heating for homes. Brooks and Neubauer produced a series of studies on the use of the sun for heating and solar control and microclimate resources for cooling.

Sometime before 1953, Neubauer created a type of heliodon, which he called the "solaranger."

He published studies which applied passive solar design to farm houses and animal shelters.

Neubauer's expertise and enthusiasm helped stimulate and support a series of key studies in the 1970s including a local climate adapted building code in "A Strategy for Energy Conservation" (1974), plans for a daylit naturally heated, cooled and ventilated state office building that would have used only 12% of the energy of a conventional office building design (1976), "The Davis Energy Conservation Report" (1977), and a final paper on the potential to reduce energy use dramatically simply by placing windows wisely.

Neubauer's solar research and contributions also were applied to plant research. He helped develop, refine and improve a sun tracking greenhouse for experiments. This phytotron increased solar gain and improved solar control for experimental purposes.

== Structural engineering ==
Neubauer is perhaps best known for his work on strength formulas and methods of calculation. His contributions also included a range of other formulas and methods for calculation These included papers on the use of computers in column design, systematic analysis of column design and wood-frame construction issues and a confirmation of the value of the cubic Rankine-Gordon method for shorter columns.

His interests also included more sustainable building materials including adobe, rammed earth, and sawdust concrete.

== Publications ==
- Neubauer, L. W.; Starr, G.; Melzer, B. (1980). "Temperature control by passive solar house design in California". Transactions of the ASAE. 23 (2): 0449–0457. doi:10.13031/2013.34602.
- Neubauer, L. W. (1972). "Orientation and insulation: model versus prototype". Transactions of the ASAE. 15 (4): 707–709. doi:10.13031/2013.37991.
- Neubauer, L. W. (1972). "Optimum alleviation of solar stress on model buildings". Transactions of the ASAE. 15 (1): 129–132. doi:10.13031/2013.37847.
- Neubauer, L. W. (1972). "Shapes and orientation of houses for natural cooling". Transactions of the ASAE. 15 (1): 126–128. doi:10.13031/2013.37846.
- Neubauer, L. W.; Cramer, R. D. (1968). "Effect of shape of building on interior air temperature". Transactions of the ASAE. 11 (4): 537–539. doi:10.13031/2013.39460.
- Neubauer, L. W.; Cramer, R. D. (1966). "Solar radiation control for small exposed houses". Transactions of the ASAE. 9 (2): 0194–0195. doi:10.13031/2013.39919.
- Neubauer, L. W.; Cramer, R. D. (1965). "Diurnal radiant exchange with the sky dome". Solar Energy. 9 (2): 95–103. Bibcode:1965SoEn....9...95C. doi:10.1016/0038-092x(65)90209-4.
- Neubauer, L. W.; Cramer, R. D. (1965). "Shading devices to limit solar heat gain but increase cold sky radiation". Transactions of the ASAE. 8 (4): 470–472, 475. doi:10.13031/2013.40552.
- Neubauer, L. W.; Cramer, R. D.; Laraway, M. (1964). "Temperature control of solar radiation on roof surfaces". Transactions of the ASAE. 7 (4): 432–434, 438. doi:10.13031/2013.40799.
- Cramer, R. D.; Neubauer, L. W. (1959). "Summer heat control for small homes". Transactions of the ASAE. 2 (1): 0102–0103. doi:10.13031/2013.41180.
- Cramer, R. D.; Neubauer, L. W. (1958). "Solar radiant gains through directional glass exposure". Heating, Piping, Air Conditioning. 30 (11): 155–62.
- Neubauer, L. W. (July 1958). "Control of solar radiation". California Agriculture: 9, 14.
- Neubauer, L. W.; Deering, R. B.; Kay, V. G. (1958). "Temperature control for houses". Journal of Home Economics. 50 (3): 175–184.
- Everson, G. J.; Neubauer, L. W.; Deering, R. B. (1956). "Environmental influence on orientation and house design to improve living comfort". Journal of Home Economics. 48 (3): 161–167.

== Personal ==
Neubauer married Lorraine Prentice in 1926. They had one daughter.
