= Heliodon =

Architectural device used for angle calculations

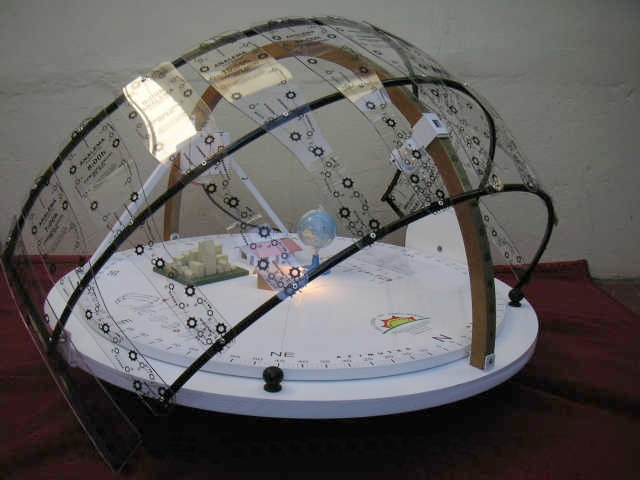
Heliodon of Analemas

A Heliodon Animation

A heliodon (HEE-leo-don) is a device for demonstrating the angle that the sun shines on an object at various times of the day, and for different seasons. It does so by adjusting the angle between a flat surface and a beam of light to match the angle between a horizontal plane at a specific latitude and the solar beam. Some heliodons work by holding the surface still while moving the light source, and others work using a stationary light and tilting the flat surface with the model attached to simulate the motion of the sun. A few heliodons are designed to be used outdoors, or near a window, using the sun it self as the light source while tilting the surface with the model attached.

Heliodons are used primarily by architects and students of architecture. By placing a model building on the heliodon’s flat surface and making adjustments to the light/surface angle, the investigator can see how the building would look in the three-dimensional solar beam at various dates and times of day.

== History ==
Shortly after World War II, in the 1950s, there was a wide interest in producing building design techniques that correspond to the climate. At Princeton Architectural Laboratory, Thermoheliodon was invented by Olgyays in hopes to create physiological conditions of human comfort through architectural design. Thermoheliodon was a domed insulated evaluation bed for scaled architectural models in certain climatic conditions measured to a high level of calculation and accuracy. The device was a covered simulating environment where a scaled model’s thermal performance could be evaluated under different temperatures. However, attaining precise evaluation was an issue with Thermoheliodion due to the impact of scale on thermal performance. Although Thermoheliodon failed to produce an accurately measured environment, the device led to further research on adaptive and efficient design orientation of buildings and developed the base of bioclimatic design principles.

During the 1950s, The Building Research Station (BRS), a key institution in the UK designed Heliodon as part of Tropical Architecture and Bio-climatic Architecture. The institution aimed to enhance housing conditions and development of local resources for construction in colonial territories. Heliodon was designed to replicate the sun on architectural scale models through a point of light. The device can shift and tilt to obtain the accurate position of the sun on any given day, time, or location.

In the 1960s, a heliodon was invented by Gershon Fruhling in Israel, recorded by the United States Patent Office. This heliodon consists of a platform created to hold a model of the building whose isolation is to be evaluated. The horizontal platform can sway on a rotatable vertical shaft which can turn on its axis. The rotation allows horal and seasonal adjustments and swings the unit almost to its base. The titling of the shaft enables the adjustment to various geographical locations on the latitude scale. Any external light source along with the sun can be utilised and the placement of this light source can be kept stationary throughout the observations. This heliodon is an accurate instrument that can make rapid and simple adjustments. And the requirement of providing a precisely located light source is not necessary.

In the 1990s, modern heliodons with quicker simulations and a greater level of accuracy were invented. EPFL Solar Energy and Building Physics Laboratory LESO-PB in Lausanne designed a robotic heliodon to simulate direct light. This heliodon is combined with a sky scanning simulator (artificial sky) to predict the light distribution in a building over the entire year. The device can reproduce direct light at any location on Earth.

After the 2000s, Prof. Norbert Lechner, an architect, LEED AP and an expert in energy responsive architecture has invented a manual Sun Emulator Heliodon. He invented heliodons which were much easier to evaluate daylight simulation than the previous models. The Sun Emulator Heliodon can precisely show all solar responsive design principles and strategies. Although the device can hold only small architectural scale models, it is a great instrument for teaching solar geometry. This heliodon was manufactured by High Precision Devices and now an alternative device is Orchard Heliodon produced by betanit.com, with the approval of the inventor of the Sun Emulator Heliodon.

Since 2004, the Italian company betanit.com is developing various heliodons designed by architect Giulio M. Podesta for use in daylighting laboratories of universities and architectural firms. The architect designed the Orchard Heliodon with similar features to the Sun Emulator heliodon (developed by Norbert Lechner). For more precise simulations, Orange Heliodon, an easy-to-use robotic heliodon with a fixed light source was designed and was launched in the market in 2007. Moreover, the Orange Heliodon was used at Politecnico di Milano in the architectural design laboratory of the BEST department. It used a computerized and automatic heliodon to reproduce the sunshade. Furthermore, the architect designed Tulip Heliodon, a robotic heliodon with a fixed light source that is often merged with full dome artificial sky for collaborative design and presentation used for daylight studies.

Kwok Pun Cheung, a professor and researcher at the Department of Architecture in Hong Kong University developed various heliodons. Cheung developed a simple tabletop heliodon and multi-lamp heliodon for use in architectural schools. Moreover, a tabletop heliodon with a moving light source was developed for architect offices. A patented portable direct sunlight light-duty universal heliodon set up on a camera tripod was developed for evaluating the impacts of direct sunlight on small architectural models or building components.

== Scientific background ==
The Earth is a ball in space perpetually intercepting a cylinder of parallel energy rays from the Sun. (Think of a tennis ball being held in the wind.) The angle of any site of Earth to the solar beam is determined by

- The site’s latitude, which gives its position on the curve of the Earth between the Equator and one of the Poles.
- The time of day at the site, measured by its progress eastward around the Earth’s axis from sunrise to sunset.
- The date, which locates the Earth on its annual orbit of the Sun.

The change due to date is the most difficult to visualize. The Earth’s axis is steady but tilted: the plane that includes the Earth’s equator, which is perpendicular to the axis, is not parallel to the plane that includes the center of the Sun and the center of the Earth, called the ecliptic. Think of the Earth as a car on a Ferris wheel. The car’s axis always points “down”, which changes its relation to the center of the wheel. A light at the center of the wheel would touch the bottom of the car at the top of the orbit and the top of the car at the bottom of the orbit. As the Earth orbits, the location of the centerline of the solar cylinder changes, sliding from the Tropic of Cancer (in June) to the Tropic of Capricorn (in December) and back again. This changes sun angles all over Earth according to the date. See more at analemma.

== Utility ==
Heliodons can mimic latitude, time of day, and date. They must also show a clear north-south direction on their surface in order to orient models. Some heliodons are very elaborate, using tracks in a high ceiling to carry a light across a large studio. Others are very simple, using a sundial as a guide to the adjustments and the sun of the day as a light source. In general, the date adjustment causes the most difficulty for the heliodon designer, while the light source presents the most problems in use. The parallel rays of the sun are not easy to duplicate with an artificial light at a useful scale, while the real sun is no respecter of deadlines or class hours.

All heliodons can benefit by including a moveable, tiltable device that can be set to match any surface on a model to show angle of incidence. The angle of incidence device indicates the relative intensity of the direct beam on the surface. The device consists of a diagram of concentric rings around a shadow-casting pointer perpendicular to the diagram. Each ring represents a percent of the direct solar beam incident on the surface. The percentage varies from 100%—the ray runs straight down the pointer perpendicular to the diagram—to zero—the ray runs parallel to the diagram and misses surface. The cosine of the angle of incidence gives the percentage. A cosine of 0.9, 90%, for example, corresponds to an angle of incidence of 26.84 degrees. The radius of the ring for the angle is equal to its tangent times the height of the shadow casting pointer. A 45 degree angle of incidence would generate a cosine of about .7, 70%, for example. Since the tangent of 45 degrees is 1, the radius of the 70% ring would be equal to the height of the shadow-casting rod.

== Types of Heliodon ==
=== Manual Tabletop Heliodon ===
Manual Tabletop heliodons are used for sun shading analysis at any given latitude and at any time. The model support platform is mounted on a conventional table or desk. It can rotate and tilt a scaled architectural model. These heliodons are manually operated without the use of computers and provide good accuracy. The model stand, mounted on the table, is tilted for latitude and rotated to get the time of the day. For replicating the time of the year, the single light source uses a ribbon marked with months of the year and attached to the edge of the door. The device can be used in interior spaces with lamps and exterior spaces with direct sunlight for better accuracy. While using outdoors, a sundial controls the tilt and rotation of the model stand. The main advantage is its affordability and small size. The heliodon is accurate when utilized by people who are already aware of solar geometry. But not good for learning solar geometry and the basic principles of solar responsive design.

- Department of Architecture at the University of Hong Kong uses tabletop heliodon for the solar design of architectural scale models. The heliodon is mainly used for teaching and design purposes.

=== Manual Sun Emulator Heliodon ===
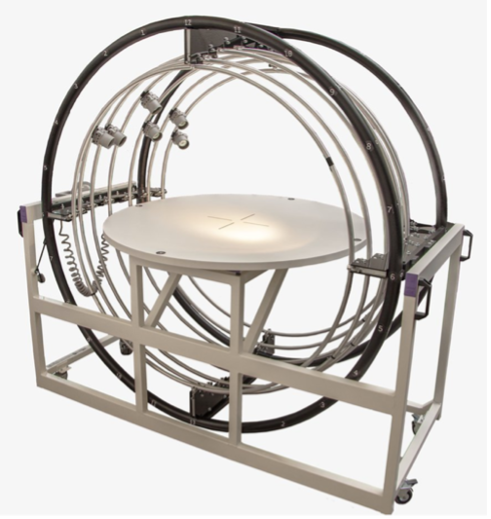
Manual Sun Emulator Heliodon

The manual heliodon consists of a flat table with a scaled model on top whereas the table lies stationary with only sun lamps in motion. The heliodon consists of a horizontal platform and seven rings that represent the sun path for the 21st day of every month which can be rotated to replicate the time of the day. It acts as a teaching tool for architects, planners, and developers. The heliodon can be used to teach solar geometry and solar responsive design principles in science museums. Without reliance on external sky conditions, it is simple to evaluate sun shading analysis at any latitude. This specific type of heliodon is intuitive to adjust and operate, allowing for minimal training to operate the device.

The relative simplicity of the helidon allows it to serve as an effective tool to those learning about solar dynamics and cardinal points.

Manual sun emulator heliodon is used in various universities such as:

- Auburn University, Alabama - The university uses a 48” (1.2 m) diameter Formica covered sun emulator heliodon known as HPD Model 126 Heliodon.
- Texas Christian University, Texas – The students at the university use sun emulator heliodon for daylight studies in lighting design projects.
- Southeastern Louisiana University, Louisiana – The university uses heliodon as an interactive tool for teaching purposes in designing solar aware architecture.
- Durham School of Engineering and Construction, Nebraska – Prof. Norbert Lechner uses sun emulator heliodon to explain sun shading analysis of scale model.
- CERES Center at Ball State University, Indiana
- Judson College, Alabama

=== Robotic Heliodon with Fixed Light Source ===
This type of robotic heliodons is the most accurate sun simulator. It is used to evaluate scale models in a compact space with a fixed light source with the support of a robotic platform. It is an automatically operated heliodon in which a physical model is accurately positioned with the help of computers around two axes. The robotic heliodon can process frequent tests and evaluations on bigger and heavier models than the manual ones to produce precise results for experiments. They are used for daylighting studies in universities, research facilities and development laboratories for sustainable building designs.

Some robotic heliodons use a mirror to fold the light path and allow the installation in a small room. The room is normally kept dark without windows and the walls, ceilings and floors are usually in black.

Robotic Heliodon is used in architectural schools, research laboratories and large engineering firms such as:

- EPFL Solar Energy and Building Physics Laboratory LESO-PB in Lausanne (laboratory-made heliodon) uses a robotic heliodon for the simulation of direct light. This heliodon is combined with a sky scanning simulator (artificial sky) to predict the light distribution in a building over the entire year. The tool can replicate direct sunlight at any location on earth. This heliodon is a laboratory-made tool that allows daylighting simulations produced inside scale models for various research and design purposes. The daylighting laboratory manufactured this tool to limit energy savings and increase user comfort through better utilisation of daylighting in buildings. The instrument allows architects, designers, and planners to understand the effect of their architectural concepts. Besides limiting energy consumption, the laboratory focuses to increase the health of building occupants and productivity through efficient use of daylighting. Moreover, the robotic heliodon will help the laboratory’s aim to achieve energy efficiency and renewable energy in buildings and cities.
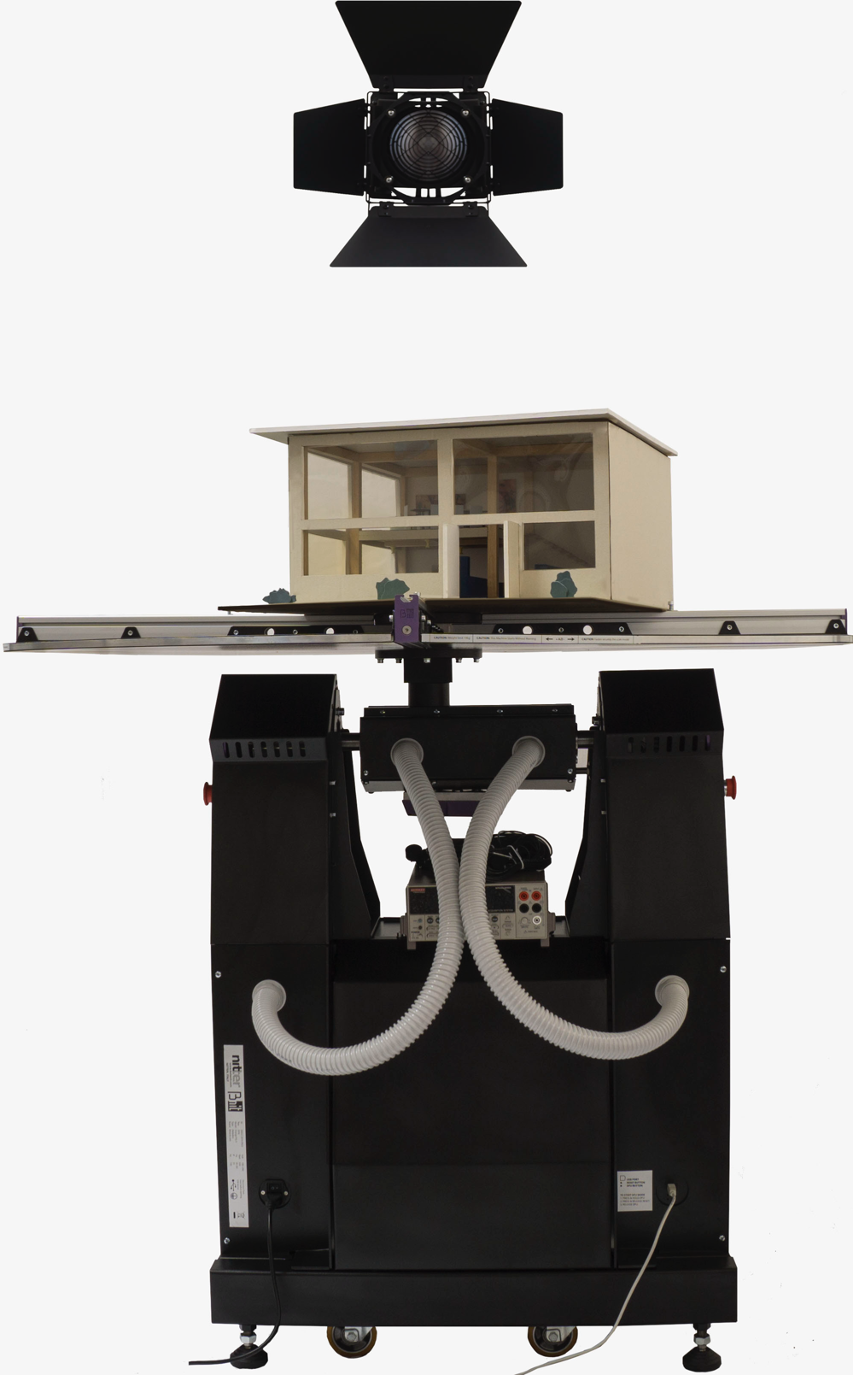
  Robotic Heliodon with fixed light source used at Arup and National Laboratory for Housing and Sustainable Communities
- National Laboratory for Housing and Sustainable Communities at Sonora, Mexico uses Orange heliodon produced by Betanit. The robotic heliodon is used for evaluating solar paths and their interaction with pre-existing or new constructions. By using a scale physical model under the robotic heliodon, it helps the project to measure the comfort and energy efficiency of the building. The heliodon is efficient as the project considers climatic conditions and the integration of energy sources. As the building is situated in a hot dry climate, the automatic heliodon helped in providing design solutions to offer indirect natural lighting and ventilation while avoiding direct sunlight into the building’s interior spaces. Due to the accuracy of the robotic heliodon, several studies with photos were used to compare a built house with a solar simulated scale model. The results revealed the efficiency of using appropriate design features in the building, which was derived from automatic heliodon.
- Arup (London), an engineering firm uses orange heliodon produced by Betanit in their lighting lab to help simulate the sun for their experiments and buildings. The lighting simulation from the heliodon helps in quickly identifying the daylight penetration on the buildings. Arup uses the robotic heliodon to design sustainable, energy-efficient, and award-winning concepts in lighting. The engineers and experts analyse daylighting of buildings by replicating the sun for their innovative projects. Furthermore, a thesis project, supervised by Dr Francesco Anselmo, also utilised the heliodon for experimental purposes. The heliodon is also used for curvature and annual reflectivity studies of “Leaf” at Arup in coordination with Betanit.

=== Robotic Heliodon with Fixed Model ===
This robotic heliodon is fully automated with a computer and has lights that go around the fixed scale model placed horizontally on the table. This kind of robotic heliodon is used separately or integrated with dome artificial sky for presentation, lighting design and research purposes. While in use with the artificial sky, the combined tool can replicate both the Sun and the sky for great accuracy and obtain results of the daylight study. The fixed scale model can be bigger and heavier models than the other types which allow the source to go around the model for obtaining evaluation results, conducting presentations and observation. The robotic heliodon allows people to move easily around and inside it for daylighting studies.

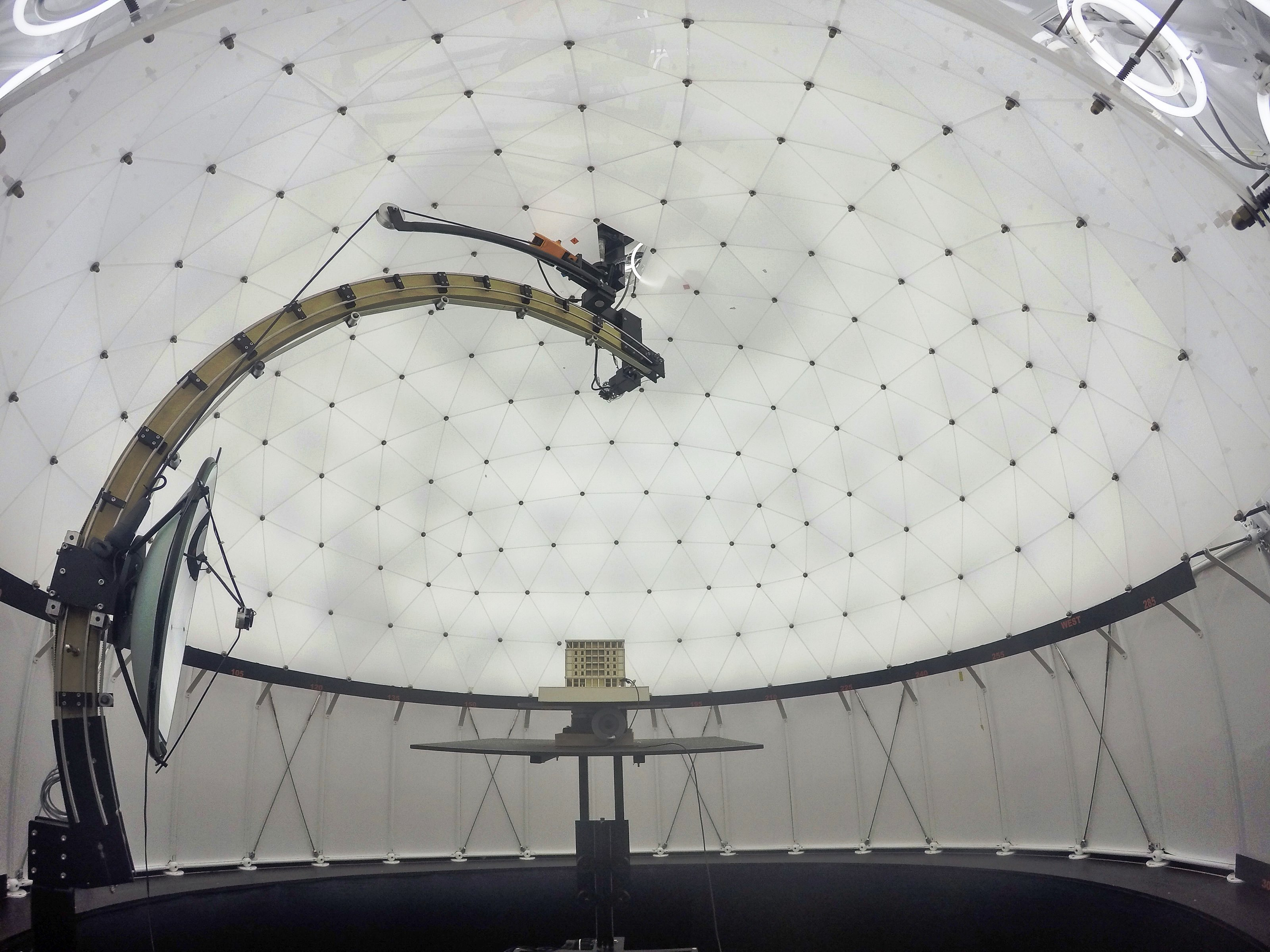
Daylight Planning Lab - Stuttgart Technology University of Applied Sciences (HFT Stuttgart)

The automated robotic heliodon with a fixed model is used in research facilities, lighting companies and university laboratories such as:

- University of Kansas Lighting Research Lab, Lawrence, United States uses a heliodon sunlight simulator for daylight studies and research purposes. The device was developed by Dr Hongyi Cai and custom-made in China by Quanzhou HuaTian Measurement Equipment LLC. The simulation tool has the ability of 3D angular movements of the scale model of buildings around a fixed point of the model at a precision of 0.1^{o}. The heliodon is installed in the darkroom for teaching purposes, research, and daylighting studies.
- HFT, Stuttgart University of Applied Sciences, Stuttgart uses a robotic heliodon at their Daylight Planning Lab. The lab uses two elements in their daylight simulator – an artificial sky and artificial sun. The artificial sun simulator consists of a halogen bulb with a parabolic reflector to replicate parallel sunlight. The heliodon integrated an artificial sky of 4.20m diameter with 30 fluorescent lamps. The control panel allows the replication of any solar orbit at any day and any global location. This integration facilitates the reproduction of the sky’s brightness and the circumsolar radiation in great accuracy. The architecture and design department uses the device for teaching purposes, daylight study, shadow study and research.
- Bartenbach, Tyrol – the lighting firm uses a heliodon (inside an artificial sky of 6.5m diameter) with many small lamps for daylighting design with visualization models and calculations. The lighting firm uses heliodon for daylight simulation in research and development for complex building structures. The firm uses the tool for architectural lighting design used for green building certification, reports, and consultations.
- United Arab Emirates University (UAEU) uses a powerful robotic heliodon made by betanit.com inside a full-dome artificial sky to evaluate daylighting of scale models with great accuracy. The heliodon is powered by a 1200W HMI lamp with a custom-designed optical setup able to reproduce a range of 200,000 lx to 600,000 lx on the table supporting the scale model. The robotic heliodon with the artificial sky is used for research purposes in sustainable building design and technology.
