= Solar access =

Sun path polar chart; latitude based on Rotterdam

Solar access is the ability of one property to continue to receive sunlight across property lines without obstruction from another’s property (buildings, foliage or other impediment). Solar access is calculated using a sun path diagram.

Solar access is differentiated from solar rights or solar easement, which is specifically meant for direct sunlight for solar energy systems, whereas solar access is a right to sunlight upon certain building façades regardless of the presence of active or passive solar energy systems.

== History ==
A historical example of Solar access is Ancient Lights, a doctrine based on English law that refers to a negative easement that prevents the owner or occupier of an adjoining structure from building or placing on his own land anything that has the effect of obstructing the light of the dominant tenement. In common law, a person's window on his property receiving flow of light that passed through it for so long a time as to constitute immemorial usage in law, the flow of light became an “ancient light” that the law protected from disturbance. The Prescription Act 1832 created a statutory prescription for light. It provided that:

When the access and use of light to and for (any building) shall have been actually enjoyed therewith for the full period of 20 years without interruption, the right thereto shall be deemed absolute and indefeasible, any local usage or custom to the contrary notwithstanding, unless it shall appear that the same was enjoyed by some consent or agreement, expressly made or given for that purpose by deed or writing...

== Solar access in urban planning ==
The goal of using solar access in urban planning is to create well-designed urban districts that assure exposure of buildings' elevations and public spaces to the sun during a desired period of the year. Urban areas that do not consider solar access may cause discomfort inside buildings and on the street, as well as increase energy consumption for lighting and heating, due to the lack of passive solar energy. On the other hand, as a result, buildings without solar access may also have less solar heat gain and thus reduced cooling load.

=== Solar envelope ===
The solar envelope is a space-time construct. Its spatial limits are defined by the characteristics of land size, shape, orientation, topography, latitude, and its surroundings. Its time limits are defined by the hours of the day, season of the year, and the time interval. In 1976, solar envelope was first proposed by Ralph L. Knowles as a zoning device. It guarantees solar access to properties by regulating construction limits derived from the sun’s relative motion. Buildings within the solar envelope would not shadow adjacent properties during a predefined period of time, usually critical energy-receiving periods during the year. The solar envelope presents the maximum heights of buildings that do not violate the solar access of any existing buildings during a given period of the year. The solar envelope is a way to assure urban solar access for both energy and life quality.

The concept of solar envelope was first developed in 1969. It was developed as a framework for architecture and urban design at the University of Southern California. The goal of that study was to improve the quality of the urban environment by designing buildings that pay attentions to orientations. In 1976, a research was carried out by Ralph L. Knowles to further develop the concept of solar envelope as a public zoning policy. Assisted by planning department of the city of Los Angeles, the results of this research were first published in an article called Solar Energy, Building, and the Law. In 1977, to test the solar envelope concept as a zoning mechanism, Richard D. Berry joined with Knowles to direct undergraduate architecture students in designing buildings within solar envelopes based on a presumption of solar zoning on real urban sites in Los Angeles.

==== Precedents ====
The first implementation of the idea of solar access was in the United States around 10th century. In Acoma, 50 miles west of modern Albuquerque, New Mexico, its rows of house are stepped down to the south. Those houses were built for the high-desert climate. The low angle sun in the winter is welcomed and the high angle summer sun is not wanted. During the winter time, houses do not shadow one another. It is this critical relationship of building-height to shadow-area that gave rise to the solar-envelope concept.

==== Legal background ====
The most commonly cited law outside the United States is the English Doctrine of Ancient Lights, but there were problems with its application in modern society. Roughly, the doctrine states that if in 20 years no one has overshadowed your property, they cannot now do so. However, this doctrine has been repeatedly disavowed in U.S. courts.

Prior appropriation principle was used for the United States water law, which was developed during the west settlement. Similar to the Ancient Lights doctrine, prior appropriation water rights states that the first person to take water for "beneficial use," such as agricultural or household use, has the right to continue use the same amount of water for the same purpose. Simply put, “He who gets there first, gets the most”.

Zoning regulations provide a foundation for regulating solar rights. Since the type of construction is unlikely to change within a zoning district, local administrations do not have to deal with the complexity of different building types when assuring solar rights to each property.

==== Space-time construct ====
The solar envelope is a space-time construct. In terms of space, a solar envelope assures solar access to the surrounding properties. Solar envelope defines shadow fences that avoid unacceptable shadow beyond the property lines by limiting the size the building on-site. Solar envelope also offers the greatest potential volume within time constraints, also known as cut-off times. Within the time constraint, for example 9am to 5pm in the winter and 7am to 7pm in the summer, the solar envelope defines the biggest volume that a construction can have to avoid casting shadows off-site. As the periods of assured solar access increases, the solar envelope's size would decrease. During winter time, due to lower angle sun, the increase of the cut-off time has greater impact to the size of the solar envelope than in the summer time when the sun angle is high.

==== Solar envelope generation ====
A solar envelope can be generated for any land parcel during any time interval using the following methods: the heliodon (sun-simulating machine), descriptive geometry, or computers software (e.g Autodesk Revit and DIVA for Grasshopper in Rhino). Given a site, and its location and orientation, a heliodon can be used to determine the Solar azimuth angle and altitude angle for any given time. Four critical time points are typically used to determine the solar envelope: morning and afternoon cut-off time during the winter and summer solstice. If the information in regards to solar positions and site geometry are known, the solar envelope can be directly calculated using trigonometry. The current computer software can be the easiest and fastest way for calculating the solar envelope using the same principle that is being used in the heliodon method.

==== Impact on building design ====
When required to design within the solar envelope, designers naturally prefer certain architectural features. Commercial buildings designed within the solar envelope tend to be short and flat than thin and tall. Terraces and courtyards are often favored to make the best use of the envelope’s volume.

The practical approach to apply solar envelope to the zoning regulation was to require developers or property owners to provide the solar envelope description with the normal land survey prior to the preparation of construction drawings and the filing for building permits. Compliance would be checked by city building departments.

=== The influence of street orientation ===
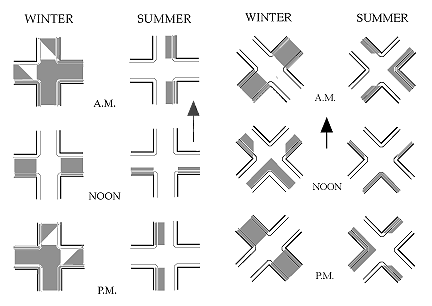
The importance of street orientation for solar access

Ildefons Cerdà's Eixample of Barcelona is credited as being a good example of an orthogonal town-plan street orientation for increased solar access. By rotating the grid to a 45 degree angle from southernly orientation, the morning and afternoon sunlight is able to penetrate into the urban fabric more than in a north-south oriented grid. The so-called "Spanish grid" was also applied in Los Angeles, though in newer parts of the city a north-south grid was used. The Spanish grid is advantageous regarding street qualities of light and heat. During the winter, every street on the Spanish grid receives direct light and heat sometime between 9AM and 3PM, the six hours of greatest insolation. It is true that at midday, all streets have shadows; but because of their diagonal orientation, more sunlight enters than if they ran due east-west. In summer, the advantage of the Spanish grid is that shadows are cast into every street all day long, creating a more comfortable environment in hot climates, with the exception of a short period during mid- morning and mid-afternoon when the sun passes quickly over first one diagonal street and then the other.

== Solar access laws ==
=== The Netherlands ===
In the Dutch building codes, the principal façade of houses must receive 3 hours of direct sunlight between 21 March and 21 September, the vernal point and autumnal points of the equinox. when the solar elevation is about 38°. For East and West oriented houses, the solar elevation is lowered to 32°, which reflects the sun’s path across the sky.

=== United States ===
Legal experts have suggested that American water law, especially the doctrine of prior appropriation, may offer a more useful precedent for sun rights. They point out that both sunlight and water are used rather than captured and sold; both may be consumed, but both are renewable. In addition, there is an equivalence between upstream and downstream in water law and the geometry of solar shadowing. But, like the Doctrine of Ancient Lights, there are problems with the application of water law. At the moment, Solar access laws are usually “voluntary,” meaning that a solar owner cannot require that their neighbor agree to a solar easement.

==== State of Massachusetts ====
State law provides a solar access permit, and also provides for solar access in zoning ordinances, including the regulation of planting and trimming of vegetation on public property to protect solar access.

==== State of California ====
State law limits vegetation growth on neighboring properties under some circumstances.

==== Washington, DC ====
Zoning regulations in Washington DC require that "Any addition, including a roof structure or penthouse, shall not significantly interfere with the operation of an existing or permitted solar energy system of at least 2kW on an adjacent property..." The regulation goes on to define "significant interference" as no more than 5%, and includes the ability of neighbor/developer & solar owner to come to an agreement that allows infringement. While most solar access provisions limit vegetation growth, the DC provisions limit permitted construction of neighbors (and don't address vegetation).

==== City of Boulder, Colorado ====
Zoning regulations in the City of Boulder contain a Solar Access section.

== See also ==
- Daylighting
- Effect of sun angle on climate
- Theories of urban planning
- History of urban planning
- Sun path
- Passive solar building design
