= Daylight harvesting =

Automatically variable electric lighting

Daylight harvesting systems use daylight to offset the amount of electric lighting needed to properly light a space, in order to reduce energy consumption. This is accomplished using lighting control systems that are able to dim or switch electric lighting in response to changing daylight availability. The term Daylight Harvesting has become the standard in the fields of lighting, sustainable architecture, and active daylighting industries.

== System design and components ==
Daylight harvesting systems are typically designed to maintain a minimum recommended light level. This light level will vary according to the needs and use of the space; for example, the commonly recommended light level for offices is 500 lux (or around 50 foot-candles) on the desktop.

== Photosensors ==
All daylight harvesting systems use a light level sensor, a photosensor, to detect the prevailing light level, luminance or brightness, in open-loop or closed-loop systems. Photosensors are used to adjust electric lighting based on the available daylight in the space. In an open-loop system, the photosensor detects the amount of available daylight only, and can be positioned on the building's exterior wall or roof, or inside the building facing the window or skylight. In a closed-loop system, the photosensor detects the total photometric amount of light, from both daylight and electric sources in the space. For example, in an office a closed-loop photosensor can be positioned on the ceiling facing the desktops in order to detect the amount of light on the work surface, as placing the sensor on the desktop itself would be impractical. When sensors were placed on desktops in an office building, an penalty of 24% on energy saving occurred. In both the open- and closed-loop configurations, the signal from the photosensor must be carefully calibrated to accurately indicate the effect of exterior daylight variations on the light level on 'important function' areas in the space.

== Control modules and dimming ==
The signal from the photosensor is interpreted by a lighting control system module, an automated light switching device, in the electric lighting system which can reduce the electric lighting, by shutting off or dimming fixtures as appropriate. If the electric lighting is dimmable, then the artificial lighting may be continuously adjusted in proportion to the amount of daylight available. If the electric lighting is on-off only, then an electric lighting fixture or lamp must remain on at full output until daylight can meet the entire recommended light level for the space. Non-dimming variants include having multiple non-adjacent light fixtures such as alternate units in the ceiling 'grid layout,' or daylight source adjacent fixtures near windows or skylights, linked for module on-off switching. Another variant of on-off switching is step switching (sometimes referred to as "bi-level switching"), in which multiple lamps in a single light fixture can be switched on and off independent of each other. This allows for typically one or two steps between full output and zero.

Dimming systems are generally more expensive than on-off systems. They have the potential to save more energy, because they can reduce electric light output when daylight can only partially meet the needs of the space. However, dimming systems may also require a little more energy for their basic operation. If a dimming system is well-calibrated, the occupants of the space will not notice changes in electric lighting due to daylight harvesting, whereas they are very likely to notice the changes due to on-off or step switching.

== Energy savings ==
Several studies have recorded the energy savings due to daylight harvesting. Energy savings for electric lighting in the range of 20-60% are common. Savings are very dependent on the type of space the light harvesting control system is deployed in, and its usage. Clearly, savings can only accrue in spaces with substantial daylight where electric lighting would have been otherwise used. Therefore, daylight harvesting works best in spaces with access to conventional or clerestory windows, skylights, light tube groups, glass block walls, and other passive daylighting sources from sunlight; and where electric lighting would otherwise be left on for long periods. Such spaces have included offices, atria, interior public multistory plazas and shopping mall courts, and schools.

It is too simplistic to try to increase energy savings by increasing the size of windows. Daylight over-illumination may cause glare for occupants, causing them to deploy blinds or other window shading devices, and compromising the daylight harvesting system. Even partially deployed venetian blinds can cut energy savings in half.

Energy savings estimates may not be realized in practice due to poor system design, calibration, or commissioning. Systems that dim or switch electric lighting in a distracting manner, or that produce overall light levels that are perceived as too low, can be sabotaged by occupants. (For example, simply taping over a sensor will create constant electric lighting at maximum output.)

The adoption of daylight harvesting technologies has been hampered by high costs and imperfect performance of the technologies. However, studies have shown that by using daylight harvesting technologies, owners can see an average annual energy savings of 24%.

One method of predicting energy savings is to use commercially available software programs, such as TRACE 700 or (freeware) DOE-2, which considers thermal loads.

== Payback, and drivers for adoption ==
There is an incremental cost to daylight harvesting systems. Dividing this cost by the annual energy savings provides a "simple payback", the number of years for the system to pay for itself. The shorter the calculated payback period, the more likely it is that a building owner will invest in the system. Costs vary for a whole host of local factors, but generally if energy costs rise, or the cost of the control hardware and installation falls, the payback period will be reduced.

== Sustainability ==
The green building-sustainable building movement encourages sustainable architecture design and building practices. Various green building ecolabel certification marks exist worldwide, such as LEED, BOMA Best, BREEAM, HKBeam, and Green Star. All of these programs offer points for various building design features that promote sustainability, and certification at various levels is awarded for reaching a given number of points. One of the principal ways to gain points is through energy saving measures. Therefore, daylight harvesting is a common feature of green buildings. Thus green building practices are increasing the production of daylight harvesting components, leading to lower prices.
Many electric utilities provide financial incentives for their customers to save energy. One such incentive is rebates on daylight harvesting systems, which also reduces payback periods.

In addition, energy codes and standards are beginning to address daylight harvesting. For example, the California Energy Code Title 24-2008 recognizes primary and secondary daylight zones. At least 50% of the general lighting in primary zones must be controlled separately from other lighting, with automatic control required for larger zones. The code encourages automatic daylight harvesting in secondary zones by awarding power adjustment factor credits that can be applied to the lighting design. The 2009 International Energy Conservation Code (IECC) recognizes daylight zones around vertical fenestration and skylights, and requires that the lighting in these zones be controlled separately from the general lighting in the space. The 2010 ASHRAE 90.1 energy standard, expected to be published in the fall 2010, is also expected to address daylight harvesting. Meanwhile, ASHRAE 189.1, the first of a generation of sustainable construction codes, defines daylight zones and requires daylight harvesting control.

== See also ==
- Daylighting
- Passive daylighting
- Active daylighting
- Illuminance
- Brightness
- Sustainability
- Sustainable architecture
- Sustainable design
