= SGD (disambiguation) =

SGD is the ISO 4217 code of the Singapore dollar, the currency of Singapore.

SGD or sgd can also mean:

- Saccharomyces Genome Database, a yeast database
- Sargodha, a Pakistani city
- Secure global desktop, software by Tarantella, subsequently bought and used by Sun Microsystems and by Oracle Corporation
- SG Dynamo Dresden, a German association-football club
- Sliding glass door, a type of sliding door
- Small group discussions
- Smart Grid Device, an electronic device for smart grids
- Sønderborg Airport (IATA code SGD)
- Spanish Gangster Disciples, an American gang
- Speech-generating device, an electronic augmentative and alternative communication systems
- Stars Go Dim, an American pop-rock band
- Stochastic gradient descent, an optimization algorithm
- Submarine groundwater discharge, freshwater aquifer seepage into oceans
- Surigaonon language, based on its ISO 639-3 code sgd

== See also ==
- SDG
