= Sliding glass door =

Large glass outerwall door

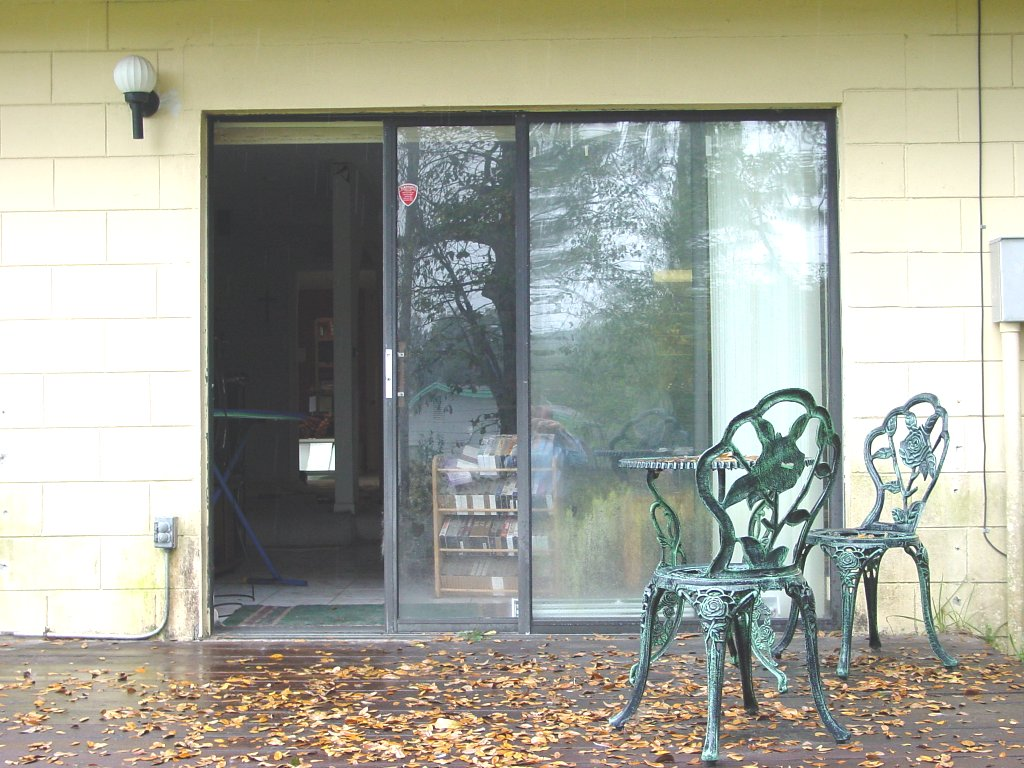
A sliding glass door

In architecture and construction, a sliding glass door (also patio door or doorwall) is a type of sliding door made predominantly from glass, that is situated in an external wall to provide egress and light. The doors can give access to a backyard or patio while providing a pleasant view, and when not fully covered can be a source of passive daylighting. Like a window, when open it also provides fresh air and copious natural light. It is considered a single unit consisting of two or more panel sections, some or all being mobile to slide open. Another design, a wall-sized glass pocket door has one or more panels movable and sliding into wall pockets, completely disappearing for a 'wide open' indoor-outdoor room experience.

The sliding glass door was introduced as a significant element of pre-war International style architecture in Europe and North America. Their predecessor is the sliding Shōji and Fusuma panel door in traditional Japanese architecture. The post-war building boom in modernist and Mid-century modern styles, and on to suburban ranch-style tract houses, multi-unit housing, and hotel-motel chains has made them a standard element in residential and hospitality building construction in many regions and countries.

== Terminology ==
"Handedness" of a sliding door is expressed as seen by an observer outside the building. When standing outside, a left-handed door opens from left to right (when closed, the handle is on the far left), and a right-handed door opens from right to left (when closed, the handle is on the far right). These relationships are sometimes described with the letters O and X, where O is the fixed panel and X is the sliding panel. The O/X notation allows the description of doors with more than two panels.

Sliding-door terminology
Denotaton	Panels	Panel motion	Description
OX or right-handed	2	$- \leftarrow$	Right panel slides left
XO or left-handed	2	$\rightarrow -$	Left panel slides right
OX-O	3	$- \leftarrow -$	Center panel slides left
O-XO	3	$- \rightarrow -$	Center panel slides right
XOOX	4	$\rightarrow - - \leftarrow$	Outer panels slide toward the center
OXXO	4	$- \leftarrow \rightarrow -$	Center panels slide toward outer ones

== Design options ==
=== Traditional ===
The traditional sliding doors design has two-panel sections, one fixed-stationary and one mobile to slide open. The actual sliding door is a movable rectangular framed sheet of window glass that is mounted parallel to a similar and often fixed similarly framed neighboring glass partition. The movable panel slides in a fixed track usually, and in its own plane parallel to the neighboring stationary panel.

A specialty form, for Washitsu or "Japanese-style rooms," creates sliding Shōji and Fusuma panel doors, with traditional materials for interior uses and contemporary adaptations for exterior exposure and uses. They are used in themed and contemporary restaurants, residences, Japanese garden tea houses, and other situations. Specialty manufacturers are located in Japan and Western countries

=== Disappearing ===
Another sliding doors design, glass pocket doors has all the glass panels sliding completely into open-wall pockets, totally disappearing for a wall-less 'wide open' indoor-outdoor room experience. This can include corner window walls, for even more blurring of the inside-outside open space distinction. Two-story versions are often electronically opened, using remote controls. For wide expanses, the opening point is centered, and three to six parallel tracks are used to carry the six to twelve sliding doors into the wall pockets on each side. Their recent popularity, shelter magazine coverage and technical and structural innovations have brought many options to market.

=== Trackless and disappearing ===
A third sliding doors design has all the glass panels suspended from above, leaving a trackless and uninterrupted floor plane. They also disappear into side pockets. On final closure, they slightly drop down to create a weatherproof seal. A German manufacturer developed the original technology, and its use is predominantly in temperate climates.

=== Opening corner ===
The sliding glass doors can be adapted to slide away from a corner connection leaving no corner post or framing in its wake. The corner stile is made up of two vertical profiles, a male and female section, which slot together and then slide away with the sliding doors. This meeting point does not have to be 90 degrees; it can also be an inverted corner allowing these frames to fit within any design seamlessly.

=== Energy efficiency, heat loss and gain ===
Swinging glass doors are a better choice than the typical sliding glass doors, since they offer a much tighter seal, but glass – even the best type of glass, chosen according to the climate zone – is always a poor insulator, making doors based on them a poor choice from a thermal comfort perspective. To reduce their negative thermal impact on the living space, glass doors should have insulated frames and be double or triple glazed, with low-emissivity coatings and gas-filling (typically argon). Metal-framed glass doors should also have thermal breaks. The doors should be properly sized and protected (using shades, blinds, curtains and other means).

== Uses ==
Sliding glass doors are popular in Southern Europe and throughout the United States, being used in: hotel rooms, condominiums, apartments, and residences; for access to upper balconies; for large views out - enhanced natural light in; and to increase incoming fresh air. In addition Sliding glass doors are commonly used in some regions as doors between the interior rooms of a home and a courtyard, deck, balcony, patio, and a garden, backyard, barbecue or swimming pool area. They are often called patio doors in this context. They are also used in interior design, often in offices and automobile sales areas, to give soundproof but visually accessible private office space. In residential interiors they are used, often with translucent 'frosted' glass replicating a traditional Shōji door, to allow daylight to penetrate further into the dwelling and expand the sense of interior spatial size.

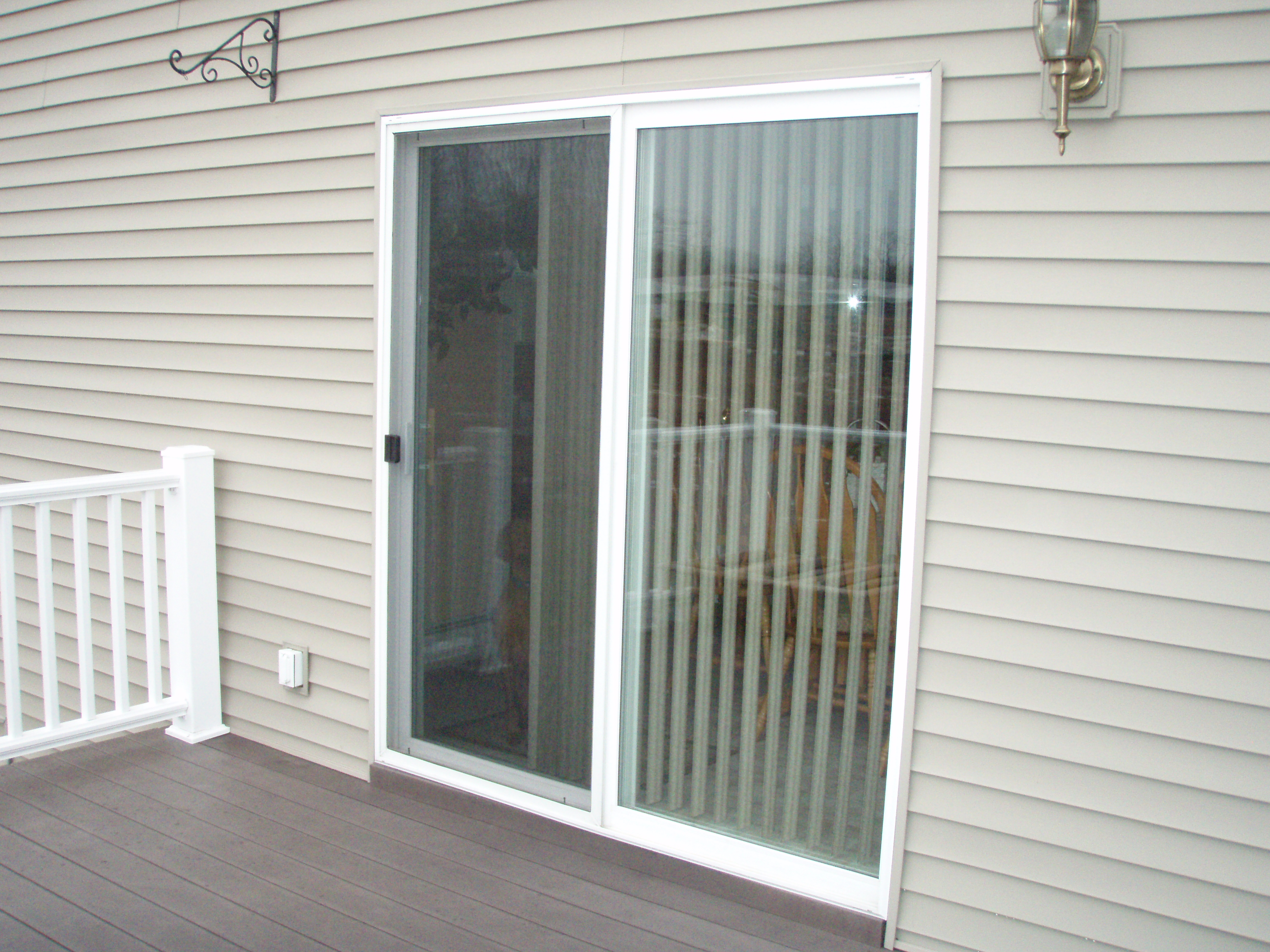
Upvc Patio doors

Special sliding glass doors called platform screen doors are used on railway platforms in order to protect waiting passengers from the elements as well as to prevent suicide attempts. They're sometimes found on bathroom shower doors.

== Fabrication ==
Sliding glass door frames are often made from wood, aluminum, stainless steel, or steel, which also have the most strength. The most common material is PVC plastic. Replacement parts are most commonly needed for the moving-sliding parts of the door, such as the steel rollers that glide within the track and the locking mechanisms.

=== Glazing ===
Glass in the doors can be either externally fitted or internally fitted, with internally fitted being the high-security design, depending on the specification the manufacturer implements in the design. To comply with energy conservation codes and for noise reduction, sliding glass doors are usually double glazed, and often treated for UV reflection. They usually have no mullions, unless attempting to appear part of a revival architectural style and then often using 'snap-on' faux grids.

=== Security ===
Security design in the doors is aimed at preventing the doors both fixed and sliding from being lifted off their rails, anti-lift blocks can be fixed to the top of the frame to prevent the lifting of the door off its rails, in theory preventing unauthorised entry to the room when sliding door is in the closed position.

A rotating security bar, commonly known as a "Charley bar" can also be fitted from inside the room to prevent the sliding action when the door is closed. A portable security bar can also be used for added security when traveling, preventing intruders from breaking in while occupants are away.

== See also ==
- French door
- Sustainable architecture
- Sustainable design
