= Succinylglutamate desuccinylase =

Class of enzymes

Identifiers
- EC no.: 3.5.1.96

Databases
- BRENDA: enzyme data
- ExPASy: NiceZyme view
- KEGG: enzyme entry
- MetaCyc: metabolic pathway
- Rhea: reactions
- PDB structures: RCSB PDB PDBe PDBsum
- Gene Ontology: AmiGO / QuickGO
Search
- PMC: articles
- PubMed: articles
- NCBI: proteins

Succinylglutamate desuccinylase (EC 3.5.1.96) is an enzyme characterised from the bacterium Pseudomonas cepacia that catalyzes the hydrolysis of N(2)-succinyl-L-glutamic acid to succinic acid and L-glutamic acid:

N(2)-succinyl-L-glutamic acid
H_{2}O
succinic acid
+
L-glutamic acid

This is the final step in the catabolism of the amino acid arginine, which begins with arginine N-succinyltransferase.

This enzyme is a hydrolase, one acting on carbon-nitrogen bonds other than peptide bonds, specifically in linear amides. The systematic name of this enzyme class is N-succinyl-L-glutamate amidohydrolase. Other names in use include N2-succinylglutamate desuccinylase, SGDS, and AstE (the gene).
