= Aste, India =

Coordinates: 15°54′N 74°36′E

Aste
- Village
- Interactive map of Aste
- Country: India
- State: Karnataka
- District: Belgaum
- Talukas: Belgaum

Government
  - Type: Panchayati raj (India)
  - Body: Gram panchayat

Languages
  - Official: Kannada
- Time zone: UTC+5:30 (IST)

Aste is a village in Belgaum district in the southern state of Karnataka, India.
