= Daylighting (architecture) =

Using sunlight for internal lighting

The main concourse of Pennsylvania Station, New York City, built in 1910. Railway stations of this era made extensive use of glass roofing to provide natural daylight to passengers below.

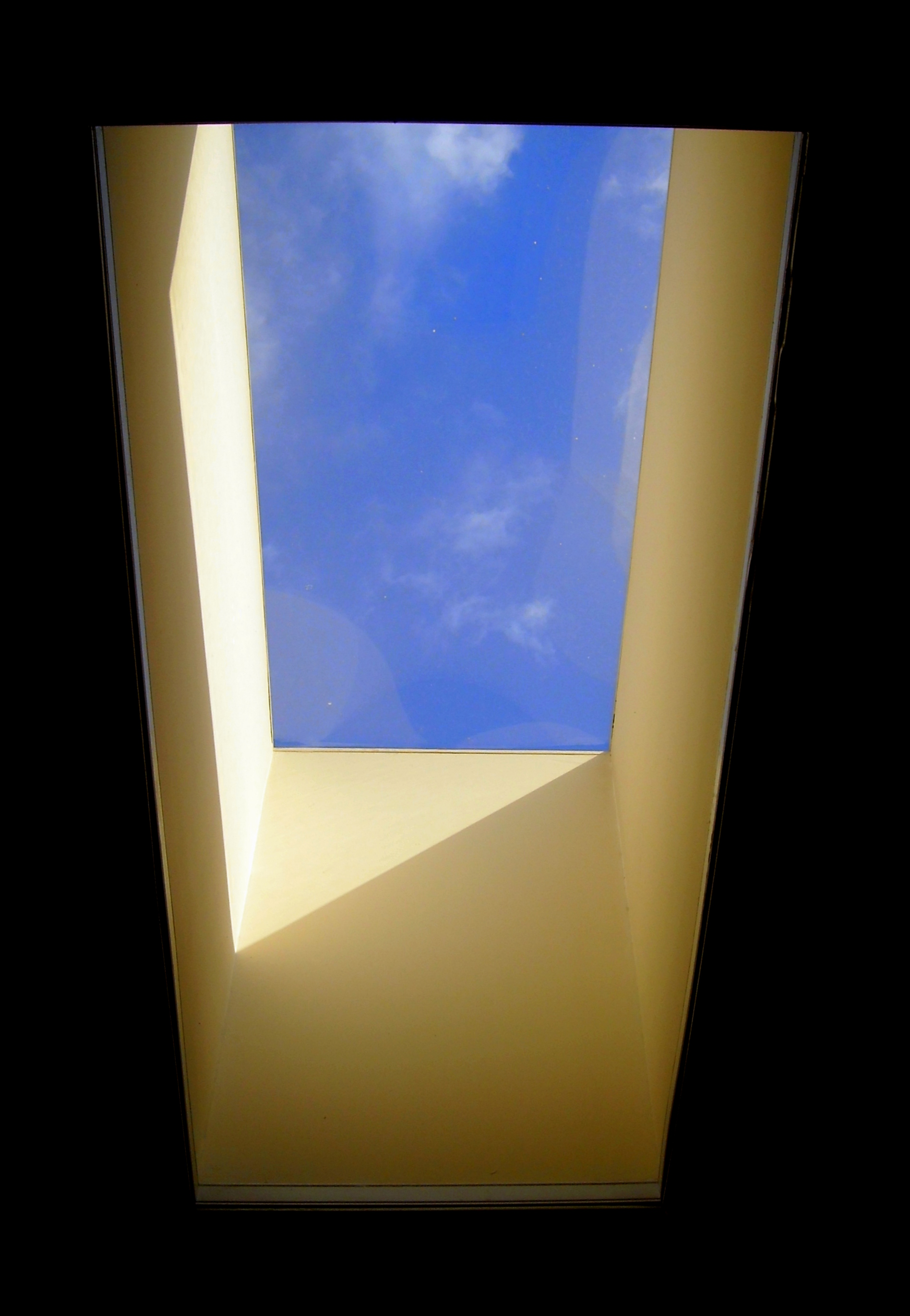
A skylight providing internal illumination

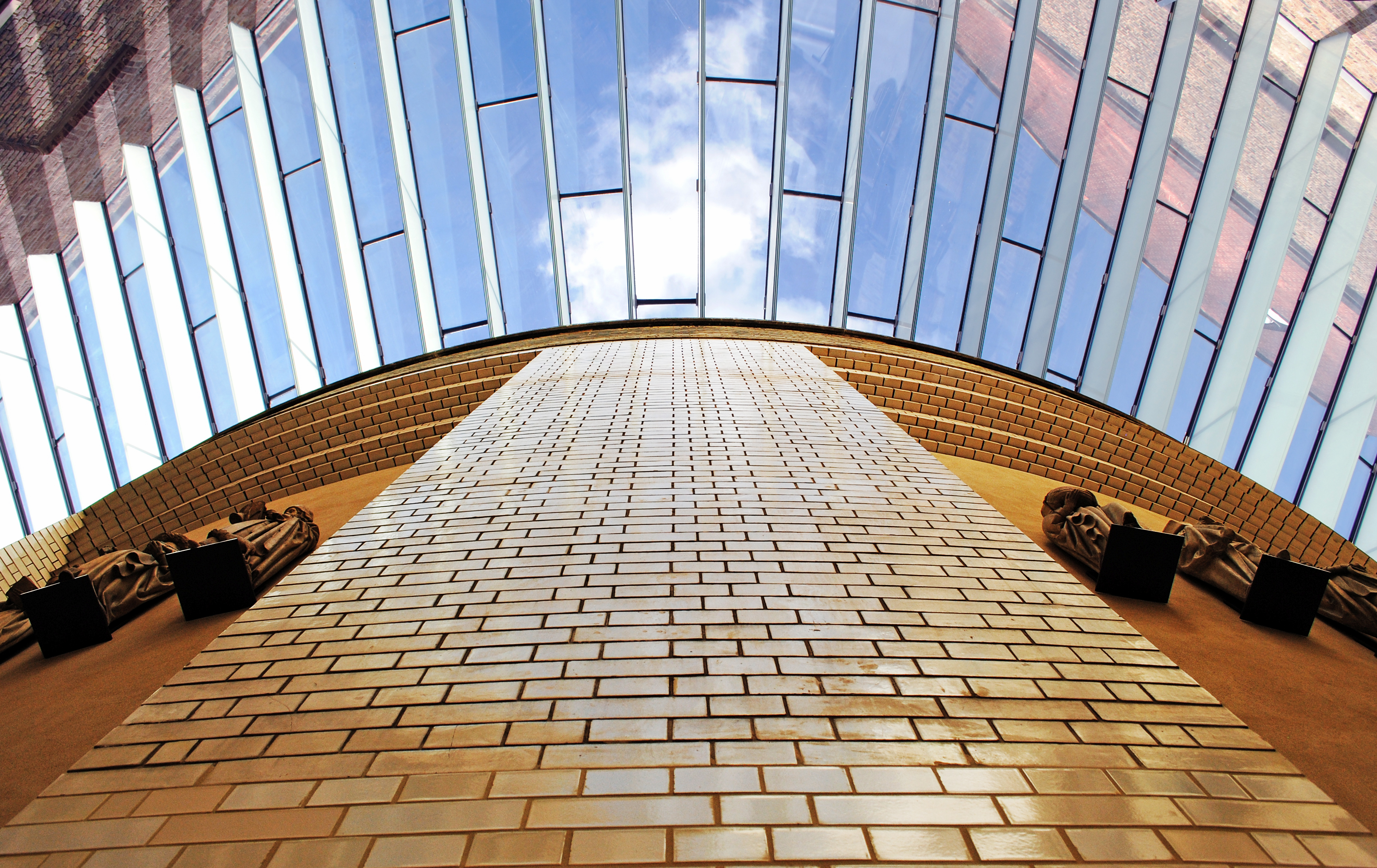
The Daylit Gallery in the Victoria and Albert Museum has an all glass roof

Daylighting is the practice of placing windows, skylights, other openings, and reflective surfaces so that direct or indirect sunlight can provide effective internal lighting. Particular attention is given to daylighting while designing a building when the aim is to maximize visual comfort or to reduce energy use. Energy savings can be achieved from the reduced use of artificial (electric) lighting or from passive solar heating. Artificial lighting energy use can be reduced by simply installing fewer electric lights where daylight is present or by automatically dimming or switching off electric lights in response to the presence of daylight – a process known as daylight harvesting.

The amount of daylight received in an internal space can be analyzed by measuring illuminance on a grid or undertaking a daylight factor calculation. Computer programs such as Radiance allow an architect or engineer to quickly calculate benefits of a particular design. The human eye's response to light is non-linear, so a more even distribution of the same amount of light makes a room appear brighter.

The proportion of direct to diffuse light impacts the amount and quality of daylight. "Direct sunlight" reaches a site without being scattered within Earth's atmosphere. Sunlight that is scattered in the atmosphere is "diffused daylight". Sunlight reflected off walls and the ground also contributes to daylighting. Each climate has different composition of these daylights and different cloud coverage, so daylighting strategies vary with site locations and climates. At latitudes north of the Tropic of Cancer and south of the Tropic of Capricorn, there is no direct sunlight on the polar-side wall of a building between the autumnal equinox and the vernal equinox (that is, from the September equinox to the March equinox in the Northern Hemisphere, and from the March equinox to the September equinox in the Southern Hemisphere.) In the Northern Hemisphere, the north-facing wall is the "polar-side" and in the Southern Hemisphere, it is the south-facing wall.

Traditionally, houses were designed with minimal windows on the polar side, but more and larger windows on the equatorial side (south-facing wall in the Northern Hemisphere and north-facing wall in the Southern Hemisphere). Equatorial-side windows receive at least some direct sunlight on any sunny day of the year (except in the tropics in summer), so they are effective at daylighting areas of the house adjacent to the windows. At higher latitudes during midwinter, light incidence is highly directional and casts long shadows. This may be partially ameliorated through light diffusion, light pipes or tubes, and through somewhat reflective internal surfaces. At fairly low latitudes in summertime, windows that face east and west and sometimes those that face toward the nearer pole receive more sunlight than windows facing toward the equator.

== Types ==
Passive daylighting is a system of both collecting sunlight using static, non-moving, and non-tracking systems (such as windows, sliding glass doors, most skylights, light tubes) and reflecting the collected daylight deeper inside with elements such as light shelves. Passive daylighting systems are different from active daylighting systems in that active systems track and/or follow the sun, and rely on mechanical mechanisms to do so.

=== Windows ===
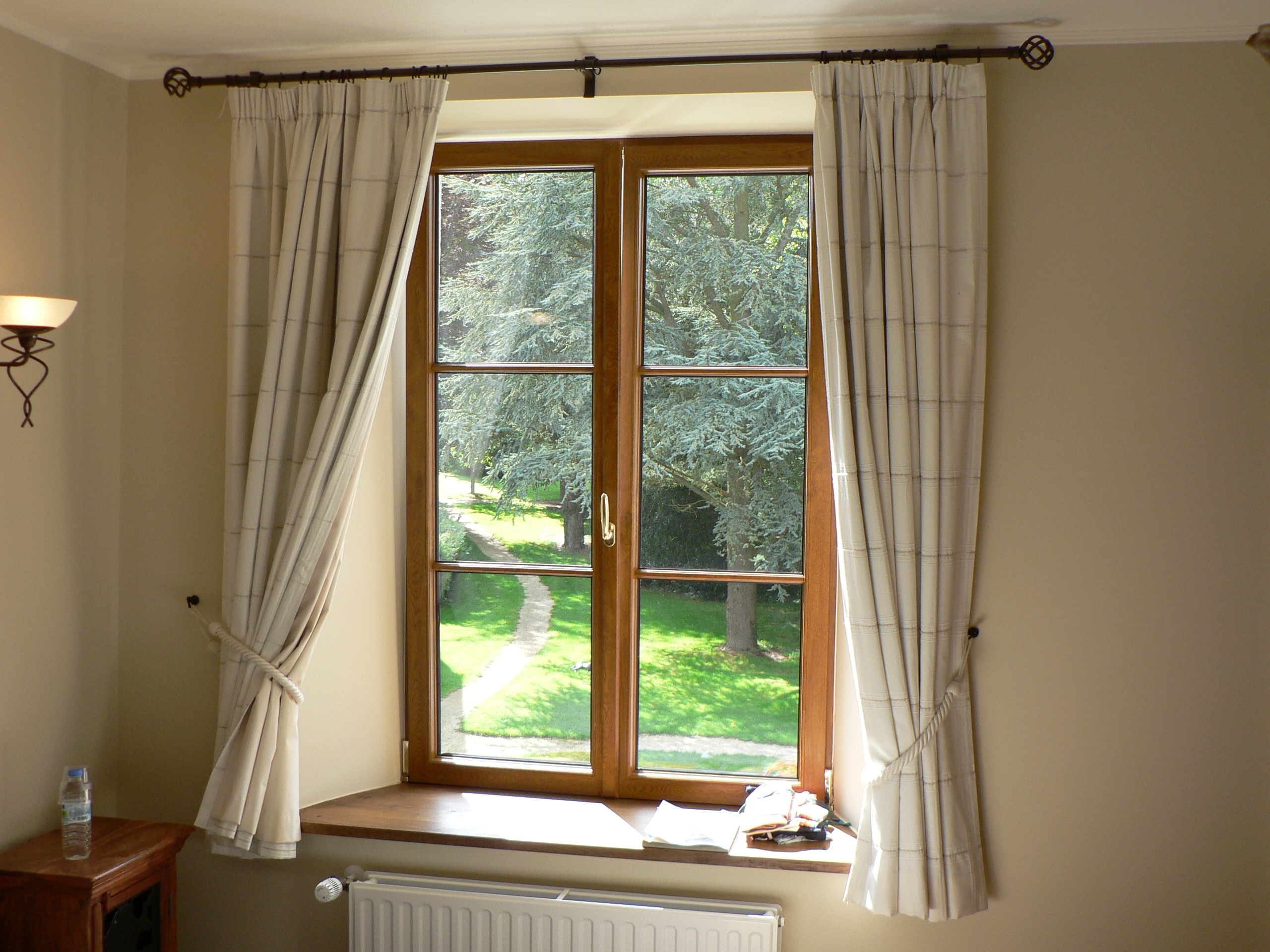
A conventional window

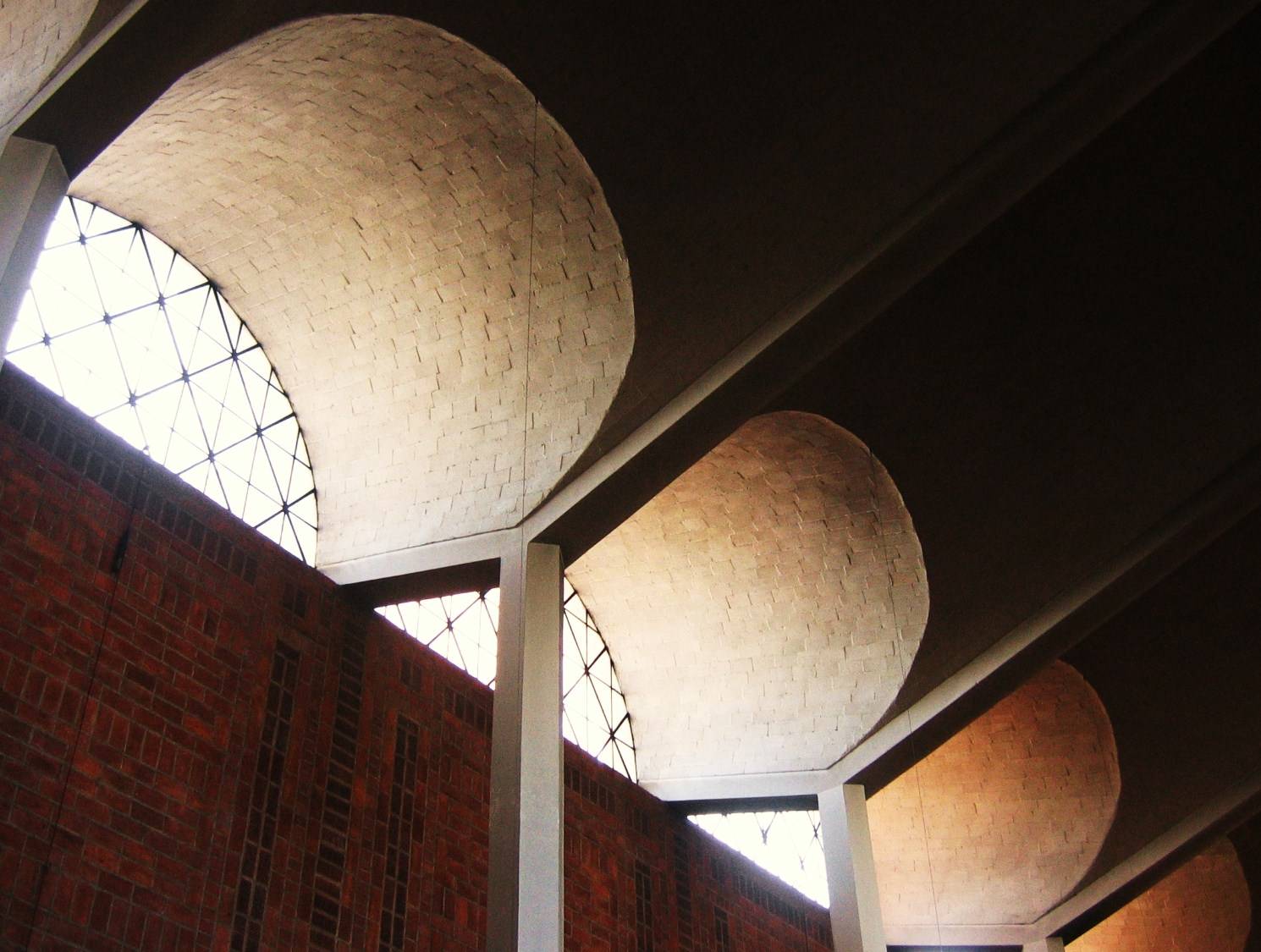
Clerestory windows

Windows are the most common way to admit daylight into a space. Their vertical orientation means that they selectively admit sunlight and diffuse daylight at different times of the day and year. Therefore, windows on multiple orientations must usually be combined to produce the right mix of light for the building, depending on the climate and latitude. There are three ways to improve the amount of light available from a window: (a) placing the window close to a light colored wall, (b) slanting the sides of window openings so the inner opening is larger than the outer opening, or (c) using a large light colored window-sill to project light into the room. Besides permitting daylighting into the building, windows serve another function in daylighting practice, providing views out. To enhance the quality of the view seen from a window, three primary variables need to be ensure: view content (what can be seen in the view), view access (how much of the window view can be seen), and view clarity (how clearly the view can be seen). View clarity is often influenced by the amount of shading provided by blinds or devices used to protect occupants from harsh daylight (e.g. glare) or for reasons of visual privacy. Environmental criteria serve as important criteria to gauge the quality of window view content. These criteria can be distilled into five important factors, namely: Location, time, weather, people, and nature. Notably, views that are able to provide building inhabitants with content of nature far outweigh the other four Environmental Information Criteria.

Different types and grades of glass and different window treatments can also affect the amount of light transmission through the windows. The type of glazing is an important issue, expressed by its VT coefficient (Visual Transmittance), also known as visual light transmittance (VLT). As the name suggests, this coefficient measures how much visible light is admitted by the window. A low VT (below 0.4) can reduce by half or more the light coming into a room. But be also aware of high VT glass: high VT numbers (say, above 0.60) can be a cause of glare. On the other hand, you should also take into account the undesirable effects of large windows.

Windows grade into translucent walls (below).

==== Clerestory windows ====
Another important element in creating daylighting is the use of clerestory windows. These are high, vertically placed windows. They can be used to increase direct solar gain when oriented towards the equator. When facing toward the sun, clerestories and other windows may admit unacceptable glare. In the case of a passive solar house, clerestories may provide a direct light path to polar-side (north in the northern hemisphere; south in the southern hemisphere) rooms that otherwise would not be illuminated. Alternatively, clerestories can be used to admit diffuse daylight (from the north in the northern hemisphere) that evenly illuminates a space such as a classroom or office.

Often, clerestory windows also shine onto interior wall surfaces painted white or another light color. These walls are placed so as to reflect indirect light to interior areas where it is needed. This method has the advantage of reducing the directionality of light to make it softer and more diffuse, reducing shadows.

==== Sawtooth roof ====
Another roof-angled glass alternative is a sawtooth roof (found on older factories). Sawtooth roofs have vertical roof glass facing away from the equator side of the building to capture diffused light (not harsh direct equator-side solar gain). The angled portion of the glass-support structure is opaque and well insulated with a cool roof and radiant barrier. The sawtooth roof's lighting concept partially reduces the summer "solar furnace" skylight problem, but still allows warm interior air to rise and touch the exterior roof glass in the cold winter, with significant undesirable heat transfer.

=== Skylights ===
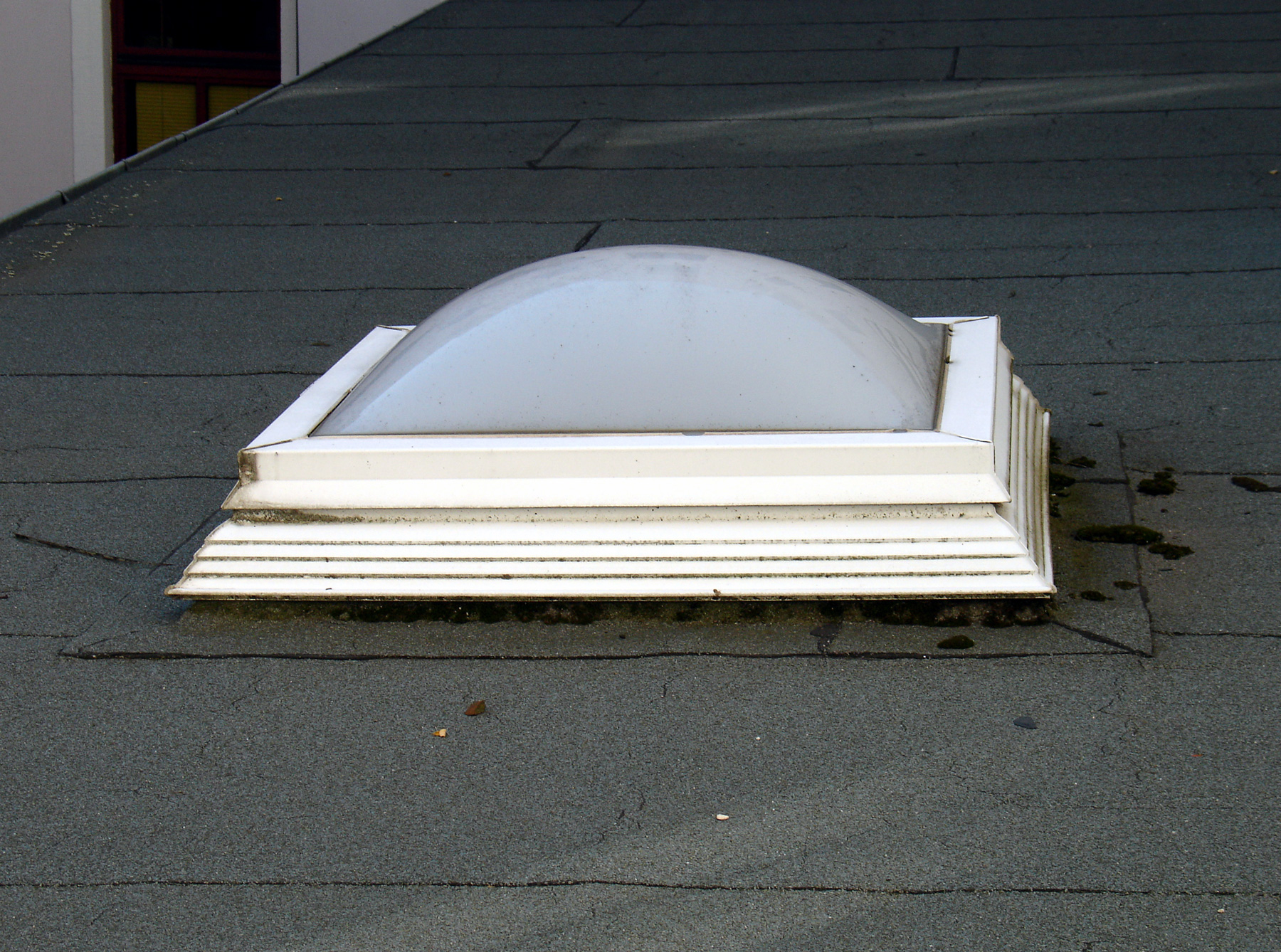
Modern skylight

A skylight or rooflight is a light-permitting structure or window, usually of transparent or translucent glass, that forms part (or all) of the roof area of a building for daylighting or ventilation.

=== Laylights ===
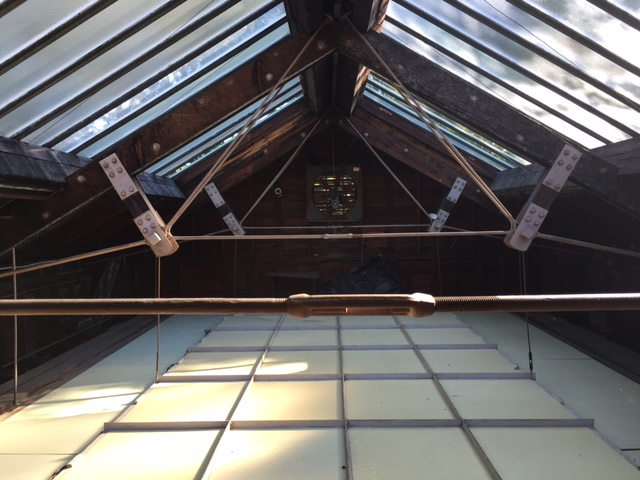
Skylights above laylights at the Lyme Art Association Gallery

As an element of architecture, a laylight is a glazed panel usually set flush with the ceiling for the purpose of admitting natural or artificial light. Laylights typically utilize stained glass or lenses in their glazing, but can also use alternative materials. For example, the Lyme Art Association Gallery utilizes translucent white muslin laylights below its skylights. A laylight differs from a glazed (or closed) skylight in that a skylight functions as a roof window or aperture, while a laylight is flush with the ceiling of an interior space. When paired with a roof lantern or skylight on a sloped roof, a laylight functions as an interior light diffuser. Before the advent of electric lighting, laylights allowed transmission of light between floors in larger buildings, and were not always paired with skylights.

=== Atrium ===
An atrium is a large open space located within a building. It is often used to light a central circulation or public area by daylight admitted through a glass roof or wall. Atria provide some daylight to adjacent working areas, but the amount is often small and does not penetrate very far. The main function of an atrium is to provide a visual experience and a degree of contact with the outside for people in the working areas. The daylighting of successive storeys of rooms adjoining an atrium is interdependent and requires a balanced approach. Light from the sky can easily penetrate the upper storeys but not the lower, which rely primarily on light reflected from internal surfaces of the atrium such as floor-reflected light. The upper stories need less window area than the lower ones, and if the atrium walls are light in color the upper walls will reflect light toward the lower stories.

=== Translucent walls ===
Glass brick wall, outdoors

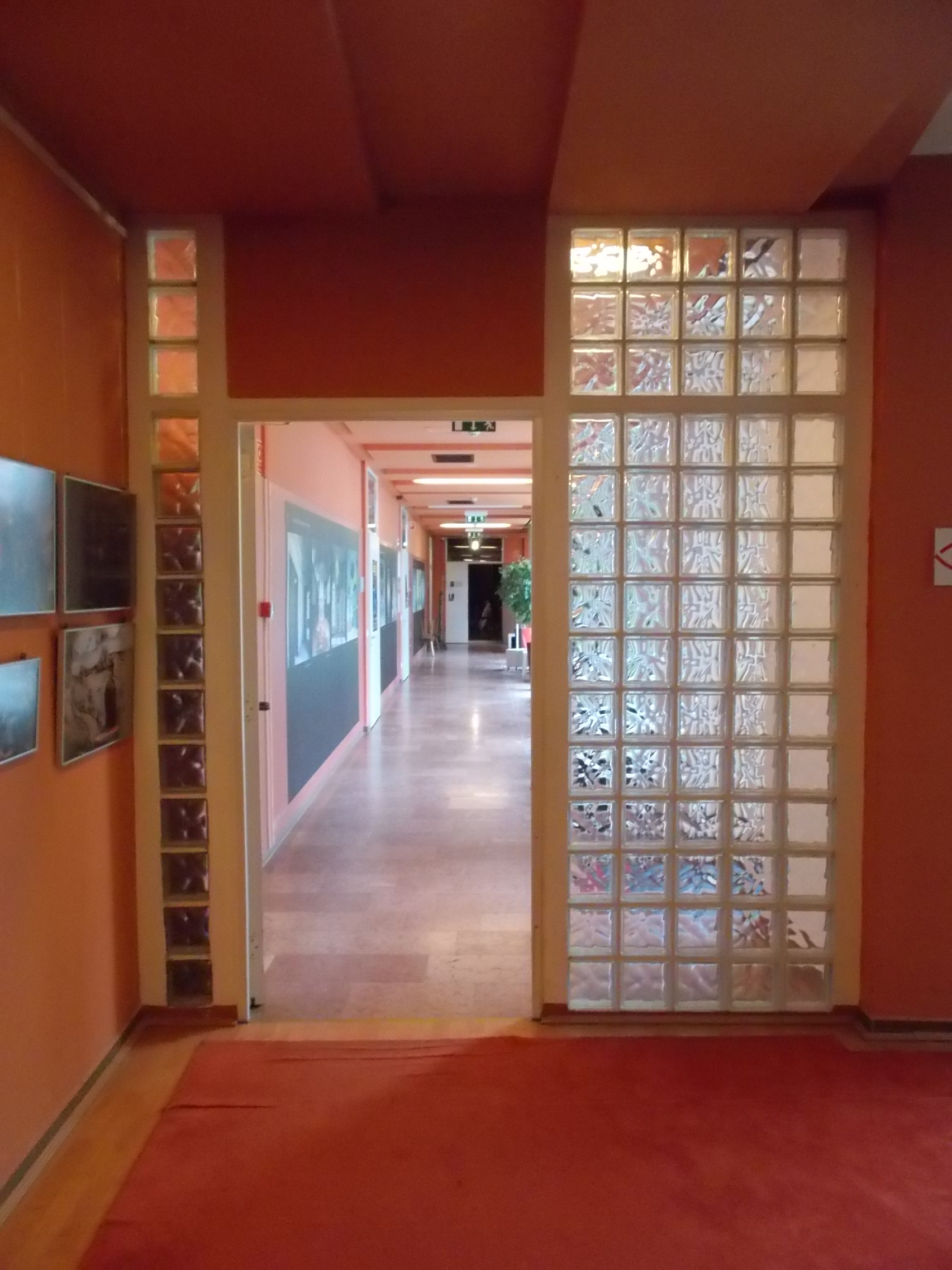
Glass brick wall, indoors

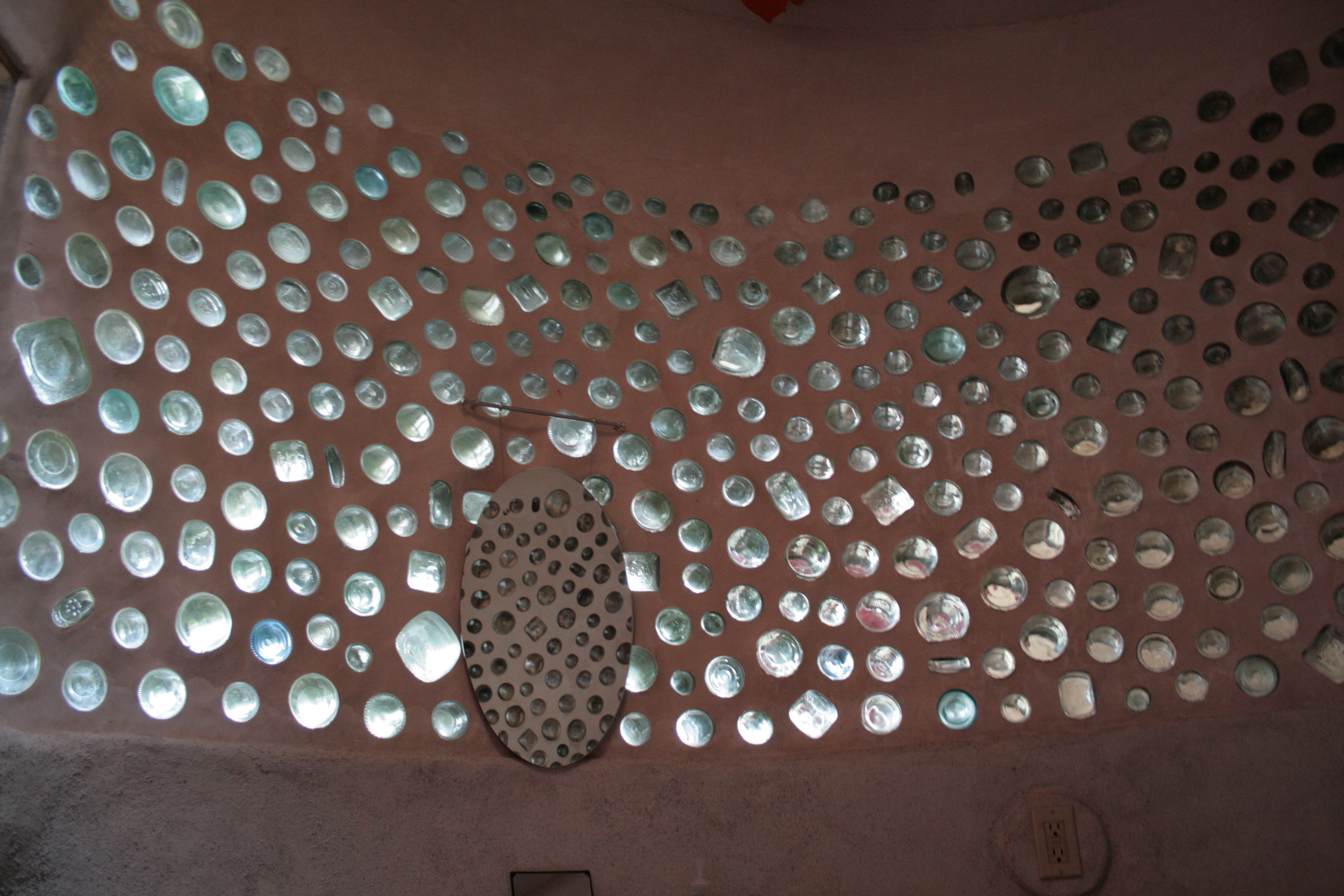
Bottle wall

Walls made of glass brick are translucent-to-transparent. Traditionally they are hollow and grouted with a fine concrete grout, but some modern glass brick walls are solid cast glass grouted with a transparent glue. If the glue matches the refractive index of the glass, the wall can be fairly transparent.

Increasing the amount of concrete, bottle walls embed bottles that run right through the wall, transmitting light. Concrete walls with glass prisms running through them have also been made. With the advent of cheaper optical fibers and fiber-optic concrete walls, daylight (and shadow images) can then pass directly through a solid concrete wall, making it translucent; fiber optics will lead light around bends and over tens of meters. Typically only a few percent of the light is transmitted (the percent transmittance is about half the percent of the surface that is fibers, and usually only ~5% fibers are used).

Both glass and concrete conduct heat fairly well, when solid, so none of these walls insulate well. They are therefore often used outdoors, as a divider between two heated spaces (see images), or in very temperate climates.

Greenhouse walls (and roofs) are made to transmit as much light and as little heat as possible. They use a variety of materials, and may be transparent or translucent.

=== Remote distribution ===
It is possible to provide some daylight into spaces that have low possibility of windows or skylights through remote distribution devices such as mirrors, prisms, or light tubes. This is called anidolic lighting, from anidolic (non-image-forming) optics. The non-linear response of the human eye to light means that spreading light to a broader area of a room makes the room appear brighter, and makes more of it usefully lit.

Remote daylight distribution systems have losses, and the further they have to transmit the daylight and the more convoluted the path, the greater the inefficiency. The efficiency of many remote distribution systems can also vary dramatically from clear to overcast skies. Nonetheless, where there is no other possibility of providing daylight to a space, remote distribution systems can be appreciated.

==== Light reflectors and shelves ====
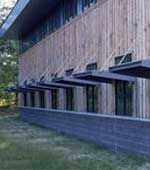
Light shelves

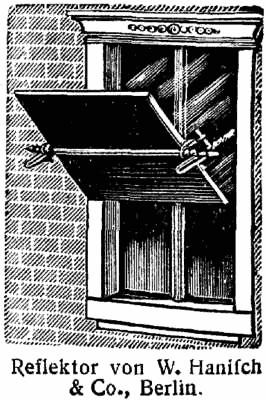
A light reflector

Once used extensively in office buildings, the manually adjustable light reflector is seldom in use today having been supplanted by a combination of other methods in concert with artificial illumination. The reflector had found favor where the choices of artificial light provided poor illumination compared to modern electric lighting.

Light shelves are an effective way to enhance the lighting from windows on the equator-facing side of a structure, this effect being obtained by placing a white or reflective metal light shelf outside the window. Usually the window will be protected from direct summer season sun by a projecting eave. The light shelf projects beyond the shadow created by the eave and reflects sunlight upward to illuminate the ceiling. This reflected light can contain little heat content and the reflective illumination from the ceiling will typically reduce deep shadows, reducing the need for general illumination.

In the cold winter, a natural light shelf is created when there is snow on the ground which makes it reflective. Low winter sun (see Sun path) reflects off the snow and increases solar gain through equator-facing glass by one- to two-thirds which brightly lights the ceiling of these rooms. Glare control (drapes) may be required.

==== Prisms ====
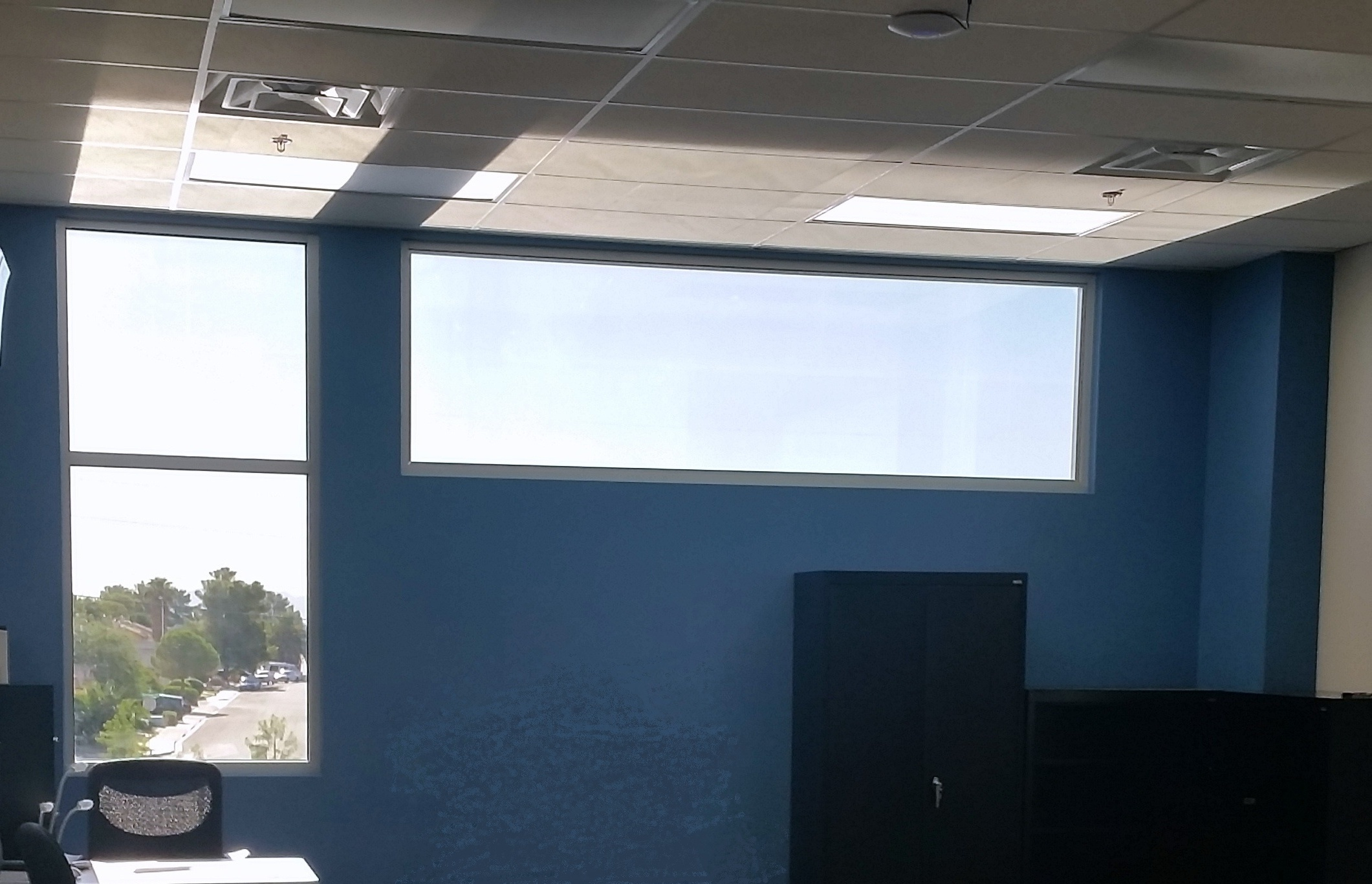
Daylight redirecting film bending light upwards

The oldest use of prisms for daylighting may well be deck prisms, let into the decks of ships to transmit light below. Later, pavement lights or vault lights were used to light basement areas under sidewalks.

Prisms that used total internal reflection to throw light sideways, lighting the deeper portions of a room, later became popular. Early thick, slow-cooling cast glass prism tiles were often known as "luxfer tiles" after a major manufacturer. They were and are used in the upper portions of windows, and some believe that they contributed to the trend from dark, subdivided Victorian interiors to open-plan, light-coloured ones.

Daylight redirecting window film (DRF) is a thin plastic version of the old glass prism tiles. It can be used as a substitute for opaque blinds.

==== Light tubes ====
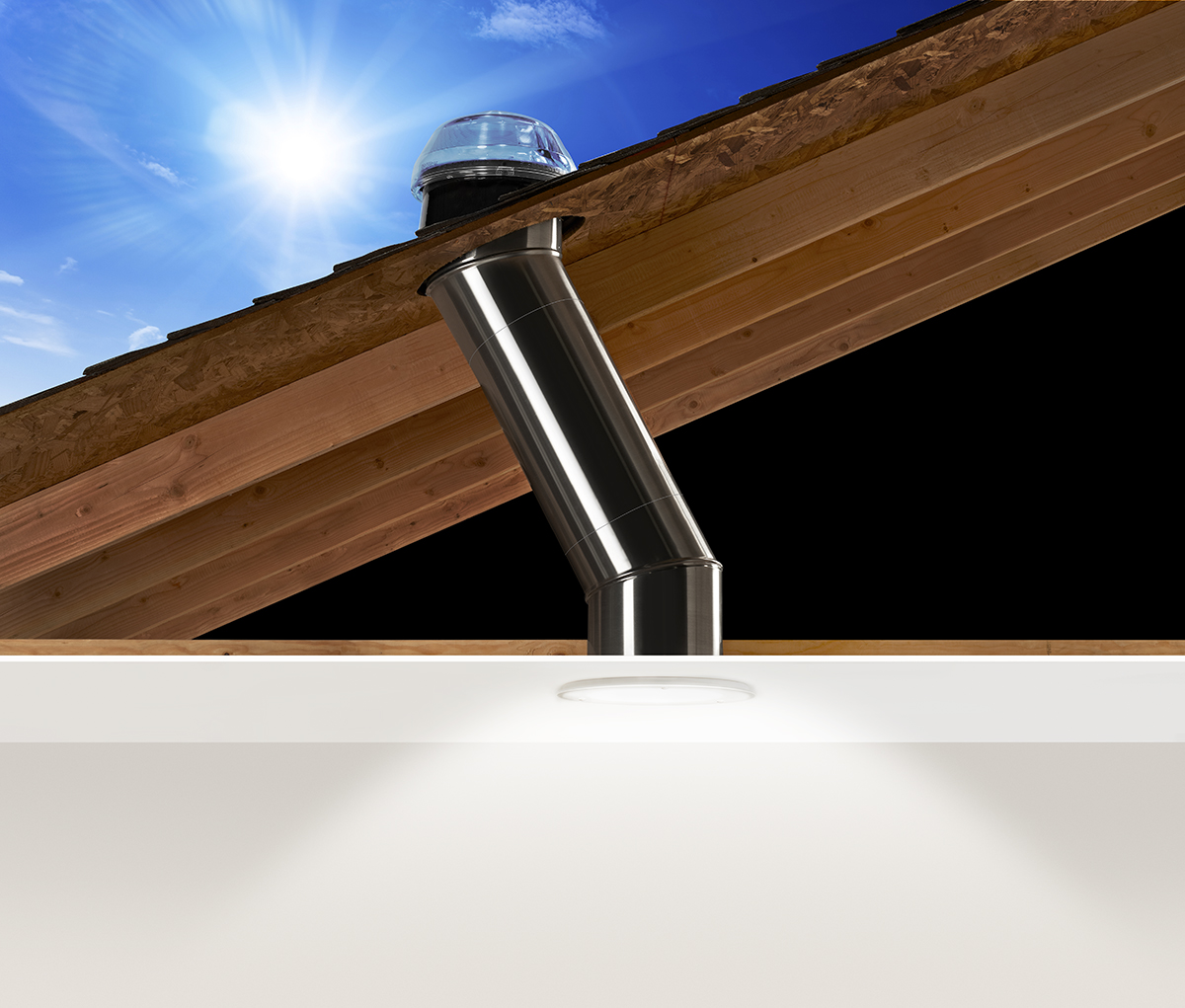
Tubular daylighting devices harvest sunlight and transmit it through a highly reflective tube into an interior space at the ceiling level

Diagram of a light tube

Another type of device used is the light tube, also called a tubular daylighting device (TDD), which is placed into a roof and admits light to a focused area of the interior. These somewhat resemble recessed ceiling light fixtures. They do not allow as much heat transfer as skylights because they have less surface area.

TDDs use modern technology to transmit visible light through opaque walls and roofs. The tube itself is a passive component consisting of either a simple reflective interior coating or a light conducting fiber optic bundle. It is frequently capped with a transparent, roof-mounted dome "light collector" and terminated with a diffuser assembly that admits the daylight into interior spaces and distributes the available light energy evenly (or else efficiently if the use of the lit space is reasonably fixed, and the user desired one or more "bright-spots").

The tubular daylighting device was invented by Solatube International in 1986 and brought to market first in Australia in 1991.

=== Active daylighting ===
Active daylighting is a system of collecting sunlight using a mechanical device to increase the efficiency of light collection for a given lighting purpose. Active daylighting systems are different from passive daylighting systems in that passive systems are stationary and do not actively follow or track the sun. There are two types of active daylighting control systems: closed loop solar tracking, and open loop solar tracking systems.

- Closed loop systems track the sun by relying on a set of lens or sensors with a limited field of view, directed at the sun, and are fully illuminated by sunlight at all times. As the sun moves, it begins to shade one or more sensors, which the system detect and activates motors or actuators to move the device back into a position where all sensors are once again equally illuminated.
- Open loop systems track the sun without physically following the sun via sensors (although sensors may be used for calibration). These systems typically employ electronic logic which controls device motors or actuators to follow the sun based on a mathematical formula. This formula is typically a pre-programmed sun path chart, detailing where the sun will be at a given latitude and at a given date and time for each day.

== Smart glass ==
Smart glass is the name given to a class of materials and devices that can be switched between a transparent state and a state which is opaque, translucent, reflective, or retro-reflective. The switching is done by applying a voltage to the material, or by performing some simple mechanical operation. Windows, skylights, etc., that are made of smart glass can be used to adjust indoor lighting, compensating for changes of the brightness of the light outdoors and of the required brightness indoors.

== Solar lighting ==
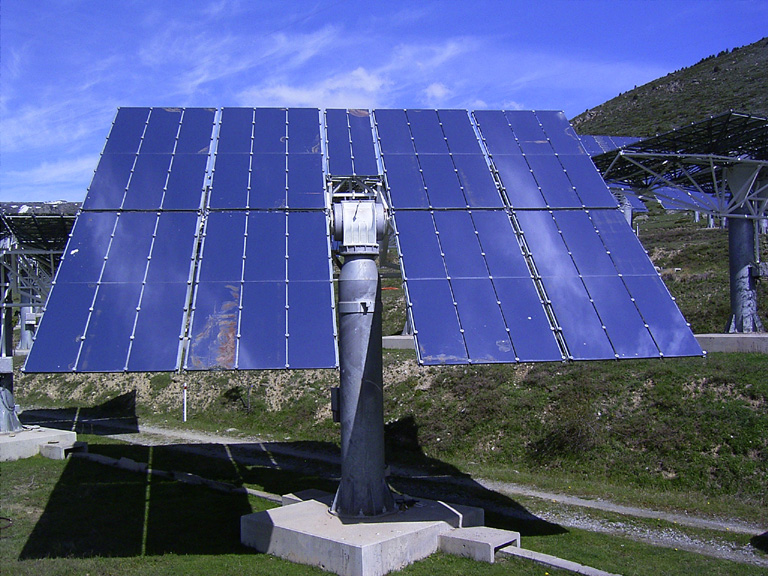
The reflecting mirror of a heliostat

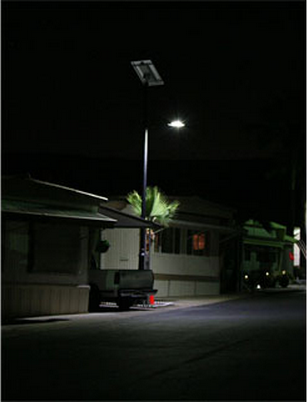
A solar street light

=== Heliostats ===
The use of heliostats, mirrors which are moved automatically to reflect sunlight in a constant direction as the sun moves across the sky, is gaining popularity as an energy-efficient method of lighting. A heliostat can be used to shine sunlight directly through a window or skylight, or into any arrangement of optical elements, such as light tubes, that distribute the light where it is needed. The image shows a mirror that rotates on a computer-controlled, motor-driven altazimuth mount.

=== Solar street lights ===
Solar street lights raised light sources which are powered by photovoltaic panels generally mounted on the lighting structure. The solar array of such off-grid PV system charges a rechargeable battery, which powers a fluorescent or LED lamp during the night. Solar street lights are stand-alone power systems, and have the advantage of savings on trenching, landscaping, and maintenance costs, as well as on the electric bills, despite their higher initial cost compared to conventional street lighting. They are designed with sufficiently large batteries to ensure operation for at least a week and even in the worst situation, they are expected to dim only slightly.

=== Hybrid solar lighting ===
Oak Ridge National Laboratory (ORNL) has developed a new alternative to skylights called hybrid solar lighting. This design uses a roof-mounted light collector, large-diameter optical fiber, and modified efficient fluorescent lighting fixtures that have transparent rods connected to the optical fiber cables. Essentially no electricity is needed for daytime natural interior lighting.

Field tests conducted in 2006 and 2007 of the new HSL technology were promising, but the low-volume equipment production is still expensive. HSL should become more cost effective in the near future. A version that can withstand windstorms could begin to replace conventional commercial fluorescent lighting systems with improved implementations in 2008 and beyond. The U.S. 2007 Energy Bill provides funding for HSL R&D, and multiple large commercial buildings are ready to fund further HSL application development and deployment.

At night, ORNL HSL uses variable-intensity fluorescent lighting electronic control ballasts. As the sunlight gradually decreases at sunset, the fluorescent fixture is gradually turned up to give a near-constant level of interior lighting from daylight until after it becomes dark outside.

HSL may soon become an option for commercial interior lighting. It can transmit about half of the direct sunlight it receives.

== Solarium ==
In a well-designed isolated solar gain building with a solarium, sunroom, greenhouse, etc., there is usually significant glass on the equator side. A large area of glass can also be added between the sun room and the interior living quarters. Low-cost, high-volume-produced patio door safety glass is an inexpensive way to accomplish this goal.

The doors used to enter a room should be opposite the sun room interior glass, so that a user can see outside immediately when entering most rooms. Halls should be minimized with open spaces used instead. If a hall is necessary for privacy or room isolation, inexpensive patio door safety glass can be placed on both sides of the hall. Drapes over the interior glass can be used to control lighting. Drapes can optionally be automated with sensor-based electric motor controls that are aware of room occupancy, daylight, interior temperature, and time of day. Passive solar buildings with no central air conditioning system need control mechanisms for hourly, daily, and seasonal, temperature-and-daylight variations. If the temperature is correct, and a room is unoccupied, the drapes can automatically close to reduce heat transfer in either direction.

To help distribute sun room daylight to the sides of rooms that are farthest from the equator, inexpensive ceiling-to-floor mirrors can be used.

Building codes require a second means of egress, in case of fire. Most designers use a door on one side of bedrooms, and an outside window, but west-side windows provide very-poor summer thermal performance. Instead of a west-facing window, designers use an R-13 foam-filled solid energy-efficient exterior door. It may have a glass storm door on the outside so that light can pass through when the inner door is opened. East/west glass doors and windows should be fully shaded top-to-bottom or a spectrally selective coating can be used to reduce solar gain.

== Design ==
Architects and interior designers often use daylighting as a design element. Good daylighting requires attention to both qualitative and quantitative aspects of design.

=== Qualitative ===
Utilizing natural light is one of the design aspects in architecture; In 1929, the French architect, Le Corbusier said that "The history of architectural material... has been the endless struggle for light... in other words, the history of windows." As he emphasized in his architecture (such as Notre Dame du Haut), daylighting has been a major architectural design element (See MIT Chapel and Church of the Light for examples). Not only the aesthetic aspects, the impact of daylighting on human health and work performance is also considered as qualitative daylighting. The current studies show that lighting conditions in workplaces contribute to a variety of factors related to work satisfaction, productivity and well-being and significantly higher visual acceptance scores under daylighting than electrical lighting. Studies have also shown that light has a direct effect on human health because of the way it influences the circadian rhythms.

=== Quantitative ===
A well daylit space needs both adequate lighting levels and light that is well distributed. In the current building industry, daylighting is considered a building performance measure in green building certification programs such as LEED. Illuminating Engineering Society (IES) and the society of Light and Lighting (SLL) provide illuminance recommendation for each space type. How much daylighting contributes to the recommended lighting level determines daylighting performance of a building. There are two metrics that IES has approved to evaluate daylighting performance: Spatial Daylight Autonomy(sDA) and Annual Sunlight Exposure (ASE). sDA is a metric describing annual sufficiency of ambient daylight levels in interior environments. See Daylight autonomy and LEED documentation sections for more details.

== Evaluation method ==
=== Field measurements ===
In existing buildings, field measurements can be undertaken to evaluate daylighting performance. Illuminance measurements on a grid is a basic level to derive an average illuminance of a space. The spacing of the measurement points vary with project purposes. The height of these points depends on where the primary task is performed. In most office spaces, desk level (0.762m above the floor) will be measured. Based on measurements, average illuminance, maximum-to-minimum uniformity ratio, and average-to-minimum uniformity ratio will be calculated and compared to the recommended lighting level. A diagnostic survey specific to lighting can be conducted to analyse the satisfaction of building occupants.

=== Computational simulations ===
Computational simulations can predict daylighting condition of a space much faster and more detailed than hand calculations or scale model testing. The simulations allow for the effects of climate with hourly weather data from typical meteorological year. Computer models are available which can predict variations in internally reflected light. Radiosity and ray-tracing are methods can deal with complex geometry, allow complex sky distributions and potentially produce photorealistic images. Radiosity methods assume all surfaces are perfectly diffusing to reduce computational times. Ray-tracing techniques have accuracy and image rendering capacity.

== Daylighting metrics and analyses ==
Diagram illustrating calculation of daylight factor.

Daylight autonomy is the percentage of time that daylight levels are above a specified target illuminance within a physical space or building. The calculation is based on annual data and the predetermined lighting levels. The goal of the calculation is to determine how long an individual can work in a space without requiring electrical lighting, while also providing optimal visual and physical comfort.

Daylight autonomy is beneficial when determining how daylight enters and illuminates a space. The drawback, however, is that there is no upper limit on luminance levels. Therefore, a space with a high internal heat gain deemed uncomfortable by occupants, would still perform well in the analysis. Achieving daylight autonomy requires an integrated design approach that guides the building form, siting, climate considerations, building components, lighting controls, and lighting design criteria.

=== Continuous ===
Continuous daylight autonomy, is similar to daylight autonomy but partial credit is attributed to time steps when the daylight illuminance lies below the minimum illuminance level. For example, if the target illuminance is 400 lux and the calculated value is 200 lux, daylight autonomy would give zero credit, while continuous daylight autonomy would give 0.5 credit (200/400=0.5). The benefit of continuous daylight autonomy is that it does not give a hard threshold of acceptable illuminance. Instead, it addresses the transition area—allowing for realistic preferences within any given space. For example, office occupants usually prefer to work at daylight below the illuminance threshold since this level avoids potential glare and excessive contrast.

=== Useful illuminance ===
Useful daylight illuminance focuses on the direct sunlight that falls into a space. The useful daylight illuminance calculation is based on three factors—the percentage of time a point is below, between, or above an illuminance value. The range for these factors is typically 100–2,000 lux. Useful daylight illuminance is similar to daylight autonomy but has the added benefit of addressing glare and thermal discomfort. The upper threshold is used to determine when glare or thermal discomfort is occurring and may need resolution.

=== Illuminance distribution ===
Besides determining how much illuminance is received on a horizontal surface, a method that analyses annual illuminance distributions for daylight has been developed. Every annual illuminance distribution is compared against each other using principal components analysis. This compares the relationship between each pattern. Daylight patterns that are more similar to each other due to architectural features and the time of the year the illuminance are produced are grouped together. Groups are used to form the most representative patterns for that given building. This method can be used to easily interpret how daylight is spread across the space throughout the entire year in any building.

== LEED documentation ==
The LEED 2009 daylighting standards were intended to connect building occupants with the outdoors through use of optimal daylighting techniques and technologies. According to these standards, the maximum value of 1 point can be achieved through four different approaches. The first approach is a computer simulation to demonstrate, in clear sky conditions, the daylight illuminance levels 108–5,400 lux on, September 21 between 9:00 a.m. and 3:00 p.m. Another prescriptive approach is a method that uses two types of side-lighting, and three types of top-lighting to determine if a minimum of 75% daylighting is achieved in the occupied spaces. A third approach uses indoor light measurements showing that between 108 and 5,400 lux have been achieved in the space. The last approach is a combination of the other three calculation methods to prove that the daylight illumination requirements are achieved.

The LEED 2009 documentation is based upon the daylight factor calculation. The daylight factor calculation is based on uniform overcast skies. It is most applicable in Northern Europe and parts of North America. Daylight factor is "the ratio of the illuminance at a point on a plane, generally the horizontal work plane, produced by the luminous flux received directly or indirectly at that point from a sky whose luminance distribution is known, to the illuminance on a horizontal plane produced by an unobstructed hemisphere of this same sky."

LEED v4 daylighting standards are the most current as of 2014. The new standards are similar to the old standards, but also intend to "reinforce circadian rhythms, and reduce the use of electrical lighting by introducing daylight in the space. Two options exist for achieving the maximum value of these two most recent points. One option is to use a computer simulation to demonstrate that a spatial daylight autonomy of 300 lux for at least 50% of the time, and an annual sunlight exposure of 1,000 lux for 250 occupied hours per year, exists in the space. Another option is to show that illuminance levels are between 300 lux and 3,000 lux between 9:00 a.m. and 3:00 p.m. on a clear day at the equinox for 75% or 90% of the floor area in the space. The overall goal of the LEED v4 daylighting metrics is to analyze both the quantity and quality of the light, as well as to balance the use of glazing to ensure more light and less cooling load.

== See also ==
- Architectural glass
- Circadian rhythm
- Daylight
- Daylight harvesting
- Daylight factor
- Deck prism
- Glass brick
- Healthy building
- Heliostat
- Low-energy house
- Passive daylighting
- Passive house
- Passive solar
  - Passive solar building design
- Solar access
- Solar tracker
- Skylight
- Sun path
- Sustainability
  - Sustainable architecture
- Transom (architectural)
- Nonimaging optics
