= Arginine N-succinyltransferase =

Identifiers
- EC no.: 2.3.1.109
- CAS no.: 99676-48-9

Databases
- IntEnz: IntEnz view
- BRENDA: BRENDA entry
- ExPASy: NiceZyme view
- KEGG: KEGG entry
- MetaCyc: metabolic pathway
- PRIAM: profile
- PDB structures: RCSB PDB PDBe PDBsum
- Gene Ontology: AmiGO / QuickGO
Search
- PMC: articles
- PubMed: articles
- NCBI: proteins

Arginine N-succinyltransferase (EC 2.3.1.109) is an enzyme that catalyzes the chemical reaction

arginine
+
succinyl-CoA
N(2)-succinyl-L-arginine
+ coenzyme A

The two substrates of this enzyme are arginine and succinyl-CoA. Its products are N(2)-succinyl-L-arginine and coenzyme A. In this pathway, arginine is converted into breakdown products including ammonia, which is required for other processes in the bacteria. The enzyme can also use ornithine as substrate and is involved in its catabolism in Pseudomonas aeruginosa.

This enzyme belongs to the family of transferases, specifically those acyltransferases transferring groups other than aminoacyl groups. The systematic name of this enzyme class is succinyl-CoA:L-arginine N2-succinyltransferase. Other names in common use include arginine succinyltransferase, AstA, arginine and ornithine N2-succinyltransferase, AOST, AST, and succinyl-CoA:L-arginine 2-N-succinyltransferase. This enzyme participates in arginine and proline metabolism.

== Structural studies ==
As of late 2007, only one structure has been solved for this class of enzymes, with the PDB accession code 1YLE.
