= Visual privacy =

Collection and dissemination of visual information and the expectation of privacy

Visual privacy describes the relationship between collection and dissemination of visual information, the expectation of privacy, and the legal issues surrounding them. These days cameras are ubiquitous. They are found in billions of electronic devices, ranging from smartphones to tablets, and laptops to surveillance cams in homes, business, and public.

== Applications ==
=== Surveillance ===
However, privacy and trust implications surrounding it limit its ability to seamlessly blend into the computing environment. It is estimated that over 7 million CCTV cameras were deployed in the UK as of 2022. Camera networks have proliferated across other countries. Tools for controlling how these camera networks are used and modifications to the images and video sent to end-users have been explored.

=== Homes ===
At home, visual privacy is involved in protecting private spaces, in shared spaces, and protecting occupants from unwanted outsiders. It may also be a concern between residences without adequate screening.

== Technologies enhancing visual privacy ==
Different technologies can preserve privacy while providing information from surveillance networks. Most of these solutions rely upon the target application to operate in a privacy-preserving manner:

- "Respectful Cameras" automatically obscure the faces of observed people.
- Google Streetview uses automatic face detection to blur faces.
- Eptascape has a product that provides privacy-enabled surveillance.
- Cardea is a context-aware visual privacy protection mechanism that protects bystanders' visual privacy in photos according to their context-dependent privacy preferences.
- Thermal and depth cameras are used in person detection and people counting.
- Privacy-preserving lens design consists of the joint optimization of optics and algorithms to perform vision tasks like human pose estimation and action recognition.
- Edge computing: various applications enhance user privacy by keeping visual and other data on personal devices rather than sending to a server for processing. The latter increases the "surface", creating more chances for allowing others access to sensitive private data by service providers and/or malware.

== See also ==
- Mass surveillance
