= Daylight =

Natural light during the daytime

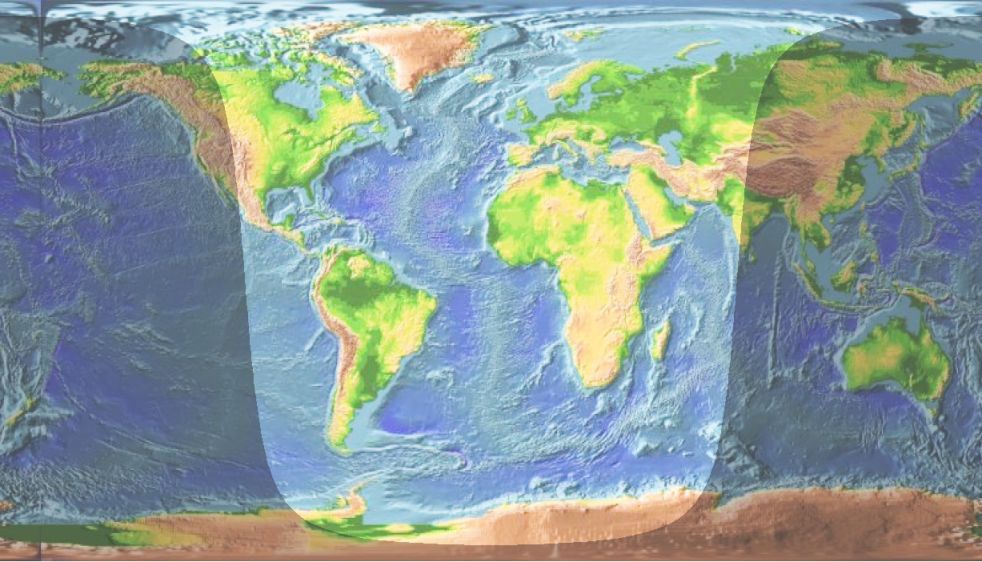
World map showing the areas of Earth receiving daylight around 1:00 pm UTC in April

Daylight is the combination of all direct and indirect sunlight during the daytime. This includes direct sunlight, diffuse sky radiation, and (often) both of these reflected by Earth and terrestrial objects, like landforms and buildings. Sunlight scattered or reflected by astronomical objects is generally not considered daylight. Therefore, daylight excludes moonlight, despite it being reflected indirect sunlight.

== Definition ==
Daylight is present at a particular location, to some degree, whenever the Sun is above the local horizon. This is true for slightly more than 50% of the Earth at any given time, since the Earth's atmosphere refracts some sunlight even when the Sun is below the horizon.

Outdoor illuminance varies from 120,000 lux for direct sunlight at noon, which may cause eye pain, to less than 5 lux for thick storm clouds with the Sun at the horizon (even <1 lux for the most extreme case), which may make shadows from distant street lights visible. It may be darker under unusual circumstances like a solar eclipse or very high levels of atmospheric particulates, which include smoke (see New England's Dark Day), dust, and volcanic ash.

== Intensity in different conditions ==
Illuminance	Example
120,000 lux	Brightest sunlight
111,000 lux	Bright sunlight
109,880 lux	AM 1.5 global solar spectrum sunlight (= 1,000.4 W/m^{2})
20,000 lux	Shade illuminated by entire clear blue sky, midday
1,000–2,000 lux	Typical overcast day, midday
400 lux	Sunrise or sunset on a clear day (ambient illumination)
<200 lux	Extreme of thickest storm clouds, midday
40 lux	Fully overcast, sunset/sunrise
<1 lux	Extreme of thickest storm clouds, sunset/rise

For comparison, nighttime illuminance levels are:

Illuminance	Example
<1 lux	Moonlight, clear night sky
0.25 lux	A full Moon, clear night sky
0.01 lux	A quarter Moon, clear night sky
0.002 lux	Starlight and airglow, clear moonless night sky
0.0002 lux	Starlight, clear moonless night sky, excluding airglow
0.00014 lux	Venus at brightest, clear night sky
0.0001 lux	Starlight, overcast moonless night sky

== See also ==
- Artificial sky
- Color temperature
- Daylight harvesting
- Daylight saving time
- Daylighting
- Daytime – Period of a day in which a location experiences natural illumination
- Moonlight
- Right to light
- Twilight
