= Stuttgart Technical University of Applied Sciences =

Public university in Baden-Württemberg, Germany

Stuttgart Technology University of Applied Sciences
- Hochschule für Technik Stuttgart
- Established: 1832; 194 years ago
- Principal: Katja Rade
- Students: 3.892 (Winter Semester 2019/2020)
- Location: Stuttgart, Baden-Württemberg, Germany; 48.780°N 9.173°E
- Website: www.hft-stuttgart.de

The Stuttgart Technical University of Applied Sciences (German: Hochschule für Technik Stuttgart, or in brief HFT Stuttgart) is one of ten institutes for higher education in Stuttgart. It was founded in 1832 as a school for construction craftsmen (Winterschule für Bauhandwerker) and was inaugurated as a University of Applied Sciences in 1971.

The campus is located in the downtown of Stuttgart.

== Faculties and programmes ==
There are three faculties offering the following bachelor´s and master´s degree programmes:

- Faculty of Architecture and Design:
  - Architecture (Bachelor and Master)
  - Interior Design (Bachelor)
  - Climate engineering (Bachelor)
  - International Project Management (Master)
  - International Master of Interior-Architectural Design (Master)
  - Urban Planning (Master)
- Faculty of Civil Engineering, Building Physics and Business Management
  - Building Physics (Bachelor)
  - Building Physics and Business Management (Bachelor)
  - Business Management (Bachelor)
  - Business Psychology (Bachelor)
  - Civil Engineering (Bachelor)
  - Civil Engineering / Tunnel Building (Master)
  - Environmental Protection (Master)
  - General Management (Master)
  - Infrastructure Management (Bachelor)
  - Structural Engineering (Master)
  - Sustainable Energy Competence (Master)
- Faculty of Geomatics, Computer Science and Mathematics
  - Computer Science (Bachelor)
  - Information Logistics (Bachelor)
  - Business Information Systems (Bachelor)
  - Mathematics (Bachelor and Master)
  - Surveying and Geoinformatics (Bachelor)
  - Surveying (Master)
  - Software Technology (Master)
  - Photogrammetry and Geoinformatics (Master)

== Involvement ==
As part of the FH-Impuls project i_city, which is funded by the Federal Ministry of Education and Research (Germany), an explorative project on smart public buildings has been started in October 2017. As the project is based on openHAB, the HFT Stuttgart became a member of the openHAB foundation and also regularly hosts meetings and conferences about openHAB and related smart home topics.
