= Bullseye (target) =

Center of a target

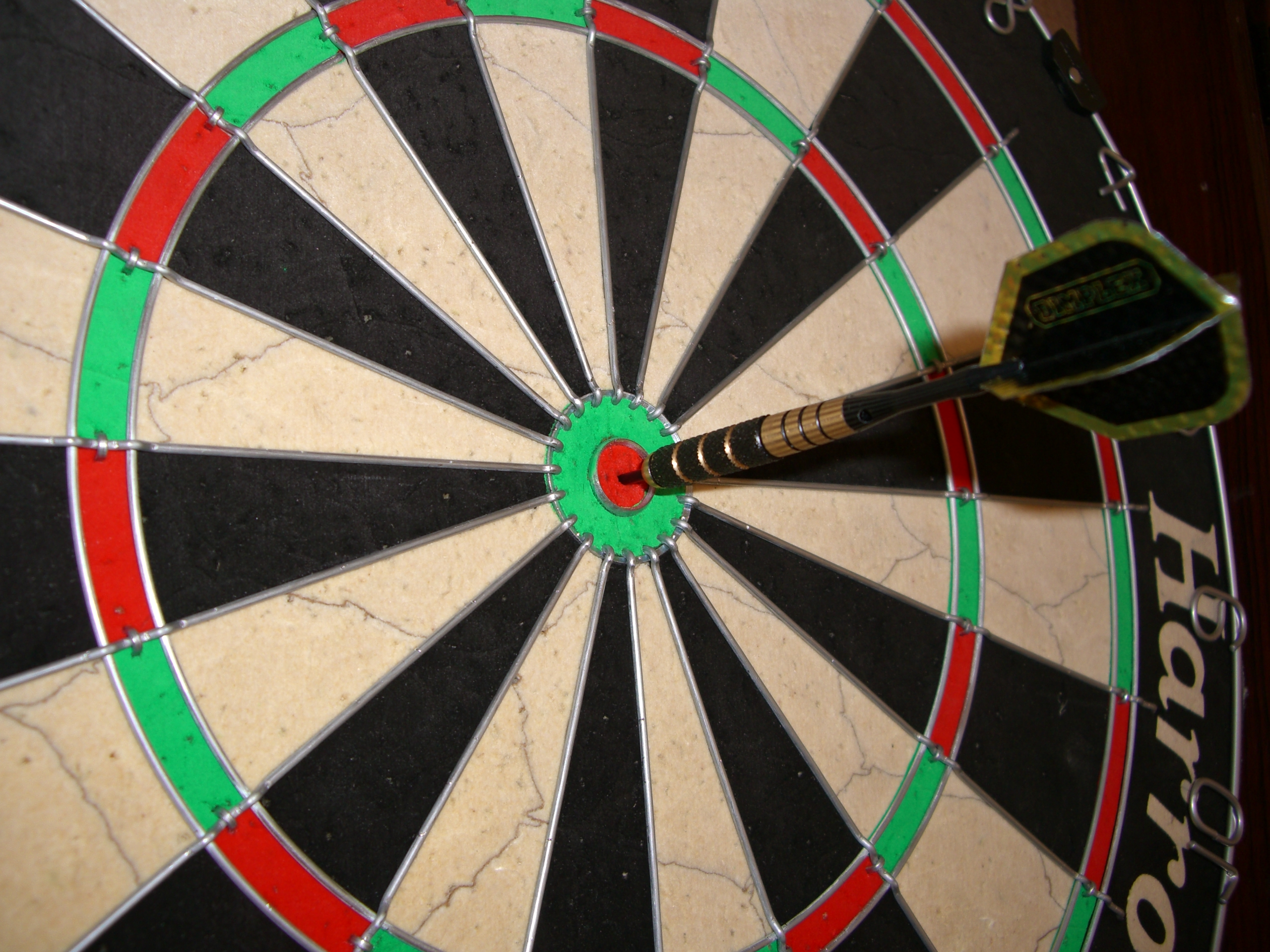
A dart in the inner bullseye

The "gold" is the yellow circle at the centre of this archery target.

The bullseye or bull's eye is the center of a shooting target or dartboard. The term has been used as such since at least 1833. Since 1857, the term has been used to refer to any throw, toss, or shot that hits the center. Striking the bullseye of a target rewards the highest score or esteem in many games and competitions, such as in target archery and bullseye shooting.

== Etymology ==
The term "bullseye" had been used since the Middle Ages to describe a hole, in particular where the breadth and thickness of the object was much larger than the hole. In this sense, it was commonly used to describe the pontil mark on medieval crown-glass windows, where a blob (bullion, from the French boule) of molten glass was attached to a pole and spun rapidly to flatten it out into a large disk, from which windows were cut. The center was much thicker, with a small divot where the pole was attached, and this was referred to as the bullseye. The bullseye was too dense for making windows but often used for making crown-glass lenses or deck prisms in ships to let in light to the hold below deck, and these were also called bullseyes. By extension, police lanterns with lenses for focusing light into a spot became known as bullseyes. This thick glass was also called the crown, and the term bullseye became a slang term to refer to the British crown coin. Its use to describe the center of a target was first recorded in 1833, according to the Oxford English Dictionary, or possibly as early as 1813, according to other sources.

== Sports ==
=== Archery ===
In some archery traditions, the term "gold" is used in preference to "bullseye". In target archery, hitting the center ring of an international target is worth 10 points, or 9 points if it's an Imperial target.

=== Axe throwing ===
A bullseye at the Mid-Sierra Loggers Jamboree.

Scoring rules in competitive axe throwing vary between organizations such as the International Axe Throwing Federation and the World Axe Throwing League. In some loggersports competitions, a beer can serves as the bullseye. The can is shaken beforehand so that a direct strike makes it burst, visibly marking the hit.

=== Kyūdō ===
In Japanese archery, known as Kyūdō, the bullseye is called "zuboshi". The term is also used as idiomatic slang just as it is in English, to note that someone has done or said something that hits "right on the nose."

=== Darts ===
In darts, the bullseye is located 5 foot 8 inches (1.73m) above the floor. Before the start of a match, players will usually throw closest to the bullseye to decide who has the advantage of throwing first. An inner bullseye (sometimes called a "double bullseye" in amateur play) is a smaller inner circle and counts for 50 points, while an outer bull is worth 25 points. Unlike in other games, the bullseye is not the highest-scoring target in standard darts. This goes to the "triple 20" segment above it. In the World Grand Prix, which has a double start format, an inner bullseye can begin a leg. In the dart golf game, the bullseye is part of a three-part tiebreaker that includes the treble twenty.

Hitting three bullseyes in darts is known as the "Alan Evans shot".

== See also ==
- Bullseye (shooting competition)
- Roundel, a round shape in heraldry
- Bullseye, a British game show based on darts
- Porthole
