= Hatchet =

Single-handed striking tool

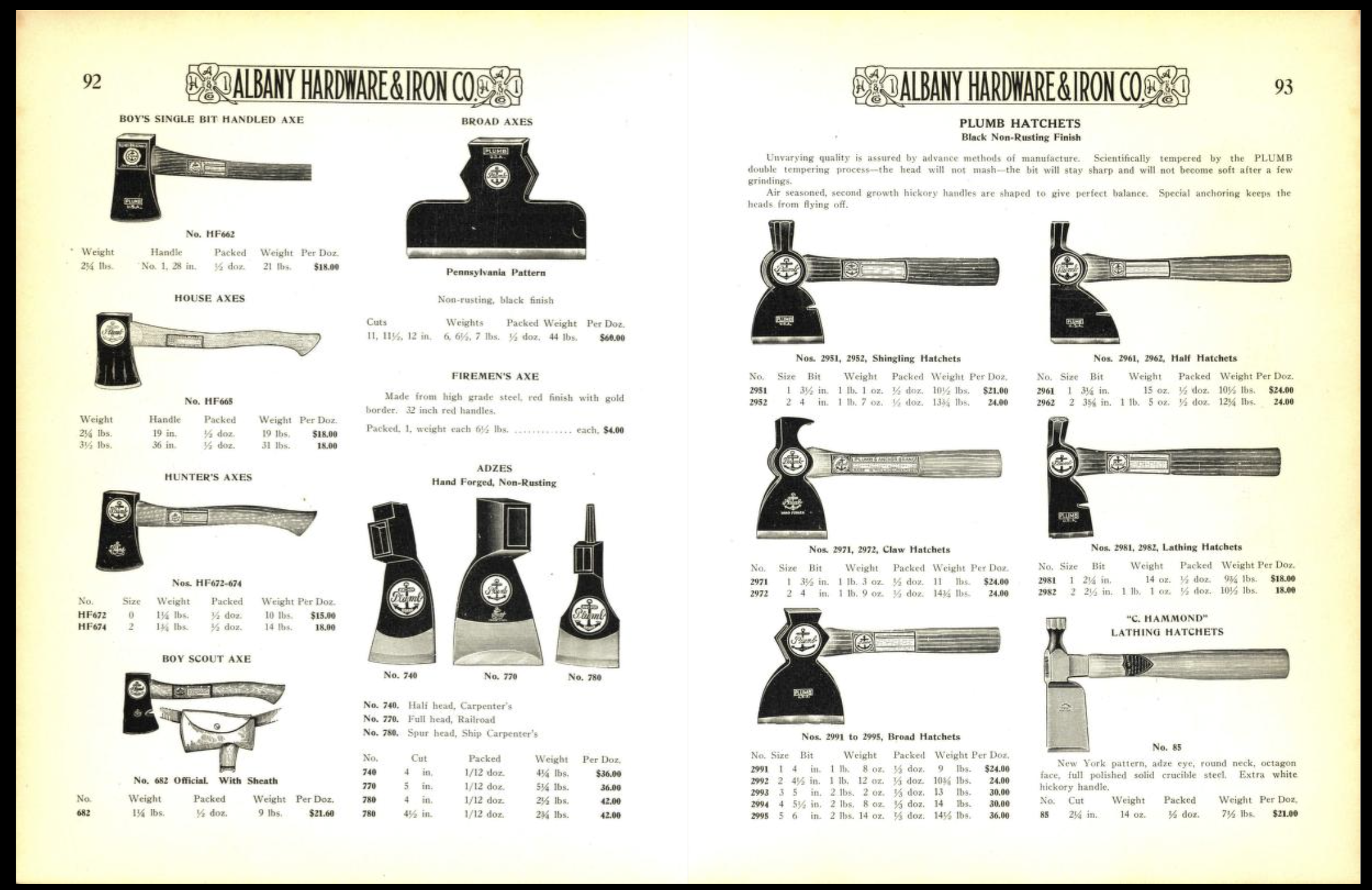
Retailer & manufacturer's distinction of axe and hatchet

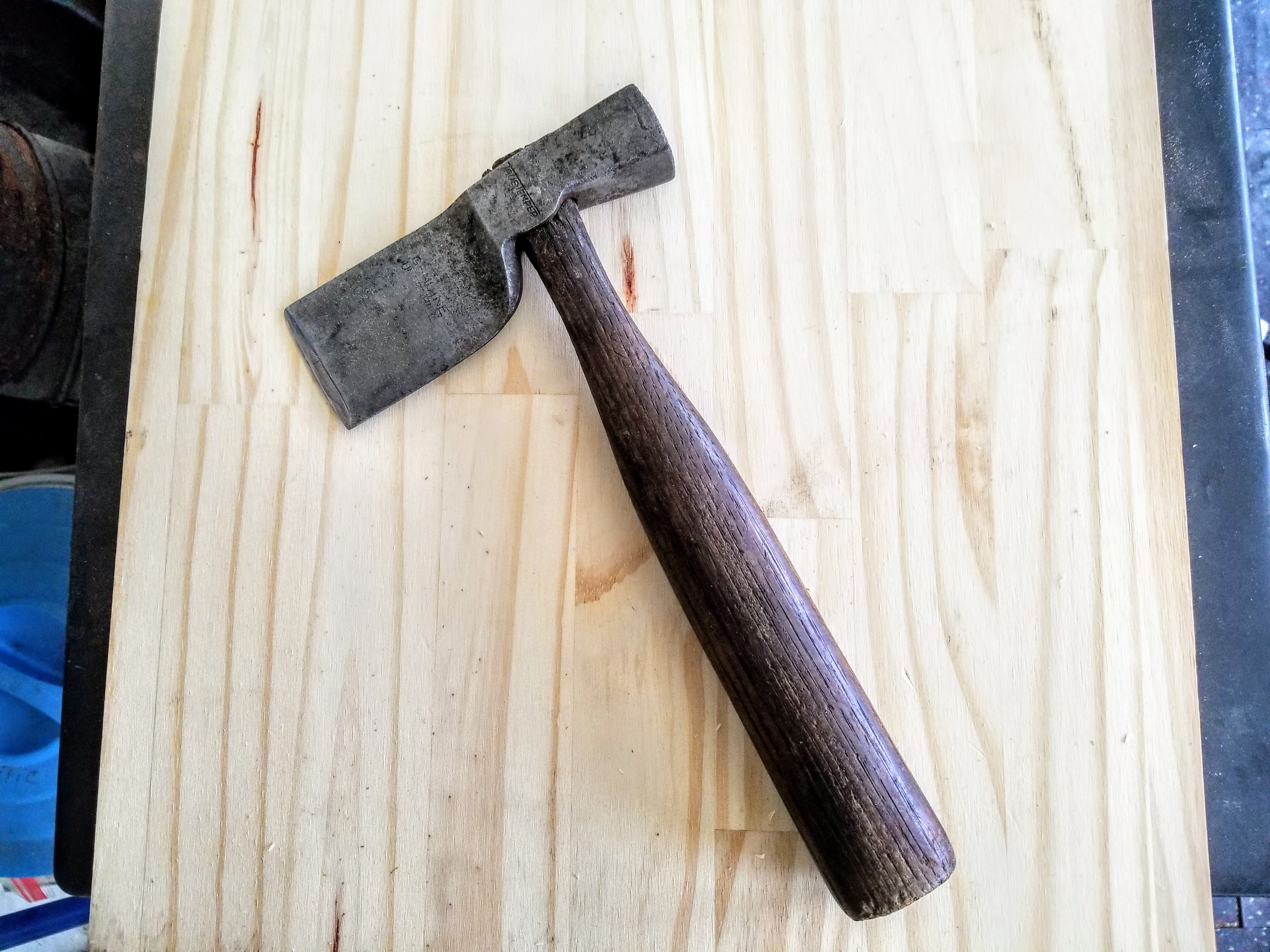
Hatchet

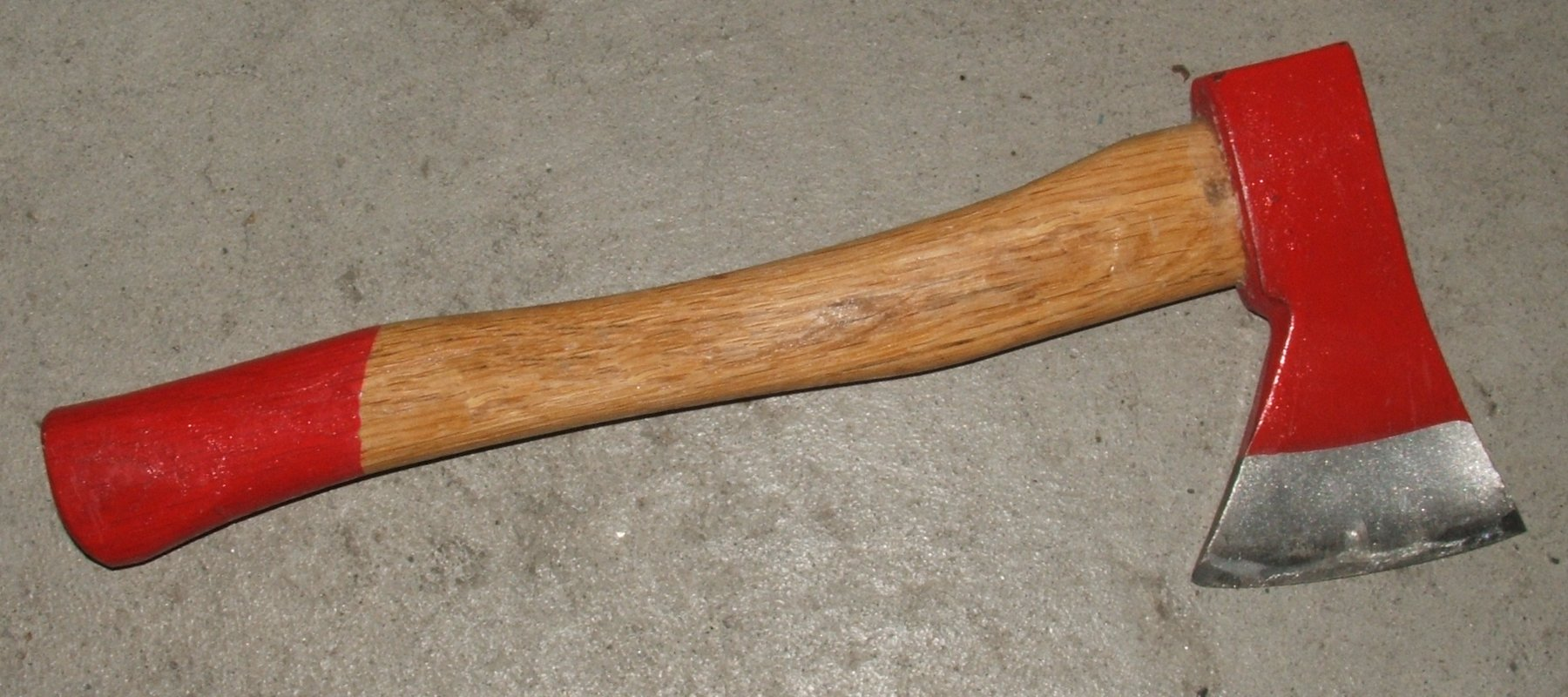
A hand axe (note the lack of a hammer head)

A hatchet (from the Old French hachete, a diminutive form of hache, 'axe' of Germanic origin) is a single-handed striking tool with a sharp blade on one side used to cut and split wood, and a hammerhead on the other side. Hatchets may also be used for hewing when making flattened surfaces on logs; when the hatchet head is optimized for this purpose it is called a hewing hatchet.

The earliest known use of the noun hatchet is in the Middle English period (1150—1500) Although 'hand axe' and 'hatchet' are often used interchangeably in contemporary usage, 19th and 20th century American manufacturers and retailers (Collins, Kelly, Vaughan, Warren, Mann; Simmons, Shapleigh, Sears, et al.) unanimously distinguished hatchets from hand axes in their product catalogs, listing them in separate groupings.

A hand axe (also known by terms including "camp axe", "belt axe", "hunters axe" and others) is a short-handled woods tool. A hatchet is a short-handled construction trades tool with multipurpose head purposely designed for a given application. For this reason, hatchet handles are generally straight so that users can rotate them in their hand to switch from one head feature to the other.

The most common hatchet head patterns are the carpenter's hatchet, roofing/shingling hatchet and lathing/drywall hatchet.

"Hatchet" was used to describe a small battle axe in Middle English.

"Burying the hatchet" is a phrase meaning "making peace," attributed to a Haudenosaunee tradition of hiding or putting away a tomahawk after a peace agreement.

== Sport hatchets ==
Since the late 2010's axe throwing has gained significant popularity all over the world as a sport, particularly with organizations like the World Axe Throwing League being established. The primary competition is hatchet throwing in the axe throwing sport, and there has been development in hatchet designs made specifically as types of throwing axe for sport.

== See also ==
- Axe
- World Axe Throwing League
