= Liter of Light =

Open source light tube design

Litre Of Light
- Type: Social enterprise, Interest group
- Locations: Manila, Philippines (global headquarters); Switzerland (European coordination); Colombia (South American coordination); Pakistan
- Services: Affordable and sustainable light
- Key people: Illac Diaz (founder)
- Website: literoflight.org

Liter of Light is an open source design for a low-cost light tube (or deck prism or vault light) that refracts solar light to provide daytime interior lighting for dwellings with thin rooves. Daylighting is cheaper than using indoor electric lights during the day. The device is constructed simply, using a transparent two-liter bottle filled with water and a small amount of bleach to inhibit algal growth, and fitted into a hole in a roof. The device functions like a deck prism: during daytime the water inside the bottle refracts sunlight, delivering about as much light as a 40–60 watt incandescent bulb to the interior. A properly installed solar bottle can last up to 5 years.

== History ==
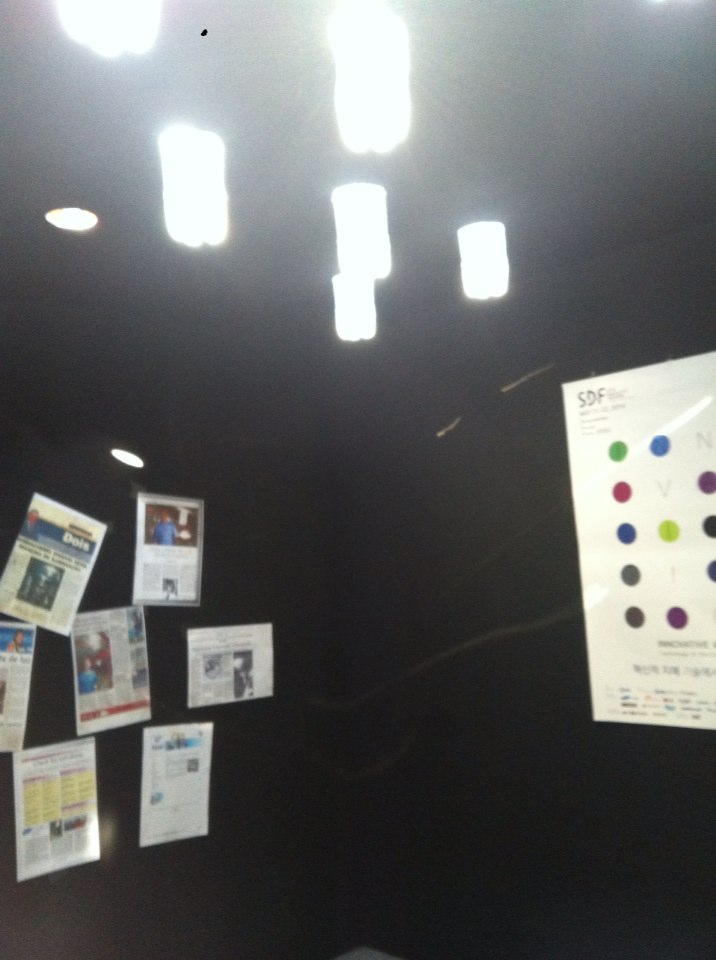
Moser lamps exhibited at the Seoul Design Forum, 2014.

Plastic bottles repurposed to provide indoor daylight lighting were first developed by Alfredo Moser of Brazil. The concept was introduced as a social enterprise in the Philippines by Illac Diaz through the My Shelter Foundation in April 2011. To promote sustainable development, Diaz implemented a local entrepreneur business model, enabling community members to assemble and install the bottle bulbs and earn income. Within months, the My Shelter Foundation expanded from a single carpenter in San Pedro, Laguna, to installing 15,000 solar bottle bulbs in twenty cities throughout the Philippines. This success inspired similar initiatives globally.

The foundation also created a training center offering workshops for youth, businesses, and volunteers interested in building solar bottle bulbs in their communities.

Within the first year, over 200,000 bottle bulbs were installed worldwide. In 2014, Liter of Light set a goal to illuminate 1 million homes by the end of 2015.

In January 2015, Liter of Light received the Zayed Future Energy Prize in the Non-Profit Organization category. The initiative’s founder, Illac Diaz, was presented with the award during the Abu Dhabi Sustainability Week at the Abu Dhabi National Exhibition Centre. It was also selected as one of 120 Global Innovators for the EXPOLive Impact Innovation Grant program at EXPO 2020 in Dubai.

== Technology description ==
Cross-section schematic of a Liter of Light solar bottle. The bottle, containing water and bleach, is held in place with glue or sealant.

The Solar Bottle Bulb, as it is also known, is installed through the roofs of homes to refract sunlight and illuminate interior spaces. The innovation consists in employing inexpensive, durable, and widely available materials to provide quality natural lighting. This offers a cost-effective and environmentally sustainable alternative to electric lighting during daytime, particularly benefiting low-income urban populations.

The most common bottles used are 1.5-liter plastic containers. These are filled with water and a small amount of bleach to inhibit algae growth. The bottle is inserted through a hole in a corrugated metal roof and secured with a steel sheet acting as a lock to prevent slippage. Sealant is applied around the hole to ensure the installation is weatherproof. The water’s refractive properties diffuse sunlight, producing an omnidirectional light equivalent to a 40–60 watt incandescent bulb, depending on solar insolation.

Installation instructions and material lists are publicly available online, supporting the spread of the technology through open-source principles.

=== Adhesive ===
Selecting a durable, waterproof, and sun-resistant adhesive that effectively fills gaps is a key challenge in the installation process. Various local groups have tested different adhesives to balance cost and performance. Silicone-based and polyurethane adhesives have generally proven to be the most effective solutions. The inventor, Alfredo Moser, employed polyester resin to secure the bottles.

Rigid glass bottles have also been utilized, and may allow easier sealing compared to flexible plastic bottles. Some sealants chemically interact with plastic, causing brittleness over time. Silicone-based sealants can form chemical bonds with glass, potentially enhancing the durability of the installation.

== Countries ==
=== Argentina ===
Liter of Light operates in Argentina through the NGO Litro de Luz. Volunteers train communities to install and maintain the lights in homes and streets, with activities in Buenos Aires, La Matanza, Rosario, and Córdoba, and support for projects in Peru, Venezuela and Ecuador. In 2019, the initiative won in the Sustainable Cities category at the sixth Latin America Verde Awards in Guayaquil, Ecuador, aiming to install about 400 systems per year to reduce waste and improve public health.

=== Bangladesh ===
Liter of Light with Light Foundation based in Chittagong developed a local version of the bottle light called 'Botol Bati,' costing approximately $2 to 2.50 USD and lasting 4 to 5 years. The organization aims to promote awareness of bottle lights in remote areas by training local school students.

Approximately 45% of the Bangladeshi population lack access to electricity, and about 24% live in slums where electricity is often obtained illegally. The Lights Foundation’s goal is to serve these communities.

=== Brazil ===
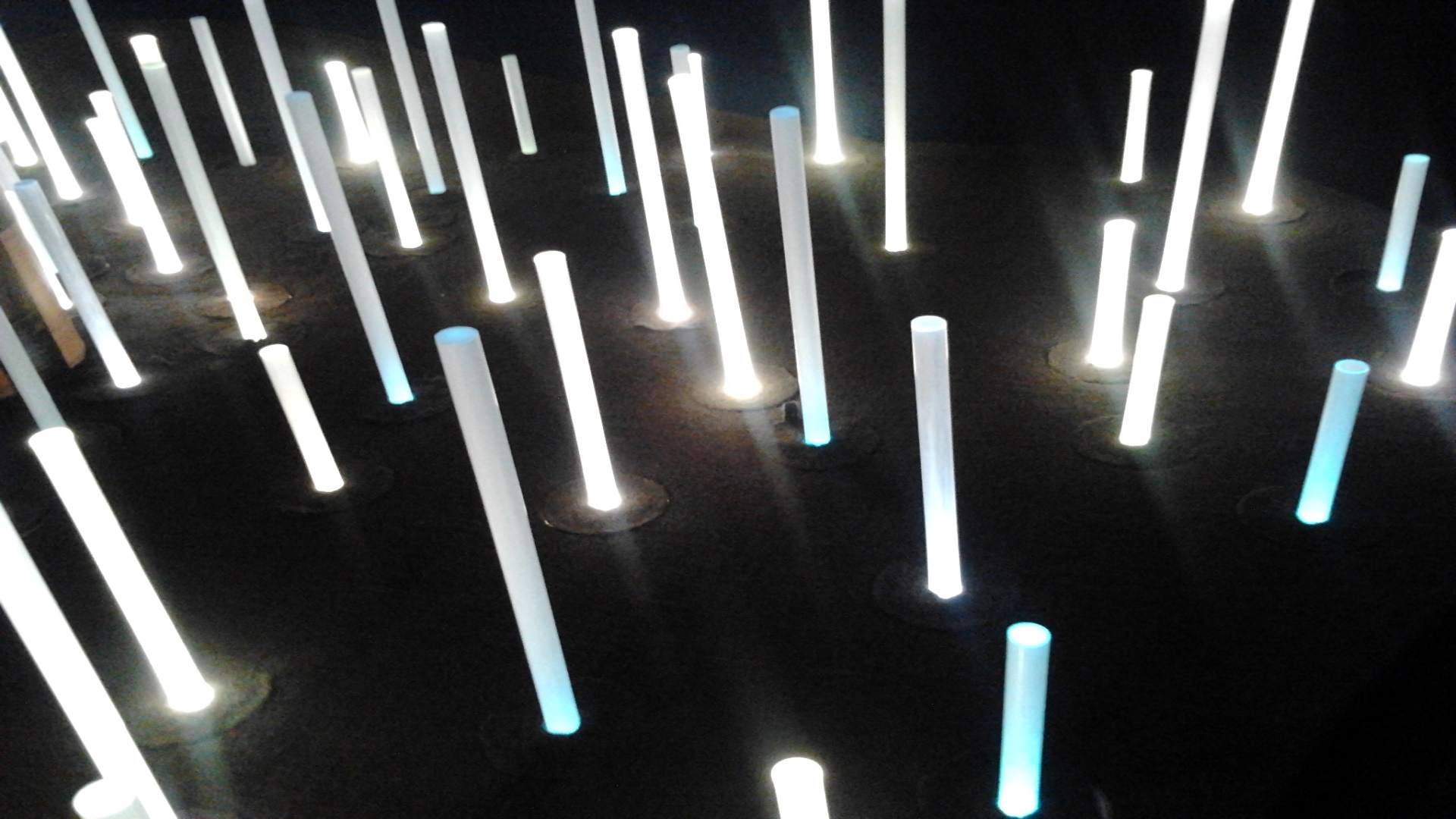
Rod-shaped Moser lamps on display at the Museum of Tomorrow in Rio de Janeiro.

In Brazil, the project began in December 2012 when Alanna Sousa and Pedro Santos decided to implement Liter of Light in the country. In 2013, Vitor Belota, who happened to be Alanna's neighbor, was also motivated to introduce Liter of Light to Brazil after learning about the project in Kenya. The trio met and conducted a pilot project, installing the first daytime solutions in two communities in Santa Catarina.

In 2015, recognizing that Brazilian communities presented distinct contexts and needs, the project began focusing on nighttime street lighting, carrying out its first installation in June of that year in the Vila Beira-Mar community, Rio de Janeiro.

Since then, Litro de Luz Brasil has become an established non-profit organization that has directly impacted over 20,000 Brazilians through more than 3,700 installations, reaching upwards of 120 communities nationwide.

=== Chile ===
Liter of Light began operating in Chile in 2015, installing 50 eco-friendly streetlights in Renca. The five-meter posts were built using bamboo, PVC, wood, and plastic bottles, fitted with solar panels and batteries lasting up to 28 hours. The project, carried out with support from CCU and the Festival Internacional de Innovación Social (FIIS), provided sustainable lighting for streets, a plaza, and a multi-purpose sports court, benefiting families without regular electricity supply.

=== China ===
Liter Of Light China was created by three international students from China in 2016, and the first project in Rudong will be conducted in the early summer, 2017.

=== Colombia ===
The Liter of Light movement in Colombia was initiated by Camilo Herrera in the small town of Duitama in the Boyacá Department, about 200 kilometers north of Bogotá. After launching a pilot project in Bogotá in collaboration with Liter of Light Switzerland in February 2012, a local organization was established. The first bottle lights in Bogotá were installed in the Divino Niño and La Colina neighborhoods of Ciudad Bolívar. Volunteers in Bogotá are also working closely with Un Techo Para Mi País to identify areas in need.

=== Dominican Republic ===
Liter of Light was started up in the Dominican Republic by the German volunteer Nicolai Rapp in 2015 who then distributed the project with other German and local volunteers in over 7 provinces.

Under the name Litro de Luz–República Dominicana, the group installed bottle and solar nightlights in more than 1,000 houses through global fundraising. In the focus of their movement are the rural areas without or with limited access to electricity. The idea was also presented to several local NGOs in seminars and workshops to reach all the off-grid communities of the country. Later, their efforts also focused on bringing the project to Haiti, where around 75% of the population has to live without access to electricity.

=== Egypt ===
A group of seven students from the French University in Egypt (UFE) began the Liter of Light project locally as part of a social and environmental development initiative.

In November 2014, PepsiCo announced that it would implement the Liter of Light project in three villages in Upper Egypt, in partnership with Sunutions, a solar solutions company, and the Masr ElKheir Foundation.

=== France ===
Liter of Light France was established in 2015. The French branch links educational projects in Europe with international cooperation activities. Its focus is to inform younger generations in Europe about energy poverty and the potential of low-cost solutions to address social and environmental challenges.

It also seeks to share these approaches with communities in developing countries. In its international actions, Liter of Light France promotes accessible technological solutions and capacity building. The branch is coordinated by Olivier Lasbouygues.

=== India ===
Liter of Light was introduced in India in Vikarabad, a rural village in Telangana, in 2011. With support from several NGOs and organizations, awareness campaigns and workshops were conducted in cities including Hyderabad, Mumbai, Chennai, Kolkata, Jalpaiguri, and Delhi.

Beginning with a single bottle in Vikarabad, the Indian team now installs multiple units in homes of the underprivileged and mentors other organizations, NGOs, student groups, and communities in need. A demonstration of Liter of Light took place at TEDxChristUniversity in November 2012. In 2014, the Desire Foundation in Bhubaneswar implemented the project during Diwali to celebrate the festival of lights with underprivileged communities.

=== Kenya ===
The Liter of Light initiative in Kenya began in 2011 with the youth organization Koch Hope, which installed solar bottle lights in the Korogocho informal settlement in Nairobi Province.

In 2013, initiative began operating in the Maasai Mara region through local training programs that enable communities to produce solar lights using recycled bottles and local materials. These lights provide homes with basic night-time illumination and serve as communal lighting to reduce the risk of wildlife damaging crops and livestock.

=== Malaysia ===
Liter of Light Malaysia operates as a local chapter of the global initiative, aiming to provide affordable, sustainable lighting solutions to underserved communities. The project focuses on adapting the solar bottle light technology to local conditions and materials. It engages volunteers and partners with community organizations to implement installations and raise awareness about renewable lighting options.

=== Mexico ===
Liter of Light was initiated in Mexico in early 2013, sponsored by Qohélet A.C. The group was founded by Tere Gonzalez, who had previously worked with Liter of Light in India and Spain. Operations began with a pilot program in the state of Chihuahua, benefiting 114 people. As of September 2013, the group was working to complete the next phase of installations in Ajusco, Mexico City, aimed at benefiting an additional 500 families.

=== Nepal ===
"Ujyalo," meaning "light" in Nepali, is a project modeled after the Liter of Light initiative. The program focuses on producing solar bottle lights to improve access to sustainable daytime lighting in Nepal. It was established by the Ujyalo Foundation.

=== Netherlands ===
Liter of Light Netherlands coordinates international projects by raising funds, conducting training, and collaborating with local partners.

In 2016, it partnered with the NGO Lend a Hand to install bottle lights in Potchefstroom, South Africa, with local training held in Maastricht. The following year, representatives and students from The Chinese University of Hong Kong, in cooperation with the Myanmar Red Cross Society, installed solar lanterns for 67 households in Taungdwingyi township, and held workshops on maintenance.

=== Pakistan ===
A partnership was established with the Ace Welfare Foundation in Pakistan. Given the objectives of both organizations and the fact that more than 11% of the Pakistani population lives without access to electricity, including 50,000 villages that are completely disconnected from the national grid, the partnership mobilizes local volunteers and corporate sponsors to implement the Liter of Light project and expand it to thousands of households.

=== Panama ===
In 2016, Liter of Light Panama was founded to address the issue of energy poverty affecting thousands of people nationwide. The initiative focuses on sustainable and ecological lighting solutions while engaging volunteers to support affected communities.

=== Peru ===
Established in 2019 and led by José Luis Arrieta, Liter of Light Peru carried out an early project in a Moquegua community, where solar lamps replaced hazardous candle lighting, improving local safety.

=== Philippines ===
The solution was first launched in the Philippines by Illac Diaz under the MyShelter Foundation. As of July 2011, the organization had installed 10,000 bottles in the Philippines, and shortly thereafter reached 15,000 installations, with a goal for 2012 to reach 1 million homes. In order to help the idea grow sustainably, they implemented a “local entrepreneur” business model, whereby bottles are assembled and installed by locals who can earn a small income for their work. Additionally, a Liter of Light office has been established that conducts volunteer workshops.

=== Spain ===
In June 2012, Liter of Light España collaborated with the Spanish NGO Fundación Secretariado Gitano to install daylight bottle lamps in several Roma households in Cañada Real, Madrid. The pilot project brought natural light into dwellings that lacked adequate daylight and electricity supply.

=== Switzerland ===
Liter of Light Switzerland began as a project of the SIMagination Challenge at the University of St. Gallen. The project expanded and was established as a student club at the University of St. Gallen, and later as a non-profit organization in Switzerland in November 2011. The organization's first project was to plan and implement a pilot in Bogotá together with Litro de Luz Colombia. The pilot took place in February 2012 and, together, they installed bottles in Ciudad Bolívar and Bogotá. Throughout 2012, Liter of Light Switzerland undertook additional projects in Spain, India, and Bangladesh.

The Swiss NGO plans to continue sharing lessons learned and spreading the concept via a global platform, as well as launching more pilots around the world.

=== Tanzania ===
In Tanzania, the Liter of Light initiative was launched in April 2013 through a collaboration between World Unite! and local non-governmental organizations. The project operates in multiple locations, including Dar es Salaam, Moshi/Kilimanjaro, and Zanzibar.

=== Uganda ===
In 2013, a local Liter of Light project was currently in development in Uganda.

=== United States ===
In the United States, Liter of Light USA operates as an independent organization headquartered in New York City. The organization conducts workshops and events to educate the public and engage volunteers in sustainable lighting solutions. It has partnered with military and community groups to implement practical training and installation projects.

=== Zambia ===
A local project is underway.

== Awards and recognition ==
- 2014: The World Habitat Award
- 2015: The Zayed Future Energy Prize
- 2016: The St Andrews Prize for the Environment

== See also ==
- Anidolic lighting and Daylighting, broader concepts
- Deck prism and Vault light, older glass versions
- Daylight redirecting film
- Glass brick
