= Iluméxico =

Iluméxico is a social enterprise and a for-profit company co-founded in 2009 by a group of eight students from the National Autonomous University of Mexico (UNAM) and Universidad Iberoamericana (IBERO), including Manuel Wiechers. Iluméxico was founded in Mexico City.

Iluméxico provides alternative energy services using solar technology systems. Iluméxico's services include research, production, equipment development, installation, maintenance and technical support for individuals, households, business and public services. Iluméxico primarily focuses in rural communities that are outside the electrical grid. The company has installed more than 26,000 solar solutions in Mexico, Colombia and the United States, reaching more than 125,000 people.

== Origin and history ==
Iluméxico originated from the “Prometeo”, a solar energy prototype and business model created by a multidisciplinary team of students from UNAM and Universidad Iberoamericana for a sustainability competition. The Prometeo prototype was designed by Martín García and Hugo Ham, while the business model was developed by Manuel Wiechers, Mariana González, and Gerardo Ruiz de Teresa. The project later evolved into Iluméxico.

Iluméxico initially operated as a non-governmental organization (NGO) before changing into a for-profit social enterprise to scale its operations and achieve long-term sustainability. Iluméxico is a certified B corporation.

Manuel Wiechers participated in the Global Social Benefit Institute (GSBI) accelerator program in 2013 at Santa Clara University, where it refined Ilumexico's business plan and impact metrics with global mentors.

At its beginnings Iluméxico operated from a centralized location in Mexico City, but later established regional centers named “ILUCentros” to engage and provide technical support locally in the communities.

== Technology ==
Iluméxico designs, installs, and maintains solar home systems, micro-grids, and related technologies aimed at expanding access to electricity in areas not connected to the national grid. Its equipment includes photovoltaic cell panels that capture solar energy and batteries. Iluméxico primarily uses a 325-Watt solar panels which are capable of powering light bulbs and small appliances, making them suitable for the energy consumption in off-grid areas.

The company inspects its solar panels periodically, employing monitoring systems to detect malfunctions and verifying their installations. Their maintenance strategy allows creating job opportunities in the communities.

Iluméxico also collaborates with micro-finance institutions that allows their users to pay for solar systems through installments aligned with their financial capabilities.

== Awards and recognition ==
- In 2011, Iluméxico was granted the Young Innovators Award by World Summit Awards (WSA), recognizing its use of technology to provide clean energy solutions to communities in Mexico.
- Iluméxico received the Zayed Future Energy Prize in 2014.
- In October 2014, Inter-American Development Bank (IDB) supported Iluméxico by funding $495,533 USD, through the Multilateral Investment Fund (MIF), for its business model and scale operations.
- In 2015, Iluméxico joined the Business Call to Action (BCtA), a United Nations global initiative that encourages companies to develop inclusive business models. Iluméxico aimed to expand its reach to 50,000 off-grid rural homes in Mexico.
- In May 2022, Amundi Finance & Solidarité (the Social Impact fund by Amundi) invested €2 million in Iluméxico.
