= DRF (disambiguation) =

DRF often refers to the Daily Racing Form, an American horse-racing newspaper founded in 1894.

DRF may also refer to:

- Depression range finder, a fire control device used to observe the target's range and bearing to calculate firing solutions
- Dabur Research Foundation, an Indian contract research organization offering pre-clinical services in drug discovery and development, related to the company Dabur
- DRF Luftrettung, part of the German emergency medical services, formerly Deutsche Rettungsflugwacht e.V.
- Direction de la recherche fondamentale (fundamental research division), a division of the French Alternative Energies and Atomic Energy Commission (CEA)
- Daylight redirecting film, a thin, flexible plastic film which can be applied to a window to refract or reflect incoming light upwards
- Driving-related fear, or driving phobia
- .drf, a camera raw image format (used by Kodak)
