= Solar tube =

A solar tube may refer to:

- Evacuated tube collector – a type of high efficiency solar thermal collector
- Light tube
