= World Knife Throwing League =

Sporting organization for knife throwing

World Knife Throwing League (WKTL)
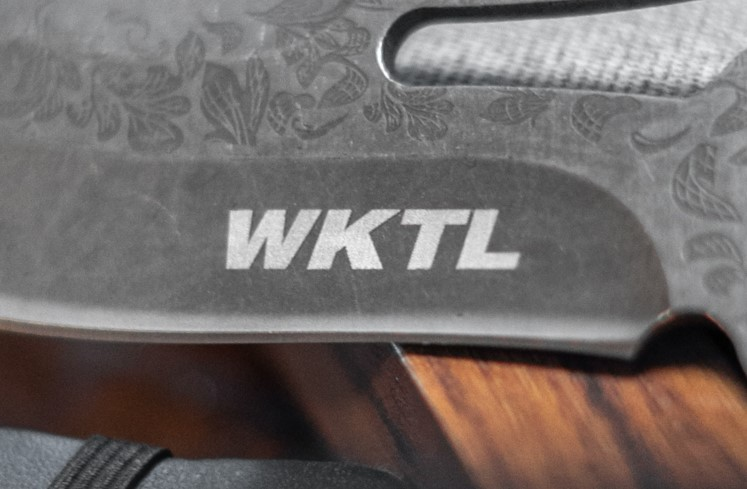
- Sport: Knife throwing
- Founded: January 2021 (5 years ago)
- First season: Spring 2021
- Commissioner: Mario Zelaya
- Countries: 5
- Most recent champion: Shane Funke
- Website: worldknifethrowingleague.com

The World Knife Throwing League (WKTL) is a sports organization that hopes to be the ruling body for commercial knife throwing venues.

WKTL was founded in 2021 as a sister league to the World Axe Throwing League by venue representatives from Canada, the United States of America, and the United Kingdom. It has 5 knife-throwing nations with membership. Members include over 30 member companies (affiliates). It organizes international tournament events such as the U.S. Open and, most notably, the World Knife Throwing Championship.

It also appoints judges who officiate at all sanctioned leagues and tournaments. It promotes the WKTL Code of Conduct, which sets professional standards of discipline for knife throwing in commercial venues.

== Scoring ==
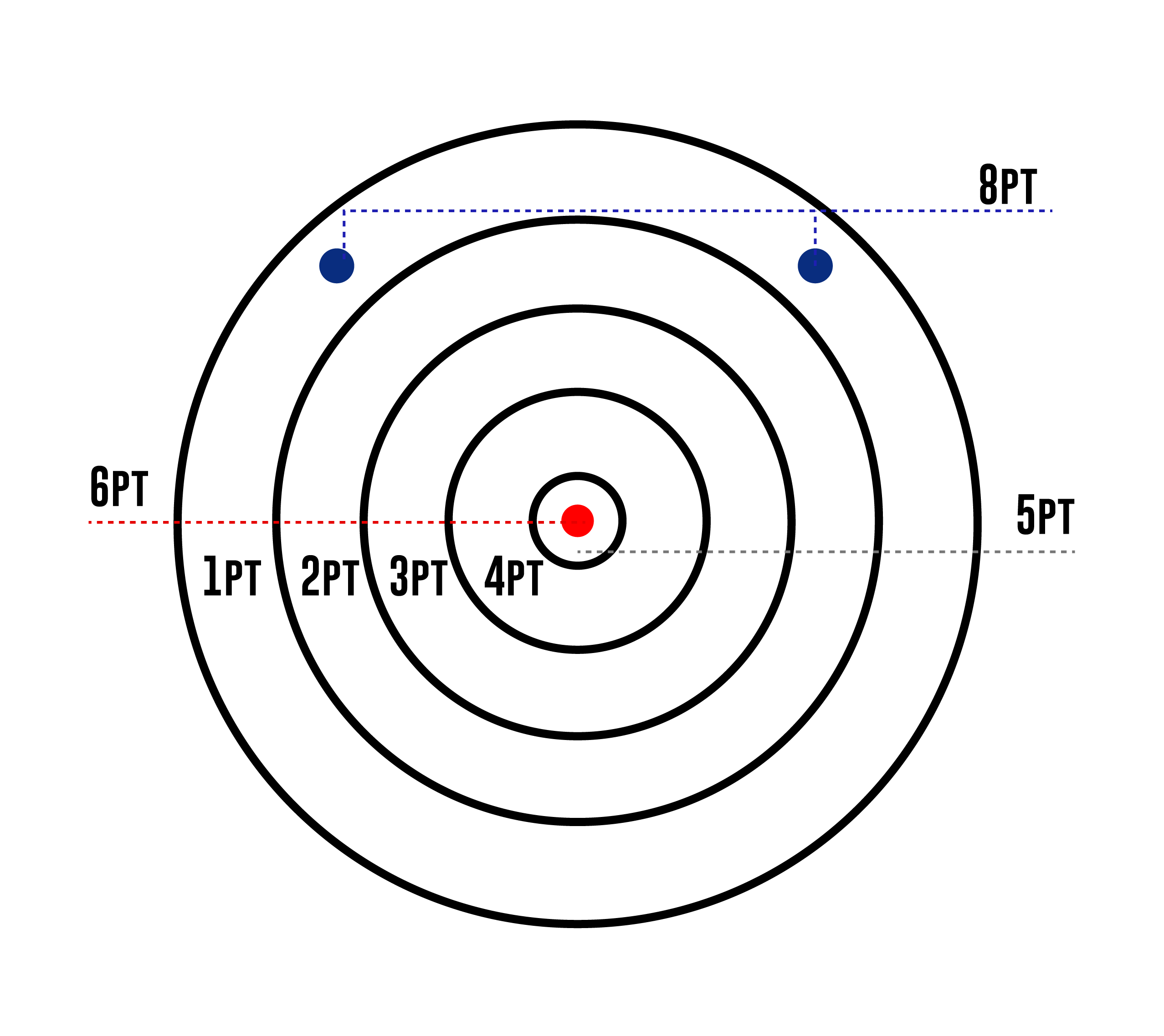
An example of WKTL targets with the points shown in their respective zones

Scoring is a match system where ten knives are thrown per match. The player with the highest points of their ten thrown knives wins the match. In case of a tie, a "Sudden Death" throw is made for the highest score. Sudden death throws are done until one thrower scores higher than the other. Scoring is determined by where the knife hits the target. The WKTL targets have a red bullseye, followed by five empty rings. The scoring is 6, 5, 4, 3, 2, and 1 point respectively. Additionally, there are blue dots in the 1 point ring, known as "Kill-shot," and be hit twice per match for 8 points. Point scoring is based on the highest point value the knife touches when it lands and sticks.

== Tournaments ==
In 2021 WKTL started working on a tournament format to help include any throwers who could not regularly participate in the WKTL knife throwing seasons. The first official WKTL tournament is the 2021 US Open Tournament. This is also the first knife throwing tournament to be featured on ESPN

US Open Results
Year	Champion	Location	2nd Place
2021	Travis Blank	(United States) Atlanta, Georgia	Michael Dixon
2022	Lucas Johnson	(United States) Minneapolis, Minnesota	Austin Bock

In 2023 the World Knife Throwing League discontinued the U.S Open in favor of re-branding it as the Pro-Am Championship. This tournament was made to highlight professional throwers as well as amateur ones, in addition to introducing many new styles of gameplay for axe and knife throwing, known as the Skills Challenges.

Pro-Am Results
Year	Pro-Am Knife Champion	Location	2nd Place
2023	Sebastian Arnold	(United States) Appleton, Wisconsin	Thomas Antoniello

== Championship ==
The World Knife Throwing Championship (for commercial venues) takes place once per year. The format has slight changes from year to year, announced before the beginning of the yearly competition.

Knife Throwing World Champions
Competition Year	World Champion	Location Represented	Country	2nd Place
2021	Mike Philabaum	Mountainman Axe throwing	USA (United States)	Shane Shepard
2022	Mike Kump	Angry Axe	USA (United States)	Tony Luce
2023	Lucas Johnson	Murfreesboro Axe throwing	USA (United States)	Sebastian Arnold
2024	Coleman Bates	Throw Nation	USA (United States)	Lucas Johnson
2025	Shane Funke	Ironside Axe Club	USA (United States)	Eli Morton

=== Knife Duals ===
In 2024, the World Knife Throwing League added Knife Duals as an official discipline for competition in league and tournament play.

Duals Champions
Competition Year	World Champions	Country	2nd Place
2024	Thomas Antoniello & Sebastian Arnold	USA (United States)	Kinson Michel & Mat Ball
2025	Colbe Pudell & Louie Perkins	USA (United States)	Dylan Teets & Jeb Bisset

== International Knife Throwing Day ==
This day (8th of September) was created by the World Knife Throwing League to celebrate, raise awareness and unify the sport of knife throwing. Though primarily celebrated with affiliates in the WKTL, it is also celebrated by anyone with a passion for the sport around the world.

== History ==
=== 2021 ===
- The founding of WKTL.
- The founding of International Knife Throwing Day (June 13th).
- Evan Walters is announced as the Commissioner of WKTL.
- Inaugural representatives from 3 countries joined the WKTL. From the United States, Canada, and the United Kingdom.
- The first World Knife Throwing Championship is held at the historic country music honky tonk, Billy Bob's Texas.

=== 2022 ===
- The WKTL releases over a dozen new knives.
- WKTL and Toro Knives partnered to create league-approved knives.
- WKTL publishes a list of pre-approved knives for competition.
- The inaugural WKTC Awards are created featuring Thrower Awards, Venue Awards, and Commissioner's Choice Awards.

=== 2023 ===
- The WKTL forms an advisory volunteer council made up of throwers and venue owners to help "shape the future of the sport".
- The first Pro-Am Championship is held hosting professional and amateur throwers.
- The first venue in Poland is introduced. Bringing the total number of countries to 4 with WKTL members

=== 2024 ===
- The WKTL introduced Duals as an official discipline. Where teams of two throw together.
- A venue in Mexico joins as the first WKTL member in the country bringing the total number of countries with WKTL representatives to 5.

== Commissioners ==
The Commissioner of WKTL heads the direction of the World Knife Throwing League and manages the sport.

WKTL Commissioners
Years Active	Name	Country
2021 - 2026	Evan Walters	United States
2026 - Present	Mario Zelaya	Canada

== WKTL Members Around the World ==
Country	Region	Admitted	No. of Locations
United States of America	North America	2021	50+
Canada	North America	2021	20+
United Kingdom	Europe	2021	1
Poland	Europe	2023	1
Mexico	North America	2024	1
