= Light tube =

Architectural structures that transmit or distribute light

Total external reflection, hollow light tube

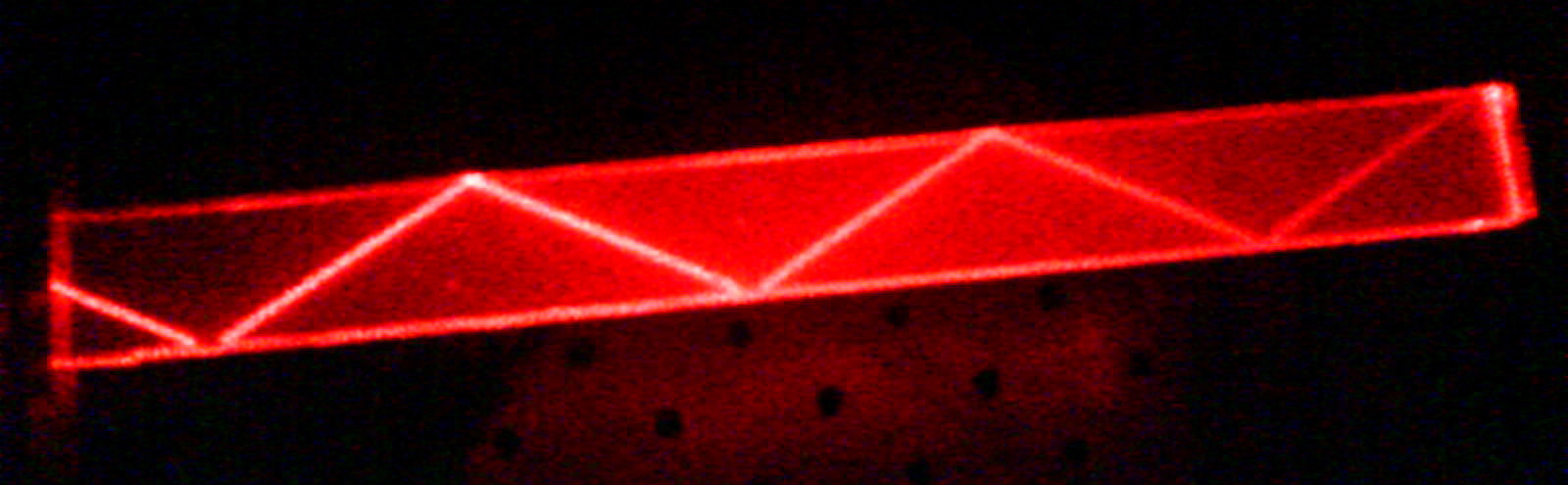
Total internal reflection, block of acrylic

Light tubes (also known as solar pipes, tubular skylights or sun tunnels) are structures that transmit or distribute natural or artificial light for the purpose of illumination and are examples of optical waveguides.

In their application to daylighting, they are also often called tubular daylighting devices, sun pipes, sun scopes, or daylight pipes. They can be divided into two broad categories: hollow structures that contain the light with reflective surfaces; and transparent solids that contain the light by total internal reflection. Principles of nonimaging optics govern the flow of light through them.

== Types ==
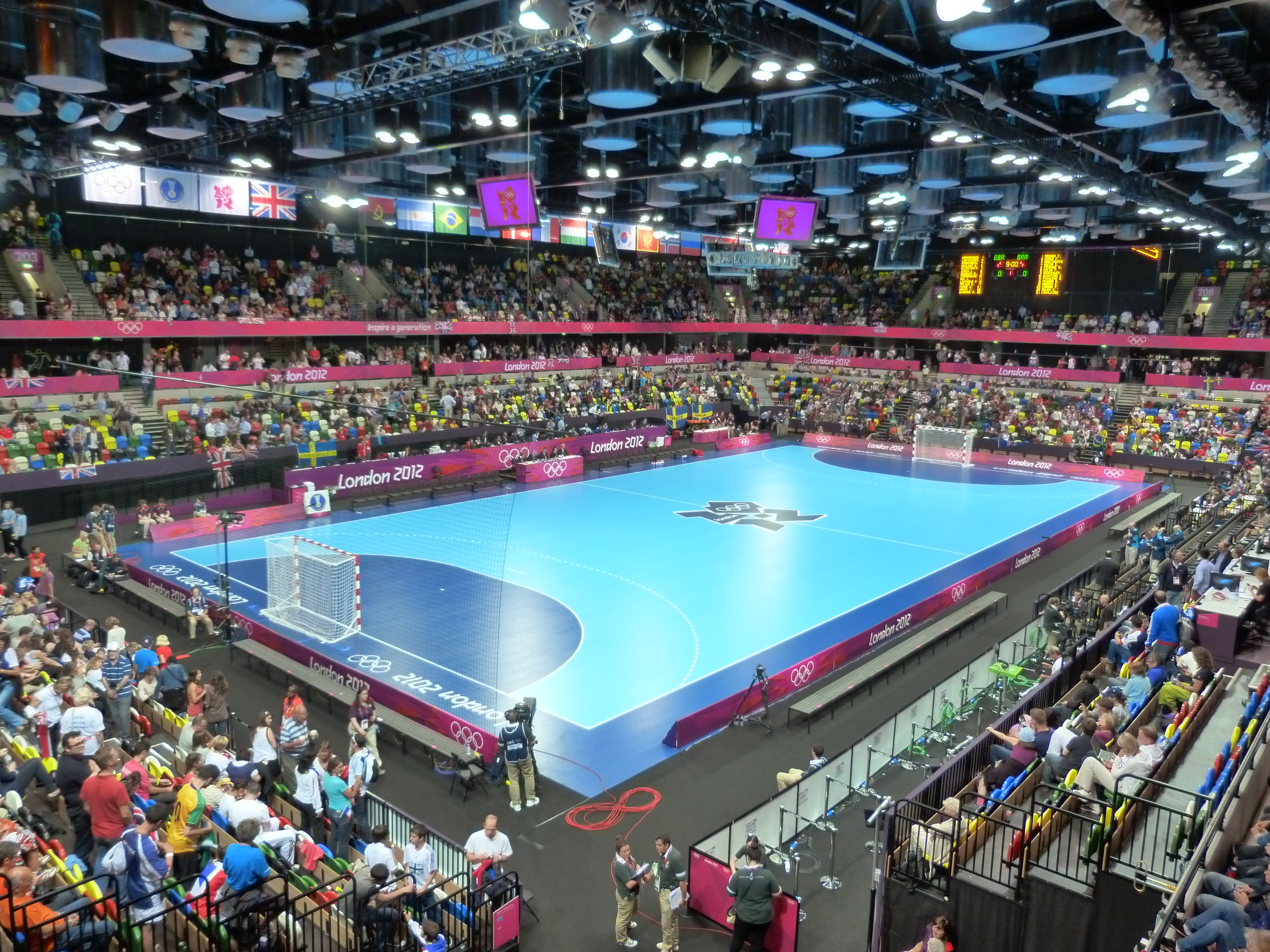
The Copper Box, venue for Handball at the 2012 Summer Olympics, makes use of light tubes to reduce energy use.

=== IR light tubes ===
Manufacturing custom designed infrared light pipes, hollow waveguides and homogenizers is non-trivial. This is because these are tubes lined with a highly polished infrared reflective coating of gold, which can be applied thick enough to permit these tubes to be used in highly corrosive atmospheres. Carbon black can be applied to certain parts of light pipes to absorb IR light (see photonics). This is done to limit IR light to only certain areas of the pipe.

While most light pipes are produced with a round cross-section, light pipes are not limited to this geometry. Square and hexagonal cross-sections are used in special applications. Hexagonal pipes tend to produce the most homogenized type of IR Light. The pipes do not need to be straight. Bends in the pipe have little effect on efficiency.

=== Light tube with reflective material ===
A light tube installed in the subterranean train station at Potsdamer Platz, Berlin

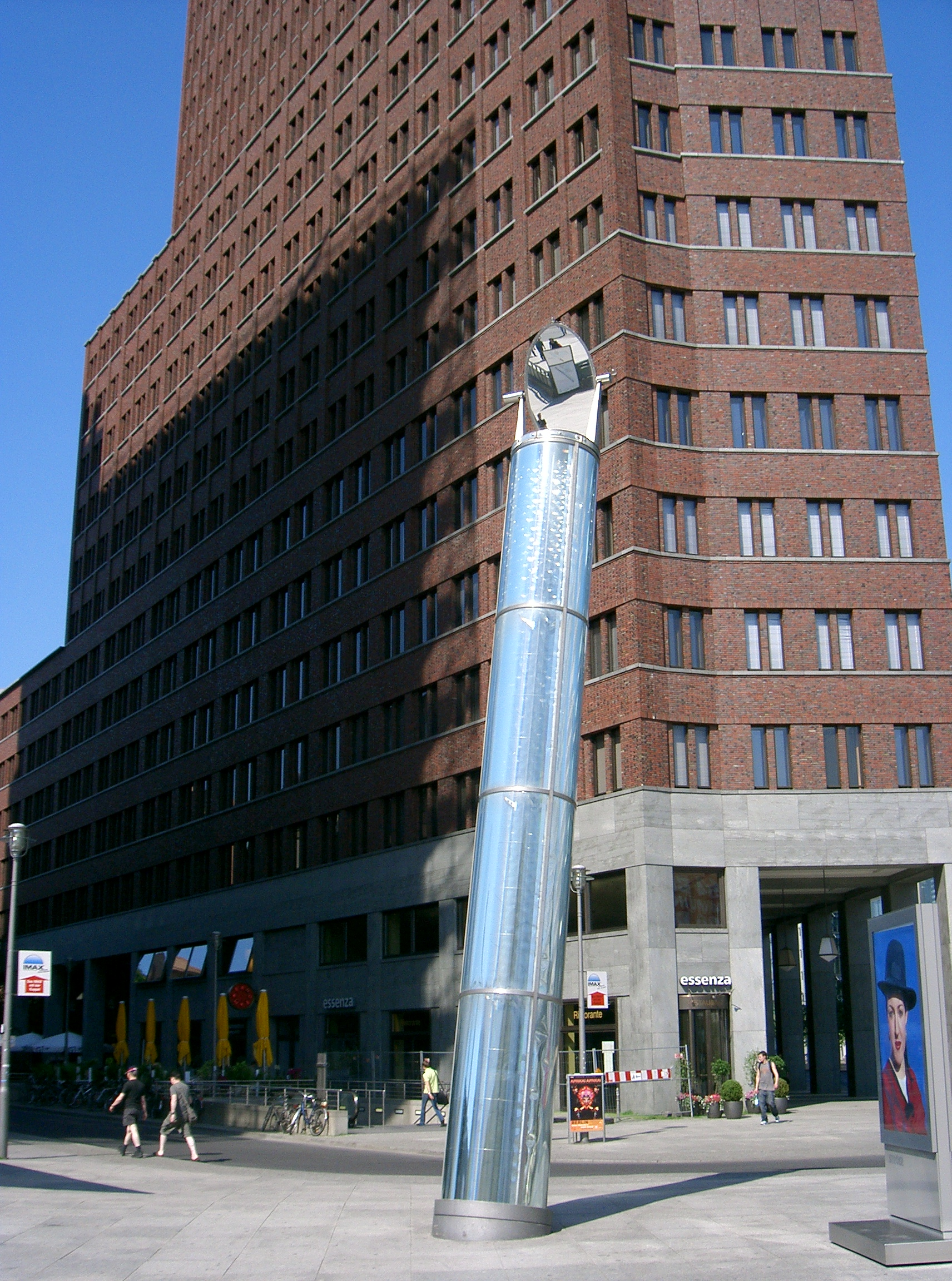
Capturing sunlight above ground

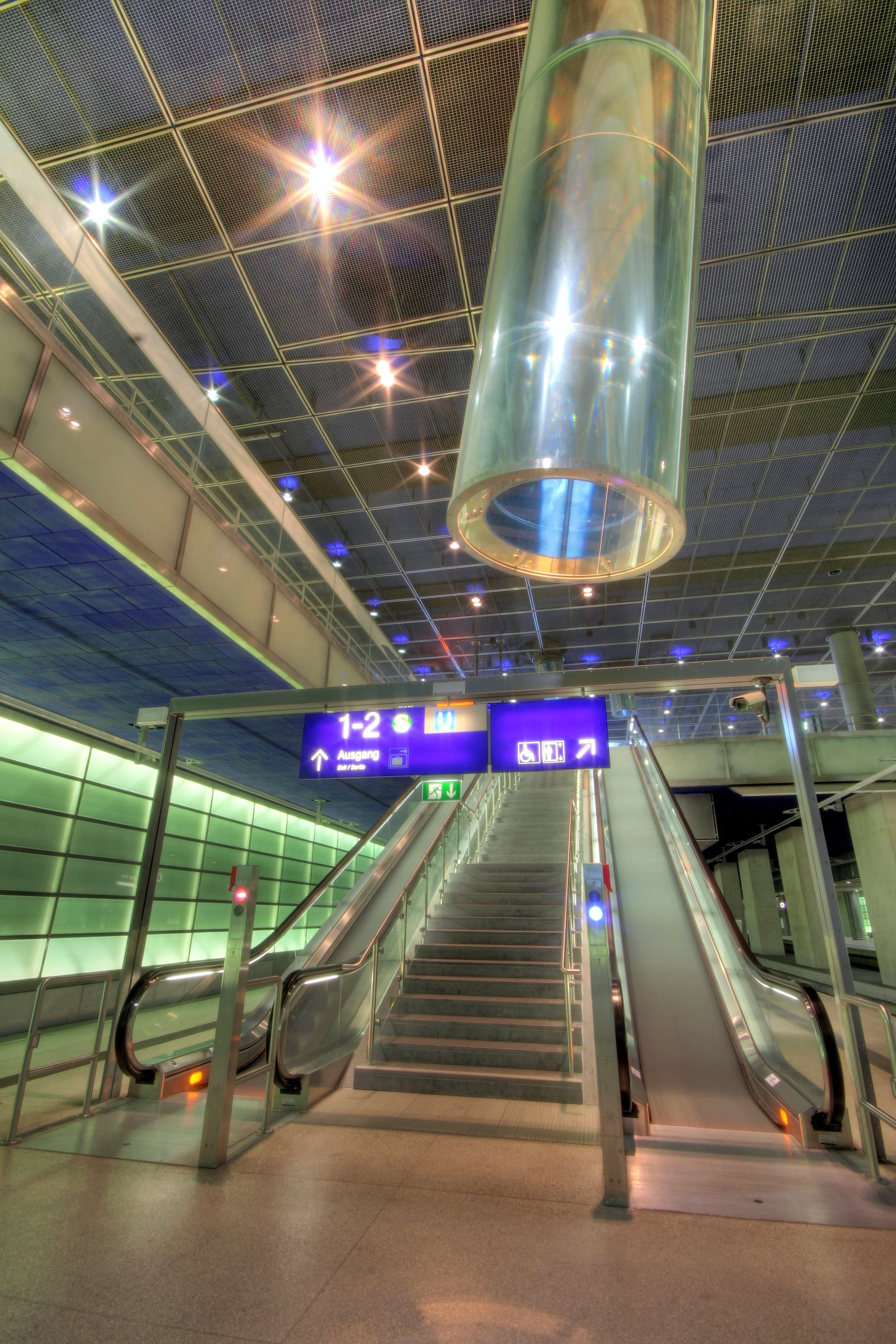
Distributing sunlight below ground

The first commercial reflector systems were patented and marketed in the 1850s by Paul Emile Chappuis in London, using various forms of angled mirror designs. Chappuis Ltd's reflectors were in continuous production until the factory was destroyed in 1943. The concept was rediscovered and patented in 1986 by Solatube International of Australia. This system has been marketed for widespread residential and commercial use. Other daylighting products are on the market under various generic names, such as "SunScope", "solar pipe", "light pipe", "light tube", and "tubular skylight".

A tube lined with highly reflective material leads the light rays through a building, starting from an entrance-point located on its roof or one of its outer walls. A light tube is not intended for imaging (in contrast to a periscope, for example); thus image distortions pose no problem and are in many ways encouraged due to the reduction of "directional" light.

The entrance point usually comprises a dome (cupola), which has the function of collecting and reflecting as much sunlight as possible into the tube. Many units also have directional "collectors", "reflectors", or even Fresnel lens devices that assist in collecting additional directional light down the tube.

In 1994, the Windows and Daylighting Group at Lawrence Berkeley National Laboratory (LBNL) developed a series of horizontal light pipe prototypes to increase daylight illuminance at distances of 4.6-9.1 m, to improve the uniformity of daylight distribution and luminance gradient across the room under variable sun and sky conditions throughout the year. The light pipes were designed to passively transport daylighting through relatively small inlet glazing areas by reflecting sunlight to depths greater than conventional sidelight windows or skylights.

A set-up in which a laser cut acrylic panel is arranged to redirect sunlight into a horizontally or vertically orientated mirrored pipe, combined with a light spreading system with a triangular arrangement of laser cut panels that spread the light into the room, was developed at the Queensland University of Technology in Brisbane. In 2003, Veronica Garcia Hansen, Ken Yeang, and Ian Edmonds were awarded the Far East Economic Review Innovation Award in bronze for this development.

Light transmission efficiency is greatest if the tube is short and straight. In longer, angled, or flexible tubes, part of the light intensity is lost. To minimize losses, a high reflectivity of the tube lining is crucial; manufacturers claim reflectivities of their materials, in the visible range, of up to almost 99.5 percent.

At the end point (the point of use), a diffuser spreads the light into the room.

The first full-scale passive horizontal light pipes were built at the Daylight Lab at Texas A&M University, where the annual daylight performance was thoroughly evaluated in a 360° rotating 6 m wide by 10 m deep room. The pipe is coated with a 99.3% specular reflective film and the distribution element at the end of the light pipe consists of a 4.6 m long diffusing radial film with an 87% visible transmittance. The light pipe introduces consistently illuminance levels ranging between 300 and 2,500 lux throughout the year at distances between 7.6 m to 10 m.

To further optimize the use of solar light, a heliostat can be installed which tracks the movement of the sun, thereby directing sunlight into the light tube at all times of the day as far as the surroundings' limitations allow, possibly with additional mirrors or other reflective elements that influence the light path. The heliostat can be set to capture moonlight at night.

=== Optical fiber ===
Optical fibers can also be used for daylighting. A solar lighting system based on plastic optical fibers was in development at Oak Ridge National Laboratory in 2004. The system was installed at the American Museum of Science and Energy, Tennessee, USA, in 2005, and brought to market the same year by the company Sunlight Direct. However, this system was taken off the market in 2009.

In view of the usually small diameter of the fibers, an efficient daylighting set-up requires a parabolic collector to track the sun and concentrate its light. Optical fibers intended for light transport need to propagate as much light as possible within the core; in contrast, optical fibers intended for light distribution are designed to let part of the light leak through their cladding.

Optical fibers are also used in the Bjork system sold by Parans Solar Lighting AB. The optic fibers in this system are made of PMMA (PolyMethyl MethAcrylate) and sheathed with Megolon, a halogen-free thermoplastic resin. A system such as this, however, is quite expensive.

The Parans system consists of three parts. A collector, fiber optic cables, and luminaires spreading the light indoors. One or more collectors are placed on or near the building in a place where they will have good access to direct sunlight. The collector consists of lenses mounted in aluminum profiles with a covering glass as protection. These lenses concentrate sunlight down in the fiber optic cables.

The collectors are modular, which means they come with either 4,6,8,12 or 20 cables depending on the need. Every cable can have an individual length. The fiber optic cables transport the natural light 100 meters (30 floors) in and through the property while retaining both a high level of light quality and light intensity. Examples of implementations are Kastrup Airport, University of Arizona and Stockholm University.

A similar system, but using optical fibers of glass, had earlier been under study in Japan.

Corning Inc. makes Fibrance Light-Diffusing Fiber. Fibrance works by shining a laser through a light-diffusing fiber optic cable. The cable gives off a lighted glow.

Optical fibers are used in fiberscopes for imaging applications.

==== Hybrid solar lighting ====
Hybrid solar lighting (HSL) or hybrid lighting systems combine the use of solar with artificial light for interior illumination by channelling sunlight through fiber-optic cable bundles to provide solar light into rooms without windows or skylights, and by supplementing this natural light with artificial light—typically LED—as required.

The bundles are led from exterior/rooftop optical light collectors through small openings or cable ducts and carry the light to where it is needed. The optical fibers end in hybrid luminaires where the sunlight is joined with electric light, either on demand or to automatically maintain a constant light level even as the available sunlight decreases.

=== Transparent hollow light guides ===
A prism light guide was developed in 1981 by Lorne Whitehead, a physics professor at the University of British Columbia, and has been used in solar lighting for both the transport and distribution of light. A large solar pipe based on the same principle was set up in the narrow courtyard of a 14-floor building of a Washington, D.C. law firm in 2001, and a similar proposal has been made for London. A further system has been installed in Berlin.

The 3M company developed a system based on optical lighting film and developed the 3M light pipe, which is a light guide designed to distribute light uniformly over its length, with a thin film incorporating microscopic prisms, which has been marketed in connection with artificial light sources, e.g. sulfur lamps.

In contrast to an optical fiber which has a solid core, a prism light guide leads the light through air and is therefore referred to as a hollow light guide.

The project ARTHELIO, partially funded by the European Commission, was an investigation in years 1998 to 2000 into a system for adaptive mixing of solar and artificial light, and which includes a sulfur lamp, a heliostat, and hollow light guides for light transport and distribution.

Disney has experimented with using 3D printing to print internal light guides for illuminated toys.

=== Fluorescence based system ===
In a system developed by Fluorosolar and the University of Technology, Sydney, two fluorescent polymer layers in a flat panel capture short wave sunlight, particularly ultraviolet light, generating red and green light, respectively, which is guided into the interior of a building. There, the red and green light is mixed with artificial blue light to yield white light, without infrared or ultraviolet. This system, which collects light without requiring mobile parts such as a heliostat or a parabolic collector, is intended to transfer light to any place within a building. By capturing ultraviolet, the system can be especially effective on bright but overcast days; this is since ultraviolet is diminished less by cloud cover than are the visible components of sunlight.

== Properties and applications ==
=== Solar and hybrid lighting systems ===
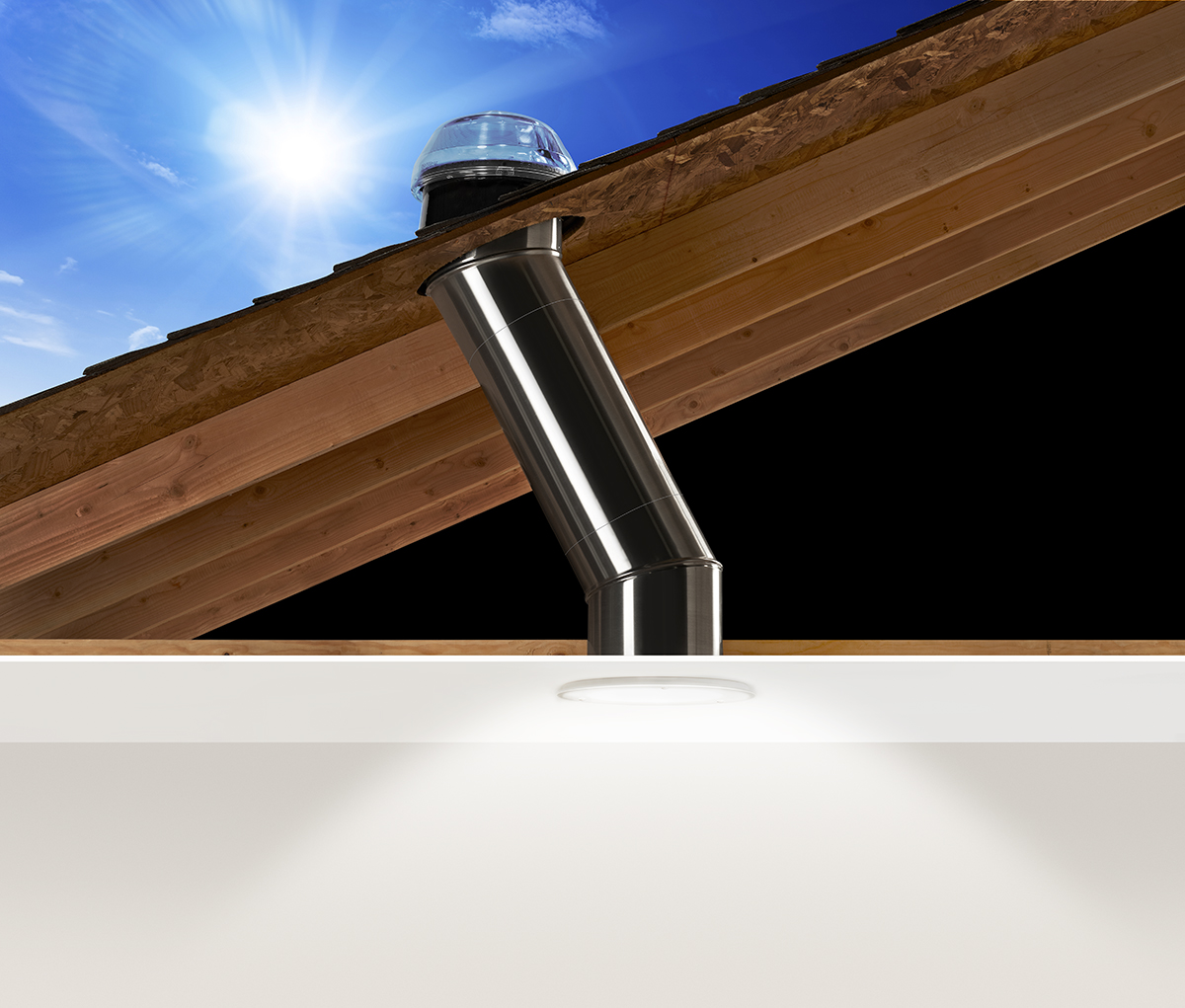
A simple light tube, showing the collection, transmission, and distribution

Solar light pipes, compared to conventional skylights and other windows, offer better heat insulation properties and more flexibility for use in inner rooms, but less visual contact with the external environment.

In the context of seasonal affective disorder, it may be worth considering that an additional installation of light tubes increases the amount of natural daily light exposure. It could thus possibly contribute to residents´ or employees´ well-being while avoiding over-illumination effects.

Compared to artificial lights, light tubes have the advantage of providing natural light and of saving energy. The transmitted light varies over the day; should this not be desired, light tubes can be combined with artificial light in a hybrid set-up.

Some artificial light sources are marketed which have a spectrum similar to that of sunlight, at least in the human visible spectrum range, as well as low flicker. Their spectrum can be made to vary dynamically such as to mimic changes in natural light over the day. Manufacturers and vendors of such light sources claim that their products can provide the same or similar health effects as natural light. When considered as alternatives to solar light pipes, such products may have lower installation costs but do consume energy during use; therefore they may well be more wasteful in terms of overall energy resources and costs.

Light tubes do not require electric installations or insulation and are thus useful for indoor wet areas such as bathrooms and pools. Speaking artistically, recent developments, especially those pertaining to transparent light tubes, open new possibilities for architectural lighting design.

=== Security applications ===
Due to the relatively small size and high light output of sun pipes, they have an ideal application to security-oriented situations, such as prisons, police cells, and other locations where restricted access is required. Being of narrow diameter, and not largely affected by internal security grilles, this provides daylight to areas without providing electrical connections or escape access, and without allowing objects to be passed into a secure area.

== In electronic devices ==
Light pipes, as they are referred to in the electronics industry, are commonly used for directing light in electronic devices.

Configurations of light pipes can vary widely, from simple, consisting of pre-made rods cut to length, to highly complex custom molded or machined shapes. Light pipes are usually made from acrylic or polycarbonate optical fibers, or solid transparent acrylic or polycarbonate polymers. Sometimes other transparent plastics are used. The source of illumination, is from LEDs on a circuit board or other internal location, to indicator symbols or buttons on the exterior of the device's enclosure.

Different colors of light can be displayed in several ways. Tinting the light pipe material, using a colored light pipe lens, or using a single color LED, are used to produce a permanent single color. Multiple colors can be displayed by using a clear light pipe with an RGB, RGBW, or RGBWW LED. Older designs have used two or more individual color LEDs routed from the indicator on the display panel to the same light pipe.

The configuration of these light pipes can vary greatly. Simpler light pipes designs may be made from a straight, cylindrical rod, or may be bent with multiple gentle curves preserving the smooth uniform shape of the cylinder walls. Alternatively a flexible optical fiber light pipe may be used. Complex designs of molded or machined configurations, commonly take on a highly elaborate shape that uses either gentle curving bends as in an optic fiber or has sharp prismatic folds which reflect off the angled corners. Multiple light pipes are often molded or machined from a single piece of plastic, permitting easy device assembly since the long thin light pipes are all part of a single rigid component that snaps into place.

Light pipe indicators make electronics cheaper to manufacture since the old way would be to mount a tiny lamp into a small socket directly behind the spot to be illuminated. This often requires extensive hand labor for installation and wiring. Light pipes permit all lights to be mounted on a single flat circuit board, but illumination can be directed up, and away from the board wherever it is required.

== In popular culture ==
- The video game franchise Portal uses light tubes to bring sunlight to the underground facility of Aperture Science to convert into hard light.
- In Neon Genesis Evangelion light tubes allow the subterranean geofront to receive sunlight.

== See also ==
- Anidolic lighting
- Daylighting
  - Active daylighting
  - Passive daylighting
- Deck prism
- Green building
- Lighting
- Liter of Light project
- Over illumination
- Passive house
- Passive solar building design
- Remote Skylights
- Prism glass
- Tubeless skylight
- Solar power, esp. the sections on solar lighting and solar design in architecture
- Zero-energy building
- Resonator
