= Alfredo Moser =

Brazilian mechanic and inventor

- Born: 1951/1952; Itajaí, Santa Catarina, Brazil
- Occupation(s): mechanic, inventor
- Known for: Moser lamp
- Spouse: Carmelinda

Alfredo Moser (1951/1952 in Itajaí) is a Brazilian mechanic, and the inventor of the solar bottle bulb, known also as the ‘Moser Lamp’, or the PET bottle lamp. His invention led to the creation of the open-source organization Liter of Light, which offers sustainable lighting to families without electricity access in numerous countries worldwide.

== Early life ==
Moser was born in rural Santa Catarina in the early 1950s and began his life working as a farmhand. He later moved to Brasília, where he worked as an auto mechanic. In 1978, he married and then moved to Minas Gerais, settling with his family in Uberaba by 1980.

== The Moser lamp ==
=== Conception ===
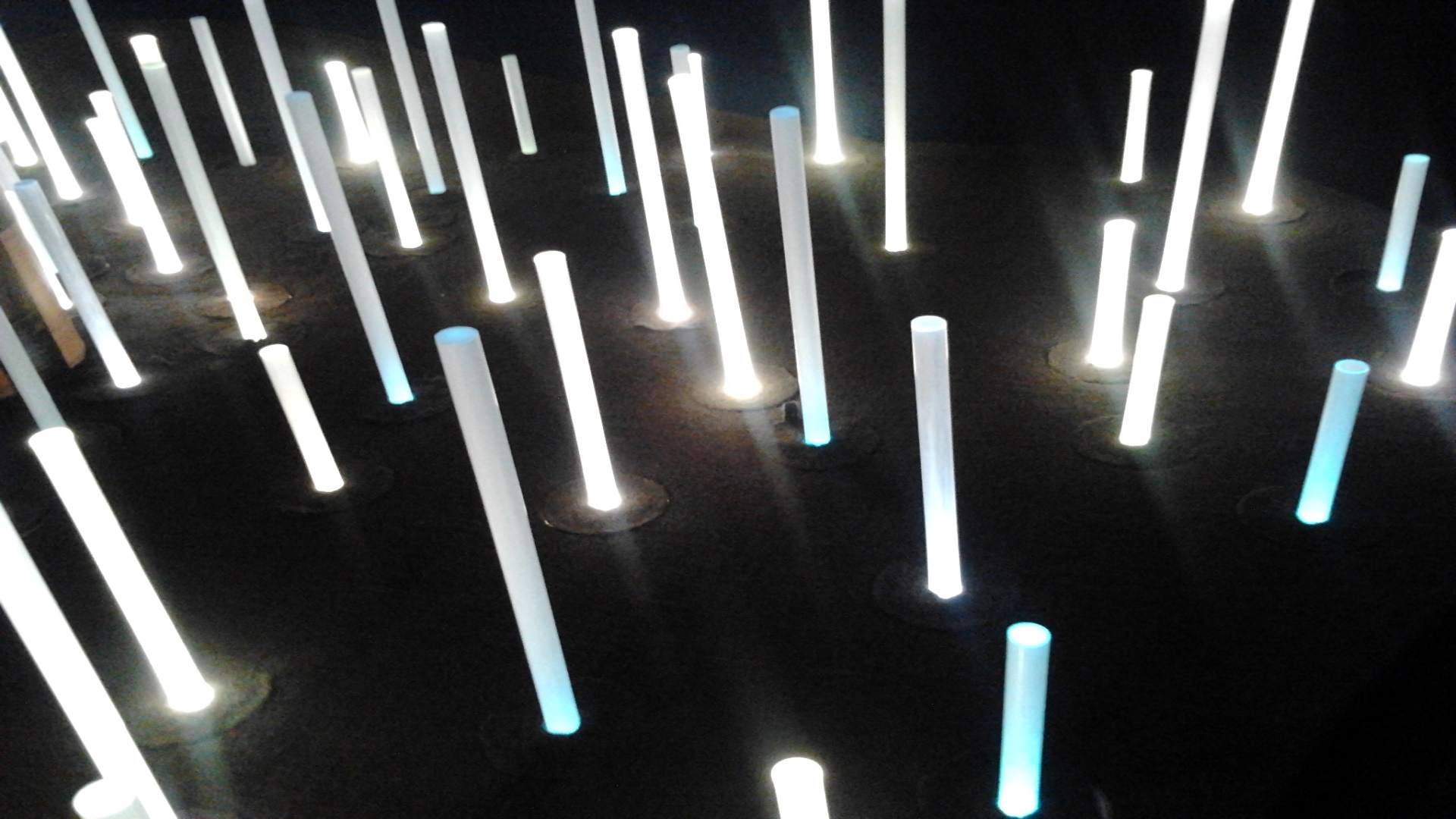
Moser lamps showcased at the Museum of Tomorrow.

According to Moser, the concept of the bottle lamp originated in the late 1970s when he was employed as a car mechanic at a telecommunications company in Brasília. He recalled discussing with his supervisor how sunlight might be used in emergency situations, which remained in his mind for years. During the 2001–2002 Brazilian energy crisis, Moser began testing water-filled plastic bottles as a do-it-yourself method to provide indoor daylight. By installing these bottles through the roofs of unlit rooms, he found that refracted sunlight could illuminate otherwise dark spaces. He later improved the design by using bleach and polyester resin.

=== Usage ===
After publicizing his invention, Moser was invited to speak at educational conferences. His invention was later adopted by open-source initiatives such as the MyShelter Foundation in the Philippines and has been replicated since 2012 through the Liter of Light project, which distributes sustainable lighting in multiple countries, benefiting communities lacking reliable access to electricity. The project has further developed a method based on Moser's original invention, utilizing solar panels to power the bulbs. These panels are used in domestic installations and to illuminate streetlights throughout the night.

In 2011, Illac Angelo Diaz, founder and executive director of the MyShelter Foundation, reported that Moser's invention was in use in approximately 140,000 homes in the Philippines alone. Additionally, residents in impoverished areas were able to cultivate crops on small hydroponic farms using the light provided by these bottle lamps. By 2014, Liter of Light had installed Moser lamps in over a million homes worldwide and expanded its reach across the Americas, Europe, Asia, and Africa by 2017.

=== Functionality ===
Moser's lamp functions without external power, using a plastic bottle filled with chlorinated water inserted into a hole in the roof. The light is refracted and scattered, providing illumination comparable to a 40 to 60 watt incandescent bulb when sunlight strikes the bottle.
