= Paul Emile Chappuis =

Paul Émile Chappuis (1816–1887) was a photographer, an inventor, and a manufacturer of daylight reflectors .

Born in Paris 1816, Chappuis moved to London, where he ran a photographic studio at 69 Fleet Street between 1859 and 1871. He also patented different types of light reflector, that would allow natural light into buildings that would otherwise require gaslights during daytime. He set up a company to manufacture reflectors in 1856 on the basis of his 1853 and 1855 patents for different types of reflectors: myriastratic or diamond-shaped, silver fluted glass, argento-crystal, and luminarium reflector. He was declared bankrupt in 1859 and briefly imprisoned for debt. However, his business recovered and was reformed as a limited company in 1868.

He died at Brixton on 20 May 1887 and was buried at West Norwood Cemetery.

Chappuis' firm continued manufacturing reflectors in London until the factory was destroyed by bombing in 1943.

== See also ==
- Light tube
