= National Axe Throwing Federation =

Global Organization

- Website: www.nationalaxe.com

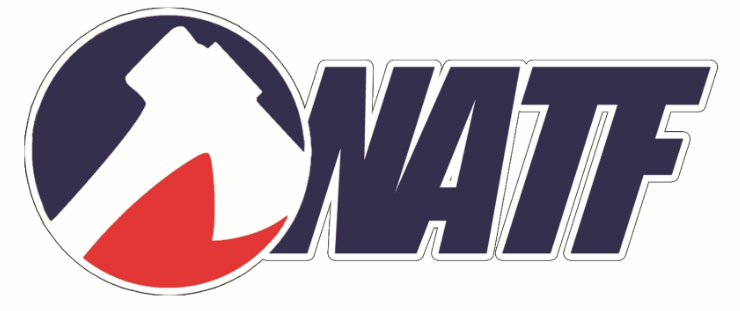
National Axe Throwing Federation (NATF)

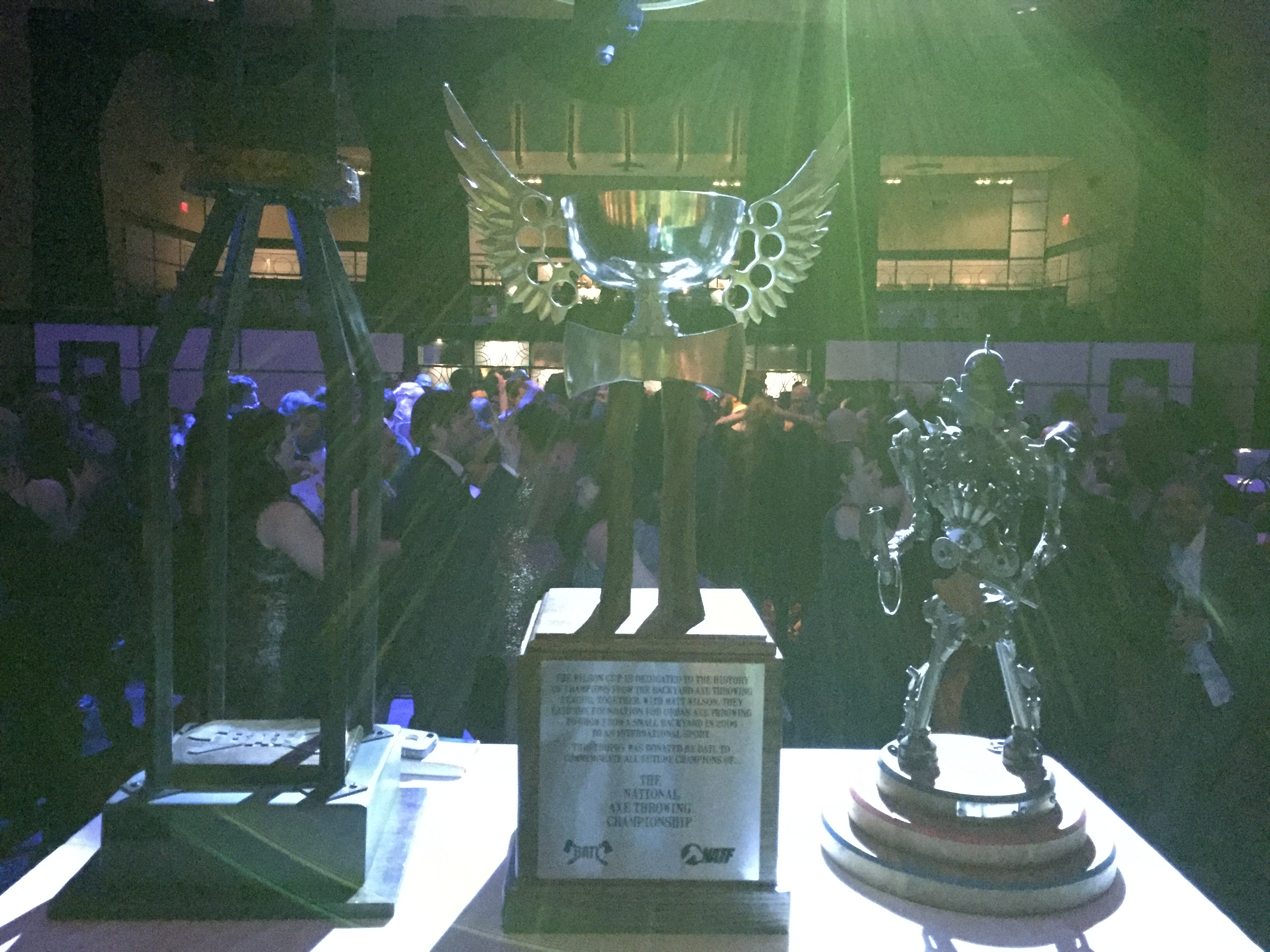
The Wilson Cup (center), awarded annually to the winner of the National Axe Throwing Championship.

Originally established in Canada as the "Champions League" from 2012 through 2016 under the Backyard Axe Throwing League, the National Axe Throwing Federation (NATF) became its own organization in 2017 to promote and regulate the sport of axe throwing and allow other axe throwing companies to join. Then in 2019, it restructured the brand to become the International Axe Throwing Federation (IATF) to reflect its global aspirations in which it is still named today.

IATF has over 20,000 competitive throwers. Its leagues culminate in the International Axe Throwing Championship (IATC) to award the Wilson Cup and over $16,500 in prize money and charitable donation.

== Scoring ==
Scoring in axe-throwing includes a three-round match system where five axes are thrown per round. The first player to win two of three rounds wins. Scoring is determined by where on the target the axe strikes.

The targets under NATF have a black bullseye ring, followed by a red ring, and then a blue ring. The scoring is 5, 3, and 1 point respectively. Additionally, there are green dots in the corner, known as “Clutch,” and must be called in advance during the final throw of a match (worth 7 points). Point designation is based on where the majority of the blade lands and sticks.

== Current Member Organizations ==
- ABQ Axe
- Axe Club of America
- Axe Factor Singapore
- Axe Kickers
- Axe Nation
- Axt Axe Throwing
- Backyard Axe Throwing League (BATL)
- Bare Axe Throwing
- Bounce Milwaukee (Fling Milwaukee)
- Bullseye Axe Throwing
- Cascadia Axe Company
- Chill Axe Throwing
- Chopper's Hatchet House
- Civil Axe Throwing
- Detroit Axe
- Flying Timber Axe Throwing
- Forged Axe Throwing
- Game of Axes
- Golden Axe Throw Club
- Half Axe
- Kraken Axes
- LA AX
- Axe Club of America
- LumberJaxes
- Lumberjaxs Axe Throwing (Tamworth UK)
- Lumber Punks Axe Throwing (Gold Coast, Brisbane, Perth & Melbourne - Australia)
- Maniax Axe Throwing
- Mazhu Axes
- Meduseld Meadery
- Northern Axperts
- Peterborough Axe Club
- Primitive Axe
- Rage Academy
- Riot Axe
- Skeeters Axe Club (London, UK)
- Timber Lounge Halifaxe
- The Axe Shack (Bridgwater, UK)
- Tomahawks Axe Throwing
- Total Axe Throwing
- True North Axe Throwing
- UberWarrior Closed
- Urban Axes
- Valhalla Indoor Axe Throwing
- Valhalla North Axe Throwing (Durham, UK)
- Warriors Axe Throwing

== National Axe Throwing Championship ==
The axe throwing league calendar culminates at the National Axe Throwing Championship (NATC), where league players compete for the Wilson Cup. The NATC takes place in two stages of competition in January and February of each year. The final stage takes place during the annual All-Star Weekend, together with other axe throwing events including the Winter Skillz competition and the Axe Prom dinner and awards ceremony.

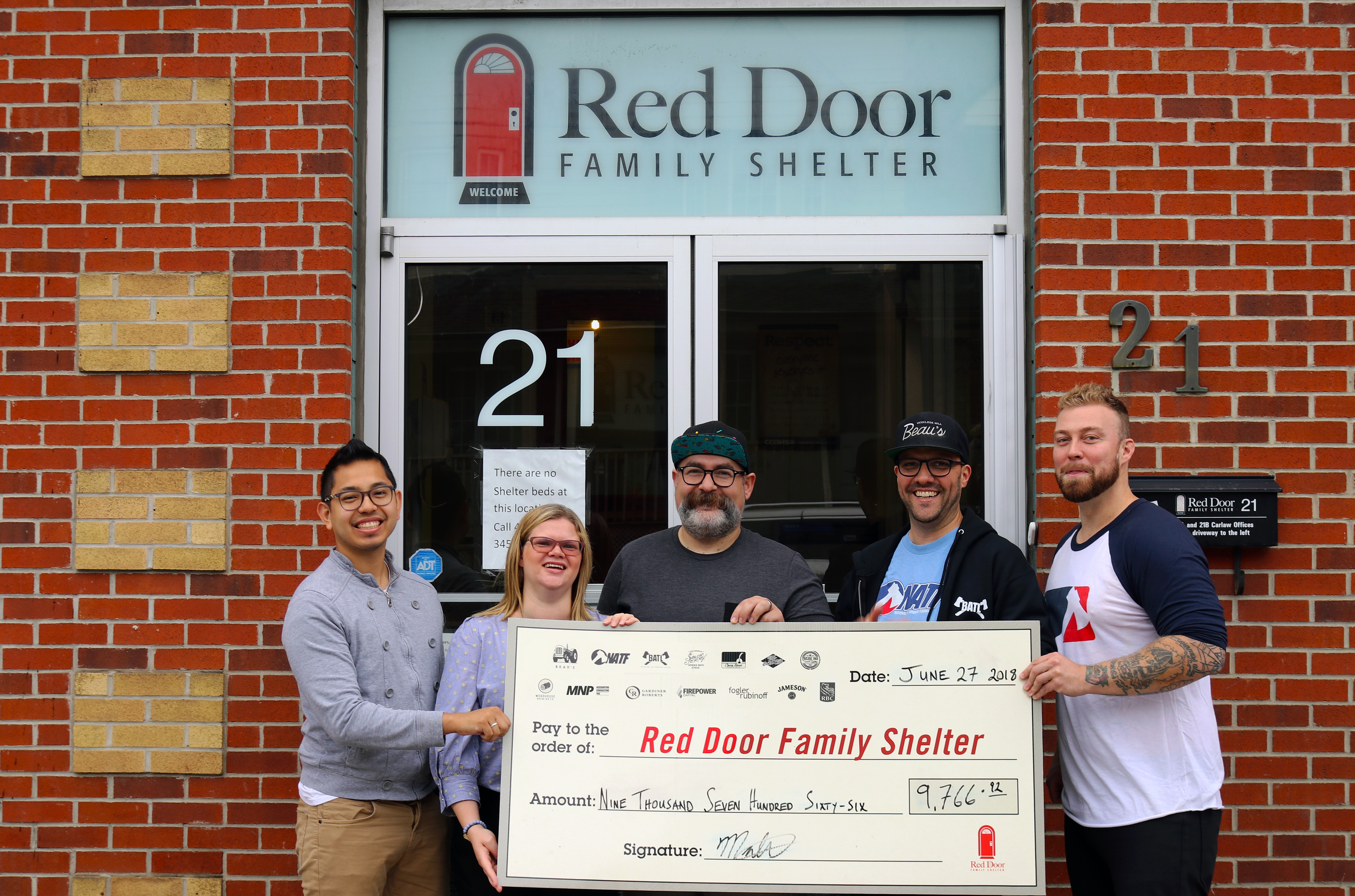
The Red Door Family Shelter Donation

== Charitable Support ==
The 2018 All-Star Weekend was presented by Beau's All Natural Brewing Co. The NATC tournament helped to raise proceeds of $9,766.92 for donation to the Red Door Family Shelter.

== NATC Winners ==
Winners of the NATC are awarded the Wilson Cup, which is named after the NATF's Commissioner, Matt Wilson. Wilson and some friends pioneered the sport in 2006.

- 2017-19 Straun Riley - Backyard Axe Throwing League
- 2016-17 Stefan Herda - Backyard Axe Throwing League

From 2012 - 2016 the National Axe Throwing Championship was known as the annual Champions League tournament for eligible competitors from the Backyard Axe Throwing League. Past Champions League winners include:

- 2013-16 Stefan Herda
- 2012-13 Jari Salovaara
- 2011-12 Dave Michna

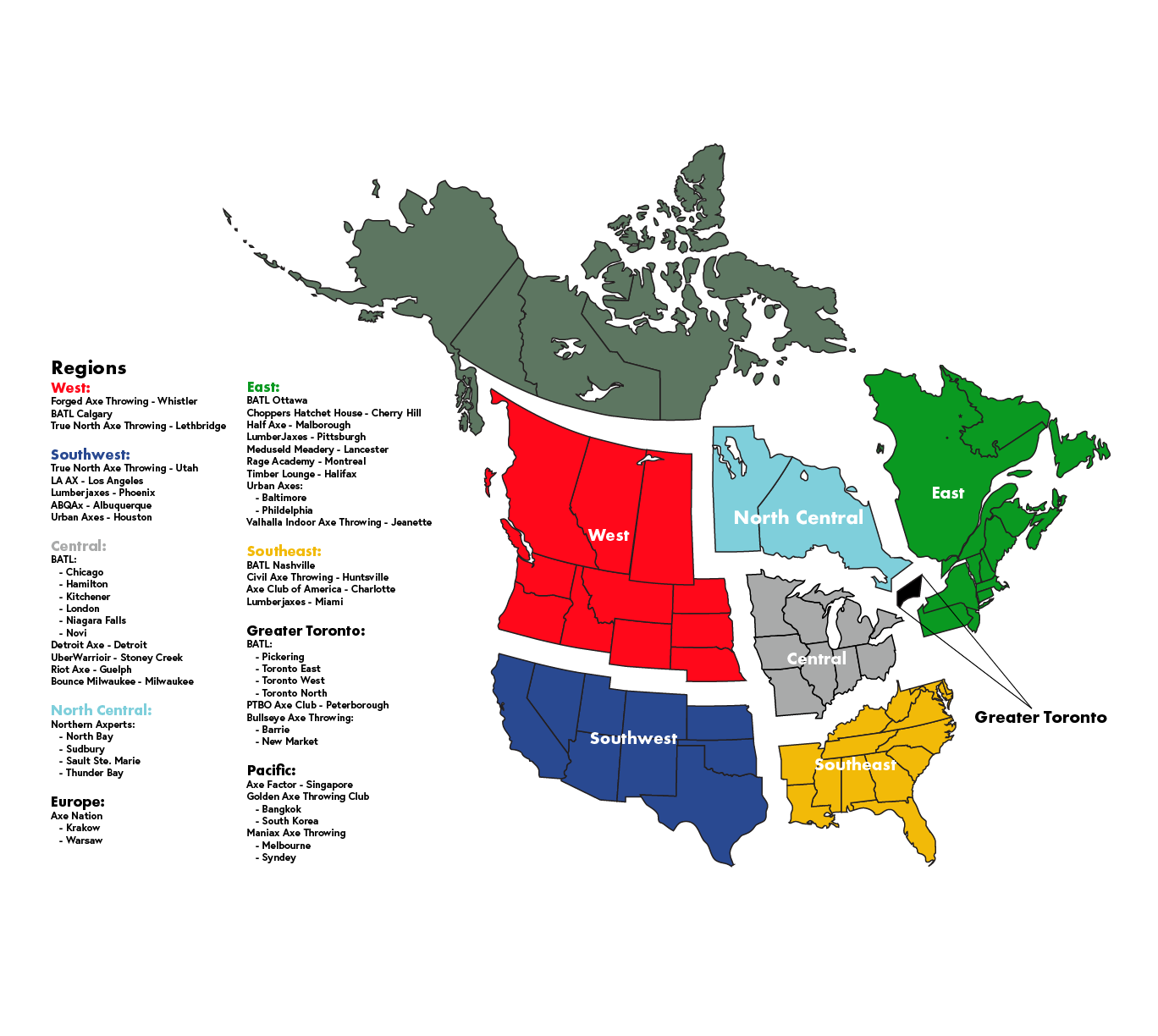
NATF Competitive Regions

== NATF Competitive Regions ==
The NATF consists of seven North American regions and one International region to support local axe throwing competition.

== History ==
The National Axe Throwing Federation was founded in 2016 by Matt Wilson and COO, Brian Simmons, from BATL.
