= Remote Skylights =

Remote Skylights are optical systems capable of providing natural light to unlit locations. An arrangement of parabolic reflectors and optical fiber cables, transport natural sunlight to areas that would otherwise be dark or be lit artificially.

Remote skylights are composed chiefly of a solar collection dish, a "heliotube" and a distribution dish. The collection and distribution dishes are both parabolic reflectors. The collection dish is connected to a heliostat, a mechanism which tracks the transit of the sun across the sky, so as to maximize the intensity of light falling upon it. The heliotube is a fiber light tube, a bundle of optical fibers that channel the collected sunlight from the collection dish to the distribution dish. Unlike a typical skylight, the heliotube allows the two dishes to be in different places.

Remote Skylights were invented by RAAD studio in order to provide natural illumination to the proposed Lowline underground park.

== Benefits ==
Remote Skylights provide two key advantages over artificial illumination:

1. The transported light contains the frequencies necessary for photosynthesis. (Though it is reported that harmful UV rays are filtered out.)
2. No power is required to sustain the illumination. This means that (after construction) no harmful greenhouse gases are produced.

== See also ==
- Light tube
