= Axe throwing =

Throwing axes at targets as a sport

Axe throwing in slow motion

The modern sport of axe throwing involves a competitor throwing an axe at a target, either for fun or competition. As of the autumn of 2024, there are commercial locations and club-based throwing ranges in all continents, although predominantly in North America and Europe, as well as mobile axe throwing opportunities at events and festivals, and at some theme parks.

== History ==
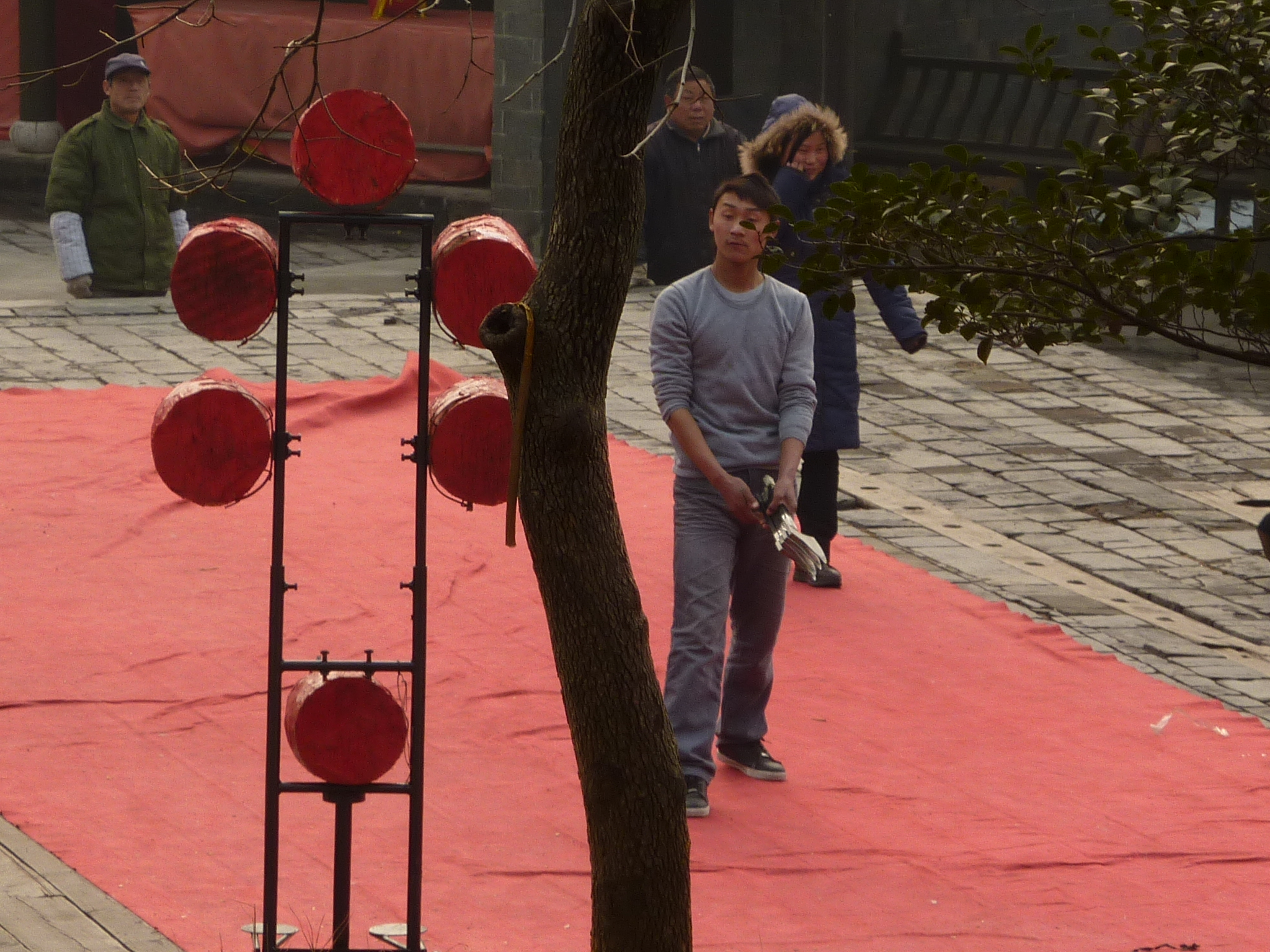
Axe throwing at the Ming Culture Village, a theme park near the Yangshan Quarry, China

Historically, there are some references to axe throwing in war by the Franks, and the use of throwing tomahawks by the Algonquian native Americans in North America. Axe throwing, notably throwing large double-bit (double bladed) felling axes has sometimes featured in lumberjack or woodsman competitions, although it is not core component of such competitions. Double bit axe throwing for competition is mostly associated with the Global Axe Throwing Commission (GAC). Axe or tomahawk throwing was also associated with knife throwing and "Wild West" entertainers throughout the 20th century, which inspired knife and axe hobby throwing throughout Europe and North America.

Throughout the early 21st century, these hobby throwers began to form clubs, establish ranges, and organise competitions. In North America, the International Knife Throwers Hall of Fame (IKTHOF) was the first to declare world champions in both knife and axe throwing. In Europe, the EuroThrowers throwing club also organised world championships and other international meetings, helping to draw axe and knife throwers together from: Russia, Czech Republic, France, Great Britain, Germany, Slovakia, Poland, Hungary, Italy, Switzerland, Canada, Finland, Latvia, Sweden, and the USA. Typically, this club-based style of throwing is held out of doors, throwing tomahawks at slices or round of tree trunk, end-grain on.

The contemporary widespread phenomenon of axe throwing as a social activity has been tied to the formation of the Backyard Axe Throwing League, which was started in the backyard of the founder, Matt Wilson, in 2006. The Backyard Axe Throwing League (BATL) organisation opened their first commercial axe throwing venue in Sterling Street, Toronto in 2011 and then a second in Villiers Street, in the Toronto Port Lands in 2013, which still operates today. This style of axe throwing typically uses small hatchets, often custom made for throwing, thrown at targets on plank or end-grain boards within an indoor space, such as an ex-warehouse or retail unit.

Other similar axe throwing venues were launched by other organisations such as Bad Axe Throwing, which opened its first venue in Burlington, Canada in 2014. From Canada, axe throwing spread to the USA in 2016, and then worldwide. Popularisation of the sport worldwide was helped by the formation of the International Axe Throwing Federation (IATF), formerly known as NATF, in 2016, by BATL, and then the formation of the World Axe Throwing League (WATL) by various axe throwing companies, led by Bad Axe Throwing.

As the axe throwing industry grew from the 2010s onwards, various types of venues sprung up. Some adhered to the WATL and IATF rules and stuck firmly to running competitive leagues. Others developed games software that was projected on to the targets and offered a more social environment, often accompanied by selling food and drink.

== Hazards ==
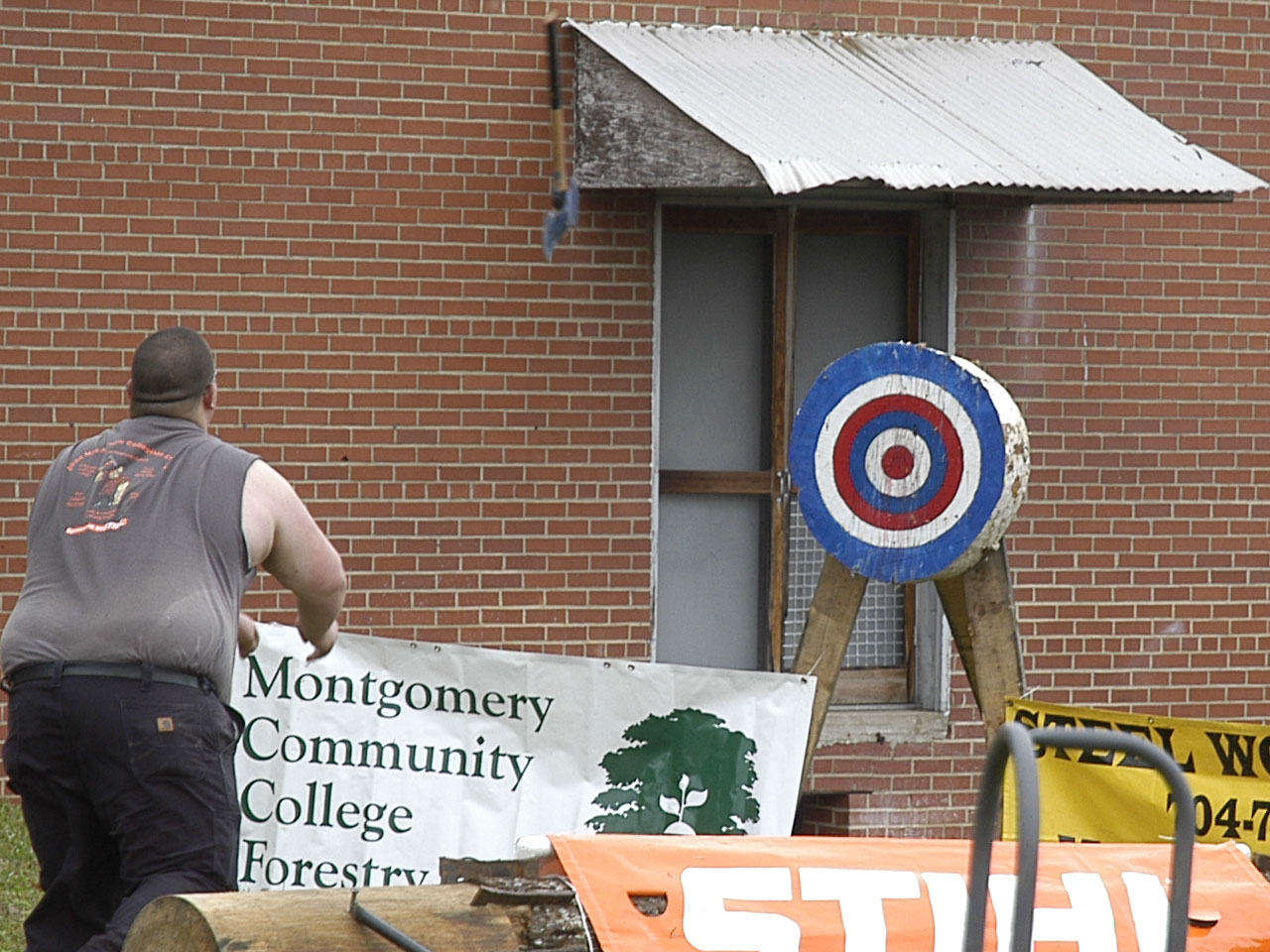
Axe throwing (Lexington Barbecue Festival)

The sport of axe throwing deals with a dangerous weapon, so the throwing area must be kept safe at all times. Axe throwing has the possibility to cause serious injury or even death. If there is an open area behind the target, then spectators and others should be plainly prevented from walking into that area. The target area should be taped off using flags or light fencing materials. A first aid kit and a person trained in first aid and CPR should be at hand in the event of an emergency. For competition in rural and remote areas, the GPS location for the event should be reported in the case of first responders being needed.

== Organisations ==
=== World Axe Throwing League ===
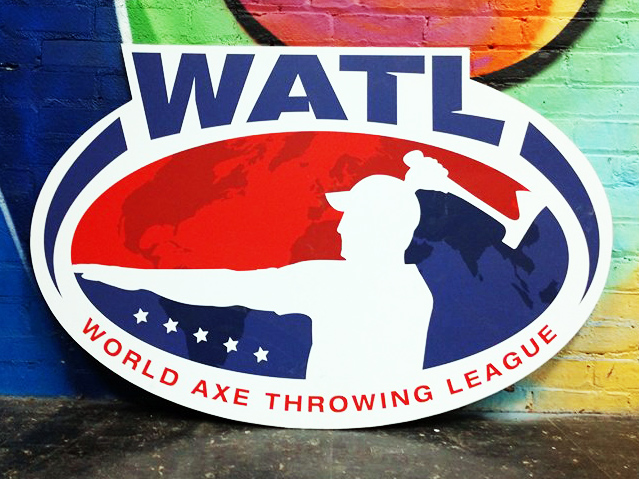
World Axe Throwing League Logo from 2017

Founded in 2017, the World Axe Throwing League (WATL) is the largest global governing body of urban axe throwing and exists to promote axe throwing as a professional sport by bringing together axe throwing clubs. As of 2024 the league has boasted having over 20,000 competitors annually all around the world.

With members from over 300 member companies (affiliates), the World Axe Throwing League standardises the sport of axe throwing by overseeing official WATL league rules, implementing safety protocols, staff training, and facilitating the World Axe Throwing Championships.

=== International Axe Throwing Federation ===
International Axe Throwing Federation (IATF) Founded in 2012 originally as the Backyard Axe Throwing League (BATL), is credited as starting urban axe throwing in major cities. In 2017 BATL premiered the National Axe Throwing Federation (NATF) allowing other axe throwing venues to join their league. In 2019 they rebranded to the International Axe Throwing Federation which is currently the second largest Axe Throwing organisation with 150+ member clubs featuring 5,000+ competitors internationally. Six countries are members in 2025.

=== Eurothrowers ===
The European Throwing Club Flying Blades (EuroThrowers) is an umbrella association for non-commercial axe throwing sports clubs in Europe. With more than 250 direct members from 15 countries, it standardises the competition rules for Europe, which are adhered to by its more than 25 member clubs. The annual World Knife Throwing and Axe Throwing Championship takes place in a different country each year.

== Rules ==
Depending on the type of league, there are different boards and scoring, but the board needs to be made of wood. Generally the wood for axe throwing targets is cottonwood, poplar wood or pine wood. IATF targets have 4 zones: 3 main and 1 extra – the clutch. WATL targets have 5 main zones and 1 extra.

The distance of the throwing line to the target should be around 3.7 m (12 ft) to allow the axe to rotate only once, but every league has its own rules for games, distance, board and even axes. For example, when playing IATF classic league matches, the majority of the blade in the board counts but in the WATL it is enough to touch the line to have a point. Matches of both leagues are individual. The common rule is that thrower must not step over the throwing line before the axe hits or misses the target; a thrower who steps over the line gets 0 points. Before the competition, a special target for practise throws must be made available. Throwers practising on the competition target will be disqualified from the competition. There are also championships in other games or trick shots.

There are two main sizes of axes used in the leagues: small (600 and 800 g (21 and 28 oz)) for normal rounds and big (1 and 1.5 kg (2.2 and 3.3 lb)) for "tiebreakers". Weights previously written apply only to the blade. The rules of IATF allow playing only axes with wooden handles; WATL does not have any restrictions.

== See also ==
- Knife throwing
- Hammer throw
- Lumberjack World Championship
