= Daylight redirecting film =

Plastic applied to window to reflect light

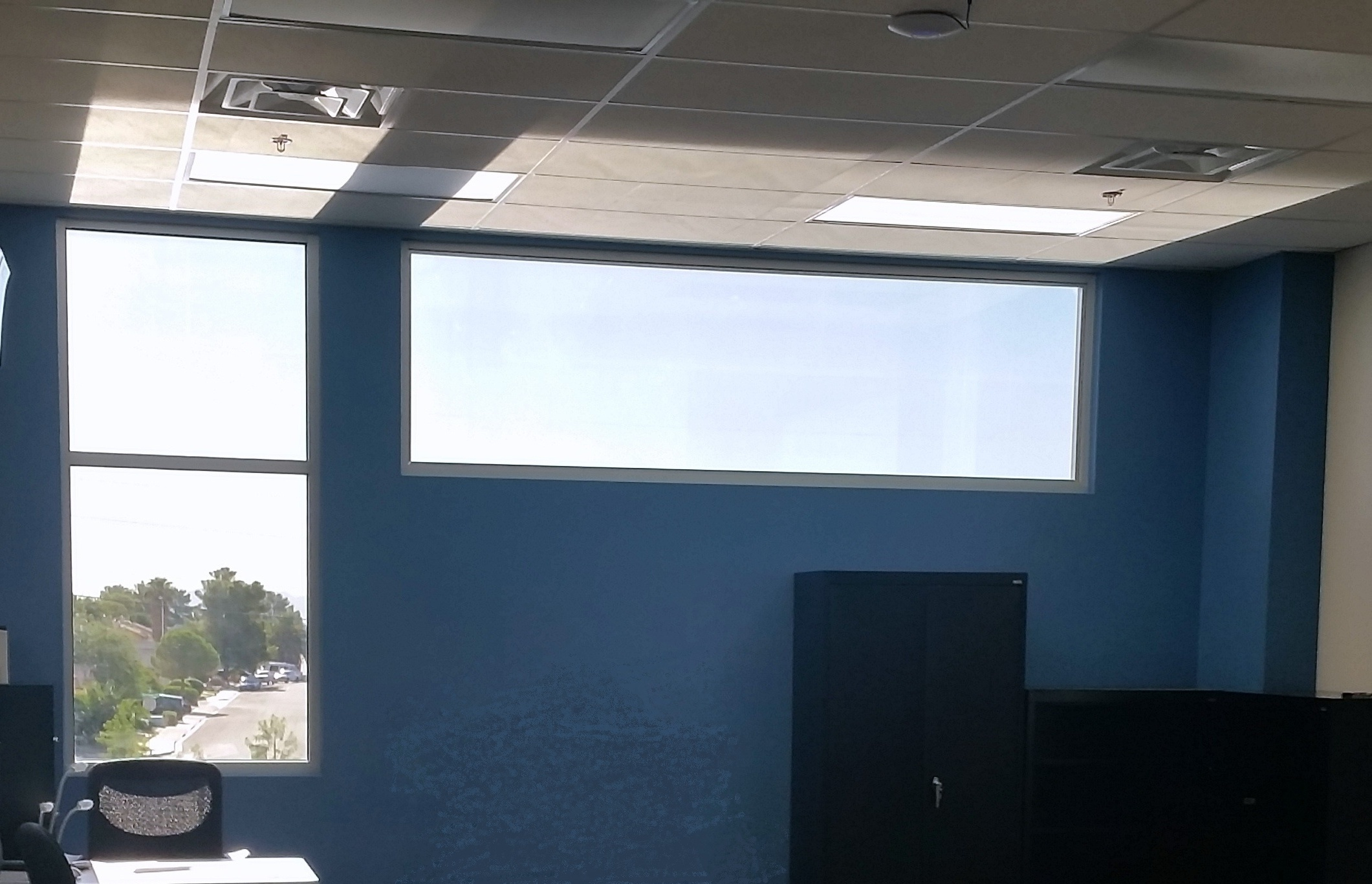
The reflection-based daylight redirecting film, stuck to the inside of top part of the windows, is reflecting light sharply up onto the ceiling. This is a suboptimal use of prism lighting. While the ceiling does diffuse the reflected light, it still mostly lights the area nearest the window, where it is superfluous. However, glare is reduced without reducing the amount of daylight in a room.

Daylight redirecting film (DRF) is a thin, flexible plastic film which can be applied to a window to refract or reflect incoming light upwards so that the deeper parts of the room are lit more evenly. It can be used as a substitute for opaque blinds. It is a form of prism lighting.

== Function ==
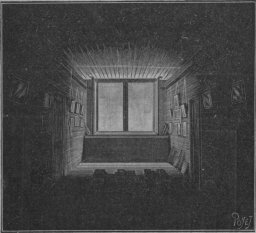
Uneven light from a window.

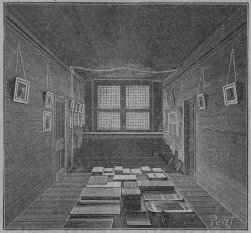
The same light, redistributed by prism tiles in the window.

The human eye's response to light is non-linear: halving the light level does not halve the perceived brightness of a space, it makes it look only slightly dimmer. If light is redistributed from the brightest parts of a room to the dimmest, the room therefore appears brighter overall, and more space can be given a useful and comfortable level of illumination (see before and after images from an 1899 article, left). This can reduce the need for artificial lighting.

Refraction and total internal reflection inside optical prisms can bend beams of light. This bending of the light allows it to be redistributed. The prism structure only bends light appropriately at certain angles; if the angle of incoming light changes, a variety of prisms or a movable prism awning may be needed.

While the films do save energy from lighting, the savings vary substantially by climate, aspect, electricity costs, and existing lighting type. At 2014 costs, including labour, payback time may be measured in decades.

Window films are also used for cooling and heating energy saving, and to block UV.

== Manufacture ==
Daylight redirecting film is made of acrylic on a flexible polyester backing, one side coated with a pressure-sensitive adhesive (to make it peel-and-stick).

There are two types of film. Some film is moulded with tiny triangular prisms, making a flexible peel-and-stick miniature prismatic panel. The prisms are joined at the edges into a sheet. A prism sheet is somewhat like a linear Fresnel lens, but each ridge may be identical. Unlike a Fresnel lens, the light is not intended to be focused but used for anidolic lighting.

Another film is moulded with thin near-horizontal voids protruding into or through the acrylic; the slits reflect light hitting their top surfaces upwards. Refraction is minimized, to avoid colouring the light.

The slit-based films are more transparent (both are translucent), but when the sun is high, they tend to send the light up at the ceiling, not deeper into the room. Prism-based films are translucent rather than transparent, but offer finer control over the direction of the outgoing light beam; the film can be made in a variety of prism shapes to refract light by a variety of angles. Prism-based films are a lighter modern version of glass prism tiles.

Daylight redirecting window film was initially made of one redirecting film and one glare-reducing diffusing film, often located on different interior surfaces of a double-glazed window, but integrated single films are now available.

== See also ==
- Prism lighting
- Window film
