= World Axe Throwing League =

International Sporting League

World Axe Throwing League (WATL)
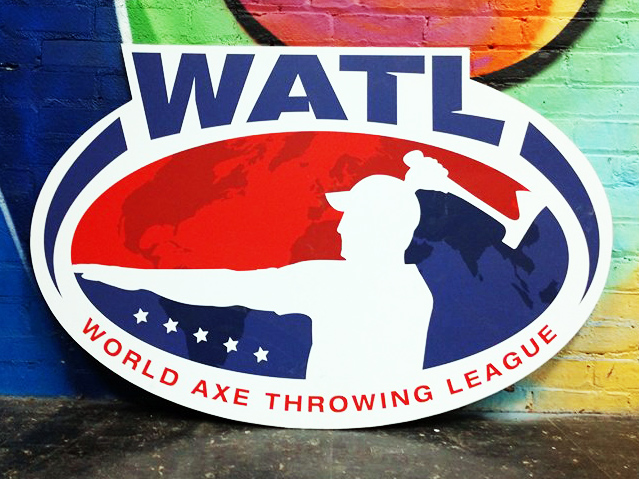
- Sport: Axe throwing
- Founded: January 2017 (9 years ago)
- First season: Spring 2017
- Commissioner: Mario Zelaya
- Countries: 24
- Headquarters: Burlington, Ontario, Canada
- Most recent champion: Mark Tennant
- Website: worldaxethrowingleague.com

The World Axe Throwing League (WATL) is a global governing body of urban axe throwing.

WATL was founded in 2017 by representatives from Canada, the United States, Brazil, and Ireland. It has 19 axe throwing nations with membership. Members include over 200 member companies (affiliates). It organizes international tournament events such as the U.S. Open, Canadian Open, European Open, the North American Arnold Open, South American Arnold Open, and most notably the World Axe Throwing Championship.

It appoints judges who officiate at all sanctioned leagues and tournaments. It promulgates the WATL Code of Conduct, which sets professional standards of discipline for urban axe throwing.

== International Axe Throwing Day ==
This day (13 June) was created by the World Axe Throwing League to celebrate, raise awareness and unify the sport of urban axe throwing. Though primarily celebrated with affiliates in WATL, it is also celebrated by anyone with a passion for the sport around the world.

== History ==
=== 2017 ===
- WATL was founded.
- International Axe Throwing Day (June 13) was founded.
- Representatives from five countries joined the WATL: the United States, Canada, Ireland, Brazil and Denmark.
- The first annual World Axe Throwing Championship was held.

=== 2018 ===
- Evan Walters was announced as the Commissioner of WATL.
- Representatives from 10 countries joined the WATL: the United Kingdom, Turkey, Russia, Spain, the Netherlands, Hungary, Poland, New Zealand, Slovenia, and Indonesia.
- The first annual U.S. Open tournament was held.
- The second annual World Axe Throwing Championship was held, and was the first urban axe throwing production to be featured on ESPN.

=== 2019 ===
- Representatives from four countries joined the WATL: South Africa, Australia, Belgium and China.
- The first Canadian Open tournament was held.

=== 2020 ===
- The spring and summer leagues for 2020 were cancelled as a result of the global COVID-19 pandemic. Due to the pandemic and many locations around the world enforcing a quarantine, the WATL helped establish the Quarantine Axe Throwing League with co-founders Gavin Caissie, Mike Morton. This made headway continuing the sport from the homes of players, so they might continue axe throwing despite the mandatory restrictions on social contact.
- WATL implemented a new style of playing online with WATL Live.
- WATL founder Mario Zelaya was announced as the new Commissioner of the World Axe Throwing League starting in 2021, and Evan Walters became Head of Development for the World Knife Throwing League.

=== 2021 ===
- With COVID-19 restrictions lessened around the world, Axe Throwing League seasons reopened for standard League play.
- The first affiliated location in India started.
- The World Axe Throwing League announced the formation of a new sister league, the World Knife Throwing League.
- At the 2021 World Axe Throwing Championship, Mario Zelaya announced he would be stepping down as Commissioner, with Mike Morton to be his replacement.

=== 2023 ===
- Mike Morton announced he would be stepping down as Commissioner, with Sarah Sed to be his replacement starting in January 2024.
- In 2023 it was announced that the World Axe Throwing League and World Knife Throwing League were replacing the annual U.S. Open tournament with a Pro-Am tournament.

=== 2024 ===
- The 7th World Axe Throwing Championship was held in Tulsa, Oklahoma.
- The WATL launched new programs including the Mentorship Program and Content Initiative.
- The WATL Rating System was launched.
- The first Amateur Championships was held in Atlanta, Georgia.

=== 2025 ===
- The 8th World Axe Throwing Championship was held in Appleton, Wisconsin.
- The WATL launched new programs including Community Venues & Flex Leagues.
- The 2nd Amateur Championships was announced to occur in 2026 with the World Axe & Knife Throwing Championships.
- Mario Zelaya returned as Commissioner, replacing Sarah Sed.

=== 2026 ===
- The 9th World Axe Throwing Championship was held in Tulsa, Oklahoma.

== Scoring ==
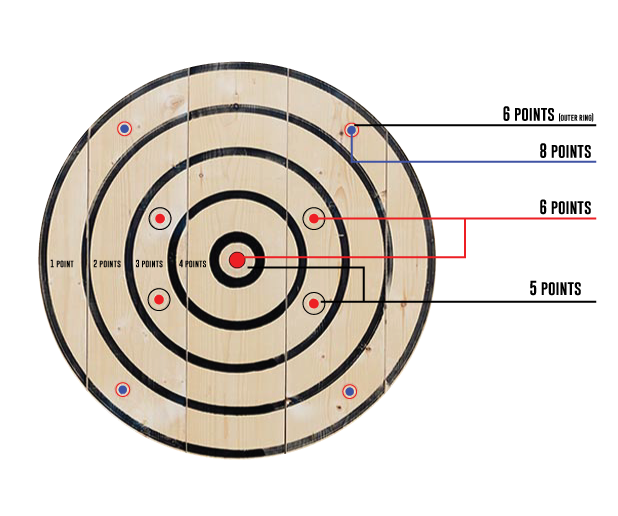
A standard axe throwing target design to compete in the World Axe Throwing League in 2024

Scoring is a match system where ten axes are thrown per match. The player with the highest points of their ten thrown axes wins the match. In case of a tie, a "sudden death" throw is made for the highest score. Sudden death throws are done until one thrower scores higher than the other. Scoring is determined by where the axe strikes into the target. The WATL targets have a red bullseye ring, followed by five empty rings, and then a blue ring. The scoring is 6, 5, 4, 3, 2, and 1 point respectively. Additionally, there are blue dots in the 1 point ring, known as "kill-shot," which can only be used when called, twice per match for 7 or 8 points. Point designation is based on the highest point value the axe touches when it lands and sticks.

== WATL tournaments ==
In 2018, WATL started working on a tournament format to help include any throwers who could not regularly participate in the WATL axe throwing seasons. This started off by working with a local axe throwing facility in Columbus, Ohio, for the Arnold Sports Festival (also known as the Arnold Classic or just "the Arnold", and named after Arnold Schwarzenegger). As of 2024 WATL has worked with its affiliated axe throwing locations on a tournament circuit where there are dozens of axe throwing tournaments held internationally. These tournaments help players earn spots to the World Axe Throwing Championship just as leagues do.

WATL still directly hosts an annual World Axe Throwing Championship, and typically one other tournament as well, that has varied in name and format over the years.

US Open results
Year	Champion	Location	2nd place
2018	(United States) John Bradley	(United States) Chicago, Illinois	(United States) Eric Enriquez
2019	(United States) Mike Kump	(United States) Des Moines, Iowa	(United States) Sam Carter
2020	Canceled	Canceled	Canceled
2021	(United States) Mike Philabaum	(United States) Atlanta, Georgia	(United States) Michael Theadorou
2022	(United States) Mark Tishko	(United States) Minneapolis, Minnesota	(United States) Lucas Johnson

In 2023 the World Axe Throwing League discontinued the U.S Open in favor of re-branding it as the Pro-Am Championship. This tournament was made to highlight professional throwers as well as amateur ones, in addition to introducing many new styles of gameplay for axe and knife throwing, known as the Skills Challenges.

Pro-Am results
Year	Pro Hatchet Champion	Amateur Hatchet Champion	Location
2023	(United States) Brett Jariabek	(United States) Erik Rimblas	(United States) Appleton, Wisconsin

In 2024 the World Axe Throwing League decided to focus on the amateur competitors with its tournament and rebranded the Pro-Am to the Amateur Championship. The Amateur Championship is aimed at giving newer players a way to experience a higher level of competition without the higher stakes of a World Champion title attached, but with the ability to earn a spot at the World Axe Throwing Championship.

Amateur Championship results
Year	Amateur Hatchet Champion	Location
2024	(United States) Tommy Runkel	(United States) Atlanta, Georgia
2025	(United States) Trevor Weaver	(United States) Tulsa, Oklahoma

== World Axe Throwing Hatchet Championship ==
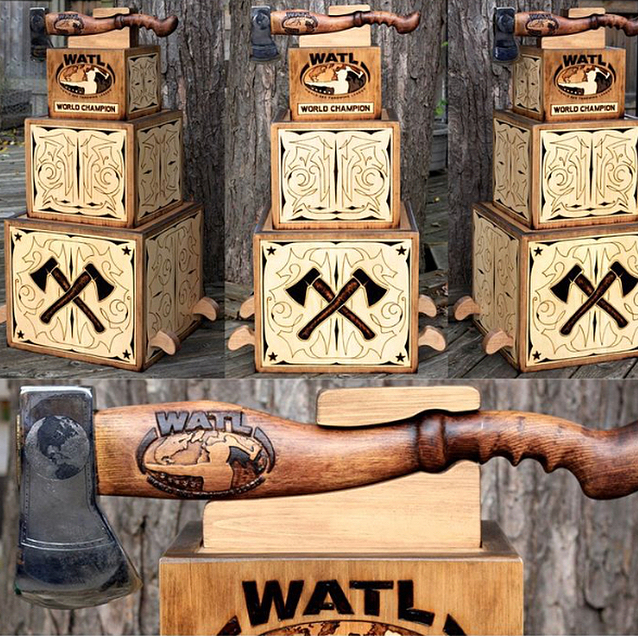
World Axe Throwing Championship trophy, 2017-2021

The World Axe Throwing Championship takes place once a year. The format has slight changes from year to year, to be announced before the beginning of the yearly competition. 2018 marked the first time that an axe throwing championship was presented on ESPN.

Axe Throwing World Champions
Year	World Champion	Location represented	Country	2nd place	3rd place
2017	Chris Morning	Far Shot Recreation	Canada	Jon Miller	Michael Moore
2018	Benjamin Edgington	Bad Axe Throwing Denver	United States	David Cycon	Paul Gammon
2019	Sam Carter	Tap That Axe Throwing	United States	David Cycon	Straun Riley
2020	Ryan Smit	Tribal Axe	United States	Mike Kump	Nick Rich
2021	Mike Philabaum	Mountain Man Axe Throwing	United States	Garrett Gneiting	Robert Young
2022	Dylan Teets	Axe On Axe Off	United States	Colby Dean	Lucas Johnson / Mike Philabaum
2023	Garrett Gneiting	Social Axe Throwing	United States	Neil Rust	Dave Alviso / Lucas Johnson
2024	Dylan Teets	Swamp Axe	United States	Nick Kolomyja	Justin Reese / Lucas Johnson
2025	Mark Tennant	Shenandoah Valley Axe Throwing	United States	Neil Rust	Joe Devine / Jayden Thompson

=== Duals World Champions ===
The World Axe Throwing Championship added duals as a discipline in 2019. Duals is when two throwers are working together as a team to throw a combined score.

Duals Champions
Year	World Champions	Locations represented	2nd place	3rd place
2019	Uncle Kump - Mike Kump and Will Gelatko	Chopper's Hatchet House	Team Basura - Julio Romero and Rander Marquez	Stjep Daddy - Stjepan Rihtaric and Gavin Caissie
2020	Brown Johnson - Lucas Johnson and Hayden Brown	Murfreesboro Axe	Trigger Happy - John Hout and Shane Sheppard	Valkyrian Steel - Joshua Russo and Zach Crawford
2021	Brown Johnson - Lucas Johnson and Hayden Brown	Murfreesboro Axe	Kingsmen - Michael Theodorou and Colby Dean	Axe Mafia - Ronnie Patterson and David Gann
2022	Brown Johnson - Lucas Johnson and Hayden Brown	Murfreesboro Axe	Vinnit to Win it - Vin Crescenzo and Kyle Durrant	Sloth Ghost / Fancy but Loose
2023	Flo Bros - John Doepke and Tyler Flynn	Blades & Boards / TimberBeast Axe Throwing	Kill Shot Crew - Tyler Hunt and Brett Jariabek	Brown Johnson / Team Jacob
2024	Devine Johnson - Lucas Johnson and Joe Devine	Lumberjack Johnny's	Flo Bros - John Doepke and Tyler Flynn	Daddy and the Boy / Kill Shot Crew
2025	Republic Chophouse - Lucas Johnson and Joe Devine	Lumberjack Johnny's	When Quality Matters - Alex Everson and Logan Keehn	Nightrunners / Kill Shot Crew

=== Big Axe Championship ===
The World Axe Throwing Championship added Big Axe as a discipline eligible for a Championship title in 2020. Big Axe is similar to Hatchet, but the axe is much larger and often thrown with two hands.

Big Axe Champions
Year	World Champion	Location represented	Country	2nd place	3rd place
2020	Zach Crawford	TimberBeast Axe Throwing	United States	Jonathan Morgan	Marcus Brown
2021	Mark Mirasol	The Lazy Axe	United States	Joshua Russo	Tyler Flynn / Mike Philabaum
2022	Lucas Johnson	Murfreesboro Axe	United States	Tyler Flynn	Manny Kohl / Nick Kolomyja
2023	Dylan Teets	Swamp Axe	United States	Jonathan Morgan	Lucas Johnson / Dustin Wellman
2024	Lucas Johnson	Lumberjack Johnny's	United States	Dylan Teets	Tyler Flynn / Neil Rust
2025	Lucas Johnson	Lumberjack Johnny's	United States	Tyler Flynn	John Doepke / Eli Morton

== Commissioners of the World Axe Throwing League ==
The Commissioner of WATL heads the World Axe Throwing League.

WATL Commissioners
Years active	Name	Country
2018 – 2021	Evan Walters	United States
2021 – 2022	Mario Zelaya	Canada
2022 – 2023	Mike Morton	Canada
2024 – 2025	Sarah Sed	United States
2025 – present	Mario Zelaya	Canada

== WATL Member Countries ==
There are over 300 WATL-affiliated locations in the following countries:

- United States
- Canada
- Mexico
- Brazil
- United Kingdom
- Netherlands
- Poland
- New Zealand
- Israel
- Japan
- Costa Rica
- Argentina

== See also ==
- Official website
