= World Future Energy Summit =

- Venue: Abu Dhabi National Exhibition Centre
- Location: Abu Dhabi, UAE
- Participants: 600 exhibitors, 200 speakers, 3,150 delegates (2011)

The World Future Energy Summit (WFES) is an annual event hosted in the United Arab Emirates, aiming to advance future energy, energy efficiency, and clean technologies. It began in 2008, held under the patronage of Sheikh Mohammed Bin Zayed Al Nahyan, Crown Prince of Abu Dhabi, and Deputy Supreme Commander of the UAE Armed Forces.

Public relations firm Edelman helped set it up to "burnish the UAE’s green credentials".

The Summit attracts world leaders, international policymakers, industry leaders, investors, experts, academics, intellectuals, and journalists to discuss practical and sustainable solutions to future energy challenges.

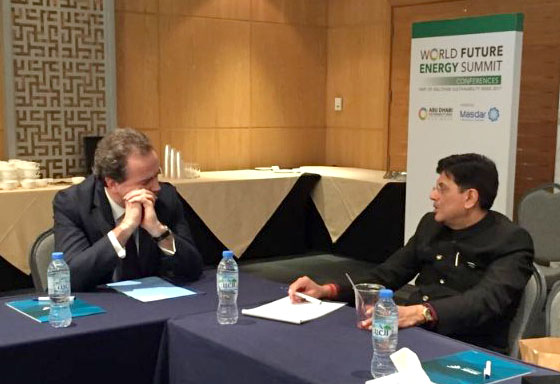
Piyush Goyal in a bilateral meeting with the Minister of State at the Department for Business, Energy and Industrial Strategy, United Kingdom, Mr. Nick Hurd MP, at the World Future Energy Summit, in Abu Dhabi

The Summit, hosted by Masdar, Abu Dhabi's renewable energy company, and staged at the Abu Dhabi National Exhibition Centre, represents a business platform meant to bring together project owners and solution providers with investors and buyers from both the public and private sectors. The Summit is also portrayed as an opportunity for everyone with an interest in addressing climate change to come together to share solutions, reach agreements, and continue to make progress.

== Facts and figures ==
In 2011, WFES was attended by 35 official delegations, over 26,000 attendees, 600 exhibitors, 200 speakers, and 3150 delegates from 112 countries.

The 2011 Summit was attended by several world leaders, including Ban Ki-moon, Olafur Ragnar Grimsson, Asif Ali Zardari, Jose Socrates Carvalho Pinto de Sousa, Sheikh Hasina, Nikoloz Gilauri, Crown Princess Victoria, Prince Guillaume.

== Young Future Energy Leaders ==
The Young Future Energy Leaders (YFEL) is an element of the annual World Future Energy Summit (WFES). A program of the Masdar Institute, it is committed to raising awareness and engaging students and young professionals in the fields of renewable energy and sustainability.

== Zayed Future Energy Prize ==
Sheikh Mohammed bin Zayed Al Nahyan introduced the Zayed Future Energy Prize, an honor in the field of energy, at the 2008 World Future Energy Summit. Energy efficiency and CO_{2} emissions reduction will be the two industries that win the 2012 competition. The 2012 award also highlights three new categories fundamental to solving our future energy challenges—small and medium size enterprises (SMEs) & non-governmental organizations (NGOs); individuals; and large corporations

== See also ==
- World Future Council
