= Deck prism =

Means of transmitting light from the sun to the inside of a boat

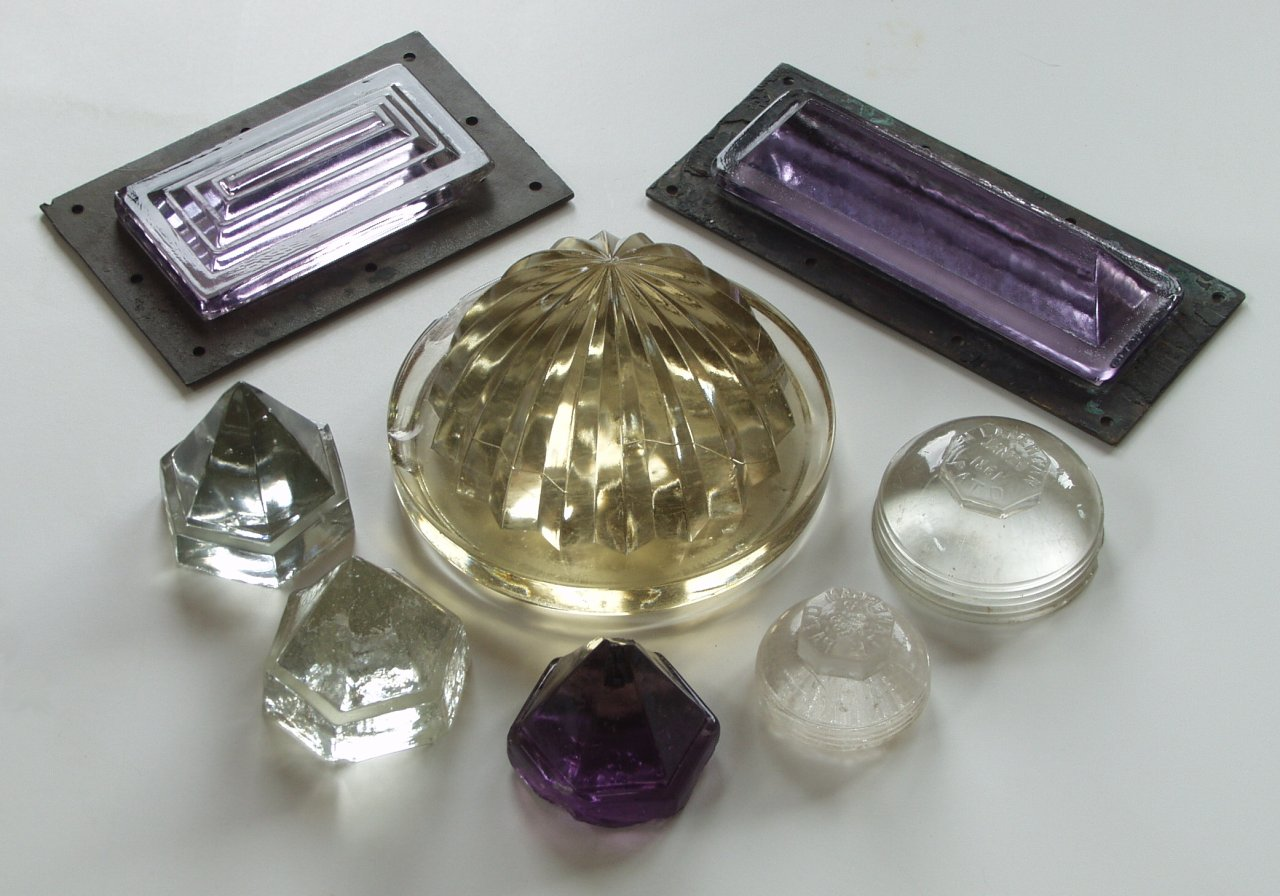
Group of original deck prisms

A deck prism, or bullseye, is a prism inserted into the deck of a ship to provide light down below.

For centuries, sailing ships used deck prisms to provide a safe source of natural sunlight to illuminate areas below decks. Before electricity, light below a vessel's deck was provided by candles, oil and kerosene lamps—all dangerous aboard a wooden ship. The deck prism laid flush into the deck, the glass prism refracted and dispersed natural light into the space below from a small deck opening without weakening the planks or becoming a fire hazard. It required just a 4 inch opening.

In normal usage, the prism hangs below the overhead and disperses the light sideways; the top is flat and installed flush with the deck, becoming part of the deck. The lens shapes were naturally derived from the process of handmaking the glass on an 'iron' and would have predated the ability to manufacture flat glass. (A plain flat glass window would just form a single bright spot below—not very useful for general illumination—hence the prismatic shape.)

To maximize light output, the glass used was originally made colorless with the addition of manganese dioxide; the purple hue of some specimens is caused by decades of exposure to UV.

Aboard colliers (coal ships), prisms were also used to keep check on the cargo hold: light from a fire would be collected by the prism and be made visible on the deck even in daylight.

The names "deck light", "dead light" or "deadlight" are sometimes used, though the latter is uncommon as a reference to prisms, as more often refers to non-opening plain-glass panels. Deadlights were commonplace for lighting underground vaults in the 19th century, in which application they were also called "pavement lights" (UK) or "vault lights" (US).

== See also ==
- Prism lighting
- Prism glass
- Porthole
- Daylighting
- Liter of Light
