= Samuel Provance =

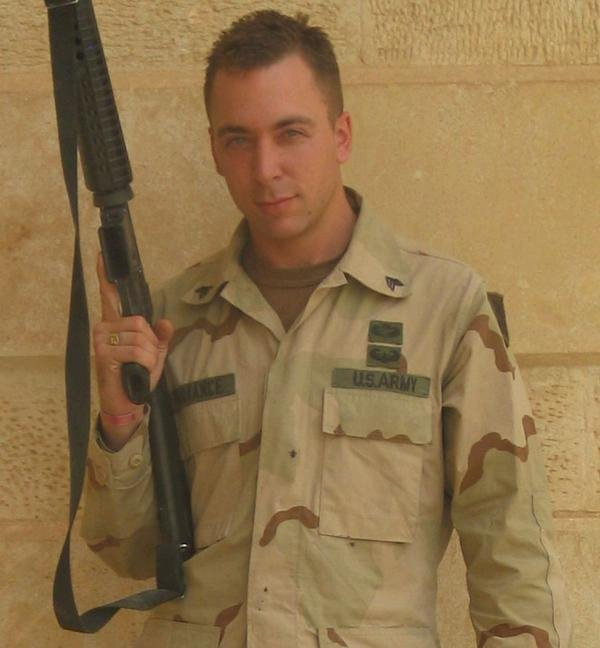
- Born: Samuel J. Provance III; 1973 or 1974 (age 52–53); Fayetteville, Pennsylvania, U.S.
- Allegiance: United States of America
- Branch: United States Army
- Service years: 1998-2006, 2010-present
- Rank: Staff Sergeant
- Conflicts: Iraq War
- Awards: Army Commendation Medal (3); Army Achievement Medal (1); Meritorious Unit Citation; Parachutist Badge; Air Assault Badge

Samuel J. Provance III is a former U.S. Army military intelligence sergeant, known for disobeying an order from his commanders in the 302nd Military Intelligence Battalion by discussing with the media his experiences at the Abu Ghraib Prison, where he was assigned from September 2003 to February 2004. After being disciplined for his actions, he eventually brought his case to the United States Government in February 2006, resulting in a congressional subpoena of the Secretary of Defense Donald Rumsfeld. The main points of his testimony are that military intelligence soldiers and contracted civilian interrogators had abused detainees, that they directed the military police to abuse detainees, the extent of this knowledge at the prison, and the subsequent cover-up of these practices when investigated.

Military intelligence soldiers from the 205th Military Intelligence Brigade, with firsthand knowledge, had in fact spoken with the media weeks before Provance did, which corroborate his claims, saying they wanted to "do what's right ... get the truth out," but they chose to remain anonymous, "because of concern that their military careers would be ruined." In addition, the military police themselves said they were ordered and encouraged by interrogators to treat detainees harshly, to "soften" them up for interrogations, and were commended by their commander for doing so.

== Background ==
Provance was assigned to Abu Ghraib prison (also known as the Baghdad Correctional Facility) shortly after a mortar attack at the prison killed and wounded several soldiers from his unit on September 20, 2003. Though an intelligence analyst supporting the V Corps during the initial phase of Operation Iraqi Freedom, under the command of General William S. Wallace, at Abu Ghraib he supervised the systems administration on the so-called "infamous" night shift, under the command of Lieutenant General Ricardo S. Sanchez.

In January 2004, the same month that saw the unexplained death of his Command Sergeant Major Stacy Adams, Provance was interviewed by a US Army Criminal Investigation Command (CID) agent, as part of Major General Antonio M. Taguba's investigation of Abu Ghraib. Taguba considered Provance a witness based on his sworn statement. His name, along with other witnesses, were made known in May 2004 when the classified Taguba Report was deliberately leaked to the public.

Provance was also interviewed by Major General George Fay, the lead investigator of a second major investigation of Abu Ghraib. Provance later claimed Fay was more interested in the military police in the photographs, not of intelligence operations (Fay was charged with investigating military intelligence). He also claimed Fay resisted his testimony (largely the same provided to Taguba), who afterward decided to recommend charges of "dereliction of duty" against him for not coming forward any sooner, saying if he had, he could have prevented the scandal.

Provance was then issued an order by his company commander, Captain Scott Hedberg, and subsequently his battalion commander, Lt. Colonel James Norwood, not to communicate with anyone about his experiences at Abu Ghraib. Perceiving the threat of charges and the gag order as part of a larger "cover-up", Provance spoke with the media, hoping they would investigate where the military was apparently failing to. His top secret security clearance was suspended and he was administratively "flagged" (a career hold) for 16 months, until he was given an Article 15 (non-judicial punishment). This began with the May 18, 2004 broadcast of ABC World News Tonight with Peter Jennings, where he said, "there's definitely a cover-up...people are either telling themselves or being told to be quiet...many people are probably hiding and wishing to God that this storm passes without them having to be investigated [or] personally looked at". According to the Stars and Stripes, Provance, "still speaks passionately about his dedication to the Army and condemns the few leaders above him". Provance told them, "I would never speak out against the Army, that's not what I'm doing...the Army is an awesome organization that I respect and honor...it's only a matter of time before the truth comes out".

On May 26, 2004, former Vice President Al Gore referred to Provance during a speech at New York University, as the Abu Ghraib scandal evolved into a heated political debate, with the presidential election coming up that November.

On June 15, 2004, Jerry Fleishman wrote a profile of Provance for the Los Angeles Times. "Provance speaks in a near-whisper, but he possesses a steely defiant streak". It was reported that he studied to be a Christian Pastor at Holmes College of the Bible in Greenville, South Carolina, "quitting...after raising too many questions about faith and fundamentalism". He then joined the US Army, enlisting in Air Defense Artillery, later tried out for Special Forces, and then reclassified into Military Intelligence. Despite his circumstances as a result of the Abu Ghraib investigations and scandal, "he reveres the spirit of the combat soldier", and worried that this was now in jeopardy. The Berlin, Germany newspaper Tageszeitung also wrote a profile.

On July 5, 2004, the German news program "Report Mainz" broadcast an interview with Provance, where he revealed that children were detained at Abu Ghraib. In response, the Norwegian government joined the Red Cross and Amnesty International in protest.

Jon Ronson published the book The Men Who Stare at Goats, later made into a motion picture in 2009. Provance, under the name "Joseph Curtis" to protect his identity at that time, is in a chapter named "The Haunted Hotel".

Television's Public Broadcasting Service (PBS), as a part of its documentary program, Frontline (U.S. TV series), features Provance's perspective in the documentary "The Torture Question", in October 2005.

== Congressional testimonies ==
Sometime between September 3–17, 2004, Provance was sent to Washington D.C. to speak with members of the Senate Armed Services Committee and their staff, in preparation for a congressional hearing of Major General Fay's investigation. Initially his chain of command resisted the summons, but eventually were ordered by higher command to comply. It has not been made public what happened during these meetings.

On February 14, 2006, Provance testified before Congress alongside Lieutenant Colonel Anthony Shaffer from the US Army, Michael German from the FBI, and Russell D. Tice from the NSA. He testified that at his Article 15 proceeding in July 2005, he was threatened with up to ten years in military prison if he did not accept the terms of punishment. He accepted the terms, and for "disobeying a lawful order", he was demoted in rank. He also testified about many other things before unknown or not as detailed. Congressman Chris Shays (R-CT), the committee chairman, said to Provance, "I just want to say to you it takes a tremendous amount of courage with your rank to tell a General what they may not want to hear, and people like you will help move our country in the right direction. And so this full committee thanks you for what you have done."

On May 15, 2006, Provance's interview with Report Mainz was selected among other news stories in its forty-year broadcasting history for recognition. He gave an update on that television event, describing the psychological consequences of his experiences, and how exceptional it was that both the Republican and Democrat political parties both grew to support him .

On July 6, 2006, The New York Times reported that the House Committee on Government Reform issued a subpoena to Secretary of Defense Donald Rumsfeld because he had not responded to a March 7, 2006 request for information regarding Provance's demotion and testimony. Four months later, Rumsfeld resigned, citing Abu Ghraib as his "darkest hour", and ignored the subpoena.

== Post Army ==
Provance was honorably discharged from the United States Army in October 2006 in Heidelberg, Germany.

In November 2006, Provance spoke to a group of 350 people in Maplewood, New Jersey and received a certificate of appreciation.

In February 2007, Provance appeared in a HBO documentary, Ghosts of Abu Ghraib, where he describes the prison as, "Apocalypse Now meets The Shining." An extended interview is included in the DVD release. He later wrote an article about his experience at a screening of the film in Washington DC, criticizing Senator Lindsey Graham (R-SC), who had also been in attendance for a post-screening discussion with Senator Ted Kennedy (D-MA), for changing his opinions of Abu Ghraib since he'd been in contact with him.

Tara McKelvey published the book Monstering: Inside America's Policy of Secret Interrogations and Torture in the Terror War, which includes Provance's story most in-depth. She describes him as, "unconventional...a keen sense of injustice". The New York Times, in a book review July 2007, reported, "if the United States still has a chance of winning the battle for the hearts and minds of the Muslim world, then we have people like Provance to thank".

On September 20, 2007, Provance was given the Sam Adams Award for "integrity in intelligence" at the American University. He described missing the Army "more than anything else", and that after having lost his friends and family, speaking to the media was not worth it on a personal level.

On August 29, 2007, Provance published an article about the court-martial of Lt. Col. Steven L. Jordan, titled, "Army Adds Farce to Abu Ghraib Shame". Jordan only received a reprimand in spite of multiple charges. Provance claims the trial was a sham and the latest example of the cover-up of the scandal. He praised the initial investigator, Major General Antonio Taguba, who had since retired, and according to Seymour Hersh said, "I assumed they wanted to know. I was ignorant of the setting...I had been in the Army 32 years by then, and it was the first time that I thought I was in the Mafia."

On January 5, 2008, an interview with Provance was broadcast on the Democracy Now! television program with Amy Goodman. He spoke of the troubles he was facing post-military and other details of the Abu Ghraib scandal. He lamented that "even to this day...there's been nobody else that has had their conscience bother them to come forward and say, look, this is what was really going on, and that it wasn't just these MP's, and that these MP's were really doing what they were told".

On March 12, 2008, Provance appeared on the Arab Voices Radio Talk Show.

On April 30, 2008, Provance wrote a critical editorial about the movie-documentary "Standard Operating Procedure", directed by Oscar-winning director Errol Morris, titled "Abu Ghraib Film Obscures Truth". He claims Morris promised, "a no-holds-barred documentary", but instead only "focuses on the awful photos, the people in them and those who took them". Portions of his interview with Morris, cut from the film's release, are however on the Blu-ray Disc edition's special features.

During June 27–30, 2008, the Psychology and Military Intelligence Casebook on Interrogation Ethics met in Washington, DC, to respond, "to the revelations that American psychologists have been instrumental in abusive interrogations of terrorist suspects in the Global War On Terror". Provance was a named member of this think tank.

On July 11, 2008, Provance gave an interview on Chicago Public Radio, saying he wished he had exhausted more "official channels", but that it is speculation to say if that would have changed anything. He wanted to discuss things more with his leadership, but having reprimanded him for bizarre things like not doing his superior's laundry or not washing vehicles with water they were rationing, he felt they could not be trusted. He wanted to testify on behalf of the military police at their trials, but like in Lynndie England's case, her lawyers were erroneously told he could not be found. He compared his plight to Serpico, but instead of meeting the same fate, says he still loves being a soldier and could return to the Army, though he fears his career would be sabotaged by "higher-ups" who might fear he has ulterior motives.

On October 22, 2009, Provance was given a letter of commendation signed by former President Jimmy Carter and 15,000 others, for his "uncommon courage in defending the rule of law and standing up against torture". In his acceptance of the letter, he responded, "if and when we do the right thing, we may not ever know to what extent our words and actions are ever used by other people, or even God, but you can be sure that they will be". Days later he was interviewed by Karen Kwiatkowski; his final words being, "not to give up on the Army or our country...there are still good people doing good things".

In 2011, Provance went back to Holmes Bible College, which he had previously dropped out from in 1997, became the Dean of Men, and received his Bachelor of Arts degree in theology.

On May 7, 2013, the documentary, "Doctors of the Darkside", produced and directed by Martha Davis, is dedicated, "to Sam Provance and the courage to bear witness", and is screened internationally to raise awareness of "the critical role of physicians and psychologists in detainee torture".

On September 10, 2013, photographer Jo Metson Scott published the book The Grey Line, which documents, "a reflection on the war told from the perspective of Britain and American soldiers who have spoken out against the invasion". Provance is featured on the front cover, and a synopsis of his story is in the book.

On March 18, 2014, the war movie "Boys of Abu Ghraib" was released. It is a fictional story loosely based on the soldiers and events of the Abu Ghraib scandal, which explores the moral dilemmas and philosophical struggles often expressed specifically by Provance and other soldiers who were there.

On November 13, 2016, Provance published an article on OpEd News, entitled "The Ethics of Whistleblowing". He goes into further details behind his intentions and motives in his case, as well as speculating those of others involved. It is also revealed that he re-entered the US Army in 2010, to remain "an agent of change", where he now serves in Psychological Operations (PSYOP).

In April 2023, Provance took part in a discussion panel for the BBC program The Reunion. He was joined by Ali Shallal al-Qaisi (former Abu Ghraib detainee), Janis Karpinski (former US Army General), and Katherine Gallagher (human rights lawyer). He said he rejoined the military because he didn't want to be like Daniel Ellsberg, telling his whistleblowing story over and over, and that he wanted to be an example of a good soldier. He also revealed that Joe Darby only went to authorities because he hated his fellow soldiers and wanted to cause them trouble. He restated his devotion to the military and that his problems have only been with a few leaders and those responsible for "the policies that got us into this mess".
