= Barbara Fast =

United States Army general

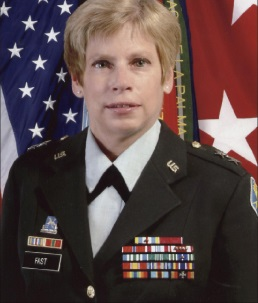
- Major General Barbara Fast
- Military career
- Allegiance: United States
- Branch: United States Army
- Service years: 1976–2008
- Rank: Major General
- Commands: United States Army Intelligence Center; 66th Military Intelligence Group
- Conflicts: Iraq War
- Awards: Defense Superior Service Medal (2); Legion of Merit; Bronze Star Medal

Barbara Fast is a retired major general of the United States Army. One of the first female officers placed in many challenging and dangerous situations and assignments, Fast is a member of the Military Intelligence Corps Hall of Fame. She was the first female to command an Army Military Intelligence Tactical Exploitation Battalion and the first female Intelligence Officer/G2 of a combat division. Her expertise spans across intelligence and cybersecurity. Fast was the most senior military intelligence officer serving in Iraq during the period of time when the Abu Ghraib torture and prisoner abuse occurred.

Fast retired with 32 years of service in 2008. Today she sits on the board of directors at several companies, including American Public Education Inc. (NASDAQ: APEI); Beacon Roofing and Supply Co (NASDAQ: BECN); Hondros College School of Nursing, a wholly owned subsidiary of APEI; and several not-for-profit private organizations.

She is also a strategic advisor at Axellio Aerospace and Defense, and sits on the Strategic Advisory Board at Sierra Nevada Corp., Intelligence and National Security Alliance (INSA), a leading nonpartisan, nonprofit trade association, and Clarifai, an artificial intelligence technology company. She previously sat on the board of directors at INSA and AFCEA (Armed Forces Communications and Electronics Association).

Fast is also a Commissioner on the United States Space and Rocket Center Commission and Chair of the Cyber Advisory Council, a Huntsville, Alabama-based consortium of business, government and academic leaders. She is an Alabama Trustee for the Alabama School of Cyber Technology and Engineering.

Upon retiring from the United States Army, Fast served as the vice president of Cyber and Information Solutions for The Boeing Co. (NYSE:BA). After that, she was employed by CGI Group (NYSE:GIB) for five years as Senior Vice President, Army and Defense Intelligence Programs Business Unit within CGI Federal.

Fast, who is fluent in German and Spanish, facilitated the sharing of information that contributed to the end of the Cold War, having served in Germany during the fall of the Berlin Wall in 1989, when she was Executive Officer of an intelligence battalion and also as the Chief of the Intelligence Division at the 66th Military Intelligence Group. While there, she represented the U.S. intelligence community and played a critical role in facilitating debriefing of refugees and defectors. As the Commander of the 66th Military Intelligence Group and then as the Senior Intelligence Officer (J2) for the U.S. European Command, Gen. Fast was pivotal in guiding the intelligence efforts in the European and African theaters of operation.

Fast's efforts also led to the capture of Saddam Hussein during Operation Iraqi Freedom. She was the senior military intelligence officer serving in Iraq during the period of time when the Abu Ghraib torture and prisoner abuse occurred. Fast was exonerated of any wrongdoing in the findings of the Fay Report.

== Education ==
Fast graduated from Belleville Township High School East in Belleville, Illinois, in 1971 and earned a Master of Science degree in business administration from Boston University and a Bachelor of Science degree in education (German and English) from the University of Missouri in Columbia, Missouri. She was given an honorary Doctorate of Laws degree from Central Missouri University. She also is a graduate of the Army War College in Carlisle, Pennsylvania and the Armed Forces Staff College.

== Military career ==
Fast held a variety of command and staff positions in the United States Army. Her tours included serving as the Deputy Chief, Army Capabilities and Integration Center and G9, Training and Doctrine Command; Commanding General, United States Army Intelligence Center; C2 (Director of Intelligence), Combined Joint Task Force-7 and Multi-National Forces-Iraq; J2 (Director of Intelligence), United States European Command; Associate Deputy Director of Operations/Deputy Chief, Central Security Service and S1, National Security Agency; Commander, 66th Military Intelligence Group; G2 (Director of Intelligence), 2nd Armored Division; and commanding officer of the 163rd Military Intelligence Battalion.

Fast was promoted to the rank of general in July 2000. In June 2001, Fast was named director of intelligence for The United States European Command and stationed in Stuttgart, Germany. On the morning of the September 11 attacks, Fast was a passenger on American Airlines Flight 49 en route from Paris to Dallas when the flight was diverted to Gander International Airport in Gander, Newfoundland and Labrador, Canada following the closure of American airspace to international flights. Despite being the top ranking intelligence officer for Europe, Africa and parts of the Middle East, Fast remained waylaid in Gander for several days following the attacks and was only able to communicate with her staff intermittently and on unsecured lines.

Fast was nominated to the Military Intelligence Corps Hall of Fame in 2009, and received support from numerous generals, including General David Petraeus, former director of the CIA, during the nomination process.

Fast was the most senior military intelligence officer serving in Iraq during the period of time when the Abu Ghraib torture and prisoner abuse occurred. Critics believed she should have been held partly accountable for the abuses committed at Abu Ghraib by military intelligence personnel, but she was exonerated by the military. In the Fay Report, Fast received praise for improving intelligence collection efforts when the Iraqi insurgency was growing in the summer of 2003. Changes she put in place "improved the intelligence process and saved the lives of coalition forces and Iraqi civilians," according to Army Major General George Fay.
