= Thomas Pappas =

US Army officer (born 1959)

- Born: Thomas M. Pappas; 1959 (age 66–67); Washington DC
- Military career
- Allegiance: United States of America
- Branch: United States Army
- Rank: Colonel (retired)
- Commands: 205th Military Intelligence Brigade
- Conflicts: Iraq War
- Awards: Legion of Merit; Bronze Star

Thomas M. Pappas is a former United States Army colonel who is a civilian intelligence officer with the Army's Training and Doctrine Command at Fort Eustis, Virginia.

He was the Brigade Commander of the 205th Military Intelligence Brigade and the senior military intelligence officer at Abu Ghraib prison during the Abu Ghraib prisoner abuse scandal, which brought him significant notoriety. In May 2005, Pappas was disciplined by the Army for failing to properly supervise and train subordinates and for allowing military dogs to be present during prisoner interrogations.

== Education ==
Prior to entering the army, he attended Rutgers University in New Jersey and received his Master of Science degree from Central Michigan University. He also has a Master of Arts from the Naval War College in Newport, Rhode Island.

== Role in Abu Ghraib ==
In June 2004, Captain Donald Reese, the Commanding Officer of the 372nd Military Police Company, testified that Colonel Pappas was the senior officer present when Manadel al-Jamadi was tortured to death during a CIA interrogation while in custody at Abu Ghraib. Military pathologists later ruled the death a homicide. During Sabrina Harman's article 32 hearing, Reese testified that Pappas commented about al-Jamadi's death, "I'm not going down for this alone."

Major General George Fay was appointed by General Paul Kern to conduct an investigation of prisoner abuse at the Joint Interrogation Debriefing Center (JIDC) in Abu Ghraib prison. His findings were released in August 2004 and were known as the Fay Report. He concluded that Pappas failed to properly organize the JIDC and ensure it performed its mission within applicable regulations, failed to incorporate checks and balances to prevent abuses, and failed to ensure his personnel were properly trained for the mission. Fay also found that Pappas showed poor judgment by leaving Lieutenant Colonel Steven L. Jordan in charge of the JIDC during critical stages and improperly authorized the use of dogs during interrogations, failed to take action regarding International Committee of the Red Cross reports of abuse, failed to take aggressive action against soldiers who violated procedures and the Geneva Conventions, failed to report that his unit would be unable to accomplish its mission due to lack of manpower and resources and allowed his subordinates to be subjected to inordinate pressures from higher headquarters, and failed to establish appropriate coordination between military intelligence and military police which would have alleviated confusion surrounding the abusive environment at the prison. Fay acknowledged that a significant number of systemic failures had occurred during the course of the scandal but asserted this did not relieve Pappas of his command responsibilities and recommended that Pappas' chain of command take action accordingly.

In May 2005, Pappas received non-judicial punishment for two counts of dereliction of duty under the Uniform Code of Military Justice for failing to ensure that subordinates were adequately trained and supervised in application of interrogation procedures and for failing to obtain approval of superiors before authorizing the presence of military working dogs during prisoner interrogations.

In November 2006, human rights attorney Wolfgang Kaleck filed a high-profile criminal complaint at the German Public Prosecutor General against Donald Rumsfeld and several other US officials and officers, including Pappas, for their alleged involvement in human rights violations at Abu Ghraib. However, legal scholars speculated shortly thereafter that the case had little chance of successfully making it through the German court system.

In May 2007, a book written by Stanford psychology professor and supervisor of the Stanford Prison Experiment, Philip Zimbardo, titled The Lucifer Effect, questioned the mental stability of Pappas when the abuses at Abu Ghraib were committed, suggesting that after surviving a mortar attack killing Pappas's driver, Pappas exhibited erratic behavior.

In August 2007, Pappas was granted immunity in return for his testimony at the court-martial of his subordinate Lieutenant Colonel Steven L. Jordan.

== Decorations ==
During his career, Colonel Pappas was awarded the Legion of Merit, the Bronze Star, the Meritorious Service Medal with six oak leaf clusters, the Army Commendation Medal with two oak leaf clusters, and the Army Achievement Medal with two oak leaf clusters, the National Defense Service Medal with one service star, the Armed Forces Expeditionary Medal, the Southwest Asia Service Medal with three service stars, the Armed Forces Service Medal, and the Armed Forces Reserve Medal.

== See also ==
- 205th Military Intelligence Brigade
