= Paul Kern =

Paul Kern may refer to:

- Paul Kern (insomniac), Hungarian who was supposedly unable to sleep
- Paul J. Kern (born 1945), United States Army officer
