= Steven L. Jordan =

American soldier and alleged torturer

- Born: 1956 (age 69–70); South Dakota
- Military career
- Allegiance: United States of America
- Branch: United States Army
- Service years: 1979–2009
- Rank: Lieutenant colonel
- Unit: United States Army Reserve
- Commands: Joint Interrogation Debriefing Center at Abu Ghraib prison
- Conflicts: Iraq War
- Awards: Purple Heart; Defense Meritorious Service Medal; Meritorious Service Medal; Joint Service Commendation Medal; Army Commendation Medal; Army Achievement Medal

Steven L. Jordan (born 1956) is a former United States Army Reserve officer. Jordan volunteered to return to active duty to support the war in Iraq, and as a civil affairs officer with a background in military intelligence, was made the director of the Joint Interrogation Debriefing Center at Abu Ghraib prison.

He is best known for his alleged involvement in the 2004 Abu Ghraib torture and prisoner abuse. In 2007, he was put on trial for prisoner abuse but was declared not guilty of the charges. He left the Army in 2009.

== Abu Ghraib ==
=== Taguba and Fay reports ===
In a report by Army Major General Antonio Taguba, Jordan was among several described as being "directly or indirectly responsible for the abuses at Abu Ghraib". Jordan supervised the interrogation task force at Abu Ghraib, and was the second highest-ranking military intelligence officer there, serving under Col. Thomas Pappas who was granted immunity from prosecution so that he can testify against Jordan. On April 28, 2006, Jordan became the highest ranking Army officer to face charges relating to the Abu Ghraib abuse when charges were filed against him, including oppressing detainees, lying about abuse, and dereliction of duty.

Major General George Fay and Lieutenant General Anthony Jones were appointed to look into the abuse at Abu Ghraib. A number of findings were made in their investigative report, with recommendations the authorities should take against the officers and enlisted soldiers implicated in the Abu Ghraib prisoner abuse, including Jordan. The report alleged that Jordan failed to properly train soldiers and civilians on the ICRP, failed to take full responsibility for his role as the Director, JIDC, failed to establish the necessary checks and balances to prevent and detect abuses, was derelict in his duties by failing to establish order on the night of 24 November 2003 contributing to a chaotic situation in which detainees were abused, failed to prevent the unauthorized use of dogs and prisoners being kept naked while he was the senior officer at the site, failed to accurately and timely relay critical information to his commander, COL Pappas, and was allegedly deceitful during the investigation. The report also charged that Jordan failed to obey a lawful order to refrain from contacting anyone except his attorney regarding the investigation by soliciting support by email from others who were involved in the investigation.

=== Court martial ===
In 2007, Jordan was tried by court martial on charges of failure to obey regulations, cruelty and maltreatment of detainees, dereliction of duty, making a false official statement, obstruction of justice, and discussing the investigation with others when ordered not to do so. On August 20, 2007, the presiding judge at Jordan's court martial dismissed two charges against him after Major General George Fay admitted that he did not read Jordan his rights before interviewing him in reference to the abuses that had taken place. This admission contradicted his sworn testimony at a March 12, 2007 pretrial hearing in which he testified under oath that he had advised Jordan of his rights. The charges dismissed were making a false official statement and false swearing and obstruction of justice. On the same day prosecutors narrowed the scope of the cruelty and maltreatment charge from a three-month period to one day. Jordan was only tried on this charge based on the events of November 24, 2003 during a weapons search.

Jordan asserted he was a scapegoat "because he is a reservist, is considered expendable". It was his belief that interrogation procedures were the responsibility of Colonel Thomas Pappas, the intelligence brigade commander and highest-ranking officer at Abu Ghraib, and Captain Carolyn Wood, leader of a unit within the interrogation center called the Interrogation Command Element. Neither of these two officers has been charged, although Pappas was fined $8,000 for approving the use of dogs during an interrogation without higher approval. During the trial, witnesses for the prosecution appeared to support some of Jordan's claims. Pappas testified that Jordan's responsibilities involved improving the quality of life for soldiers at the base and "improving the flow of intelligence information". He admitted that he advised Jordan to "let the experienced interrogators run the interrogations." Pappas also testified that Jordan was not in charge of the military police who ran the prison and who were responsible for some of the abuses. He further stipulated that military police were in charge of the November 24, 2003 weapons search which he had personally observed, and found no issues with. Other soldiers testified that Jordan was not present during any of the abuses.

On August 28, 2007, Jordan was convicted of disobeying an order not to discuss a 2004 investigation into the allegations, but found not guilty on all other charges. The next day a military judge issued Jordan a reprimand for disobeying the order. On review on January 8, 2008, Jordan's conviction and sentence were dismissed by Major General Richard J. Rowe, commanding general of the Military District of Washington. Rowe issued Jordan an administrative reprimand questioning Jordan's decision to disobey Fay's order not to communicate with anyone other than his attorneys during Fay's investigation.

== Military awards ==
Jordan received the following awards, service medals, and ribbons during his service in the Army:

- Purple Heart
- Defense Meritorious Service Medal
- Meritorious Service Medal with Oak Leaf Cluster
- Joint Service Commendation Medal
- Army Commendation Medal with four Oak Leaf Clusters
- Army Achievement Medal
- Joint Meritorious Unit Award
- Good Conduct Medal
- Army Reserve Components Achievement Medal
- National Defense Service Medal with service star
- Armed Forces Expeditionary Medal
- Iraq Campaign Medal with campaign star
- Global War on Terror Service Medal
- Korea Defense Service Medal
- Armed Forces Service Medal
- Humanitarian Service Medal
- Armed Forces Reserve Medal with silver hourglass and "M" devices
- Army Service Ribbon
- Overseas Service Ribbon
- Army Reserve Components Overseas Training Ribbon
- NATO Medal (Former Yugoslavia)
