= Santos Cardona =

American military dog handler (1974–2009)

- Born: Santos A. Cardona; May 4, 1974; Orange County, California, U.S.
- Died: February 28, 2009 (aged 34); Uruzgan Province, Afghanistan
- Cause of death: Improvised explosive device
- Spouse: Heather Ashby
- Children: 1
- Status: Released
- Convictions: Aggravated assault and dereliction of duty
- Penalty: 90 days of hard labor, reduction in rank
- Military career
- Allegiance: United States
- Conflicts: Iraq War

Santos A. Cardona (May 4, 1974 – February 28, 2009) was a former American soldier and military police dog handler who was convicted of dereliction of duty and aggravated assault in connection with the Abu Ghraib prisoner abuse that occurred in 2003–2004. He was sentenced to 90 days of hard labor, along with a fine and reduction in rank. After his release, he continued to serve and was promoted to sergeant before leaving the United States Army in 2007 with an honorable discharge. He later worked as a contractor with American K-9 Detection Services for the U.S. Government in Afghanistan. He was killed in February 2009 when the vehicle he was riding was struck by an improvised explosive device.

== Military career ==
Cardona joined the United States Army in 1993 at the age of 17, needing his father's signature as a waiver to join. His career led him to become a dog handler, a job he performed on deployments to Kosovo, Iraq, and later, as a government contractor in Afghanistan. His duties as a dog handler included both security, and also use of the canine's sense of smell to locate explosives, both improvised explosive devices (IEDs) and unexploded ordnance (UXO).

While deployed to Iraq, Cardona was accused of using his Belgian Malinois dog "Duco", to threaten Iraqis in Abu Ghraib prison. Photos of the event were later made public. In May 2006 he was convicted of dereliction of duty and aggravated assault, the equivalent of a felony in the U.S. civilian justice system. The prosecution demanded prison time, but a military judge imposed a fine and reduction in rank, and he was required to serve 90 days of hard labor at Fort Bragg, North Carolina.

After his release he was transferred to a new unit and was promoted to Sergeant. He was then assigned to the 23rd MP Company that was staged in Kuwait as of November 2, 2006. He arrived in Kuwait with his unit and was selected to train Iraqi police.

On November 3, 2006, Lt. Col. Josslyn L. Aberle, chief of media operations for the Multi-National Force in Iraq, stated on behalf of the Pentagon that Cardona's movement with his unit into Iraq from a staging area in Kuwait had been stopped and that "he's not coming to Iraq, and will depart Kuwait and will return to Fort Bragg immediately where he will be assigned duties commensurate with his Military Occupation Specialty and rank that allows him to be a productive member of the military police corps and the United States Army." Following his return to Fort Bragg, Cardona worked at the Army dog kennels. Cardona needed 5 more years of military service in order to gain full retirement benefits, but was unable to re-enlist due to provisions of his conviction for the incidents at Abu-Ghraib prison in Iraq. On September 29, 2007, Cardona left the Army with an Honorable Discharge.

== Post-military career and death ==
After leaving the Army, Santos Cardona worked in Florida for a time as private security for a musician, then also as a motorcycle salesman. With the intention of returning to work as a dog handler, Cardona joined the Florida firm American K-9 Detection Services, and returned to Afghanistan in November 2008 as a government contractor. Cardona and his Working Dog, a German Shepherd named "Zomie", were Killed In Action (KIA) on February 28, 2009, in Uruzgan Province, Islamic Republic of Afghanistan, when the vehicle he was riding in struck a buried improvised explosive device.

== Personal life ==
Cardona became involved with Heather Ashby, a fellow Military Police soldier, while stationed in Germany in the late 1990s. They had a daughter Keelyn in 1999. Cardona adopted his working dog "Duco" at the end of the animal's military service.
