= 302nd Military Intelligence Battalion (United States) =

302nd Intelligence and Electronic Warfare Battalion
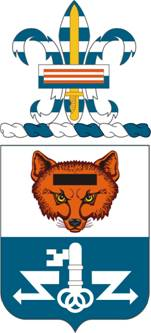
- 302nd IEW BN's Coat of Arms
- Active: April 1944 – present
- Country: United States
- Branch: U.S. Army
- Role: Intelligence and Electronic Warfare
- Part of: 101st Airborne Division
- Garrison/HQ: Fort Campbell, Kentucky
- Nickname: Sly Fox
- Mottos: Loyalty, Vigilance, Pride
- Engagements: World War II; Operation Desert Shield; Operation Desert Storm; Operation Iraqi Freedom
- Decorations: Superior Unit Award; Meritorious Unit Commendation(2)
- Battle honours: Normandy Campaign

Insignia
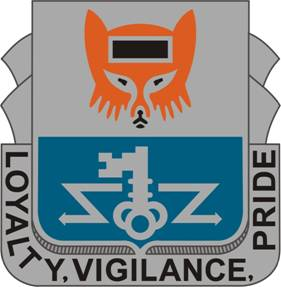
- Distinctive Unit Insignia

The 302nd Intelligence and Electronic Warfare Battalion (302nd IEW BN), whose unit crest portrays the "sly fox", evolved from the 3252d Signal Service Company which was activated in England on 1 April 1944. Currently, the 302nd IEW BN provides the 101st Airborne Division with direct support in multi-domain intelligence collection capabilities to enhance the 101st's intelligence readiness.

== History ==
The 3252nd saw service in France and Germany before returning to Camp Kilmer, New Jersey, where it was deactivated in 1945. The unit was awarded battle credits for participation in the Invasion of Normandy. The 3252nd was re-designated the 533rd Signal Service Company in 1948 and served until 1949 in Salzburg, Austria.

In 1950, the 533rd Signal Service Company was re-designated the 302nd Communications Reconnaissance Battalion. It was assigned to the Army Security Agency and activated at Camp Pickett, Virginia. The unit departed Camp Pickett in 1951 to Fort Hood, Texas in 1952. In August 1952, the unit departed for Germany. In 1957, the 302nd was deactivated in Germany.

In 1975, the 302nd was reactivated in Germany and assigned to the 502nd Army Security Agency (ASA) in support of V Corps. In 1977, the battalion was transferred from the Army Security Agency to United States Army Europe (USAREUR).

In 1984, the 302nd was reorganized as the 302nd Military Intelligence Battalion, and subordinated to the 205th Military Intelligence Group of V Corps under the Combat Electronics Warfare Intelligence (CEWI) Concept. In 1985, the 302nd was subordinated from the 205th Military Intelligence Group to the 205th Military Intelligence Brigade.

In August 1990, a detachment deployed to Saudi Arabia for Operations Desert Shield and Desert Storm. Through the nineties, the 302nd deployed to the Balkans and was awarded the Superior Unit Award.

As part of V Corps, the 302nd deployed to Iraq for Operation Iraqi Freedom in 2003 and a subsequent rotation. The unit was awarded two Meritorious Unit Commendations. On 20 September 2003, Specialist Lunsford Brown, from Alpha Company, was killed in action at the Abu Ghraib prison in Iraq.

On 2 January 2004, James Stacy Adams, the battalion's Command Sergeant Major, was found dead in his apartment.

In 2007, the 302nd began its transformation into the 24th Military Intelligence Battalion. With the deactivation of the 205th Military Intelligence Brigade, in October 2007, the 302nd was assigned to USAREUR and attached to the 66th Military Intelligence Group.

In 2023, the 302nd was reactivated as the 302nd Intelligence and Electronic Warfare Battalion at Fort Campbell under the 525th Military Intelligence Brigade, supporting the 101st Airborne Division.

In 2024, the 302nd IEW BN was transferred directly to the 101st Airborne Division as part of U.S. Army's 2030 transformation plan.

== Unit crest ==
"White and teal blue, are symbolic of the battalion's former status as an unassigned-to-branch unit. The battalion's war service as a signal unit is shown by the colors of the fox's mask and background, while the intelligence functions of the unit are represented by the black censor's stamp. The key is for the unit's first campaign (Normandy) in World War II and also alludes to signal and intelligence functions. The stylized lightning flashes symbolize radio reconnaissance."

== Decorations ==
- Meritorious Unit Commendation for Operation Iraqi Freedom 2005–2006

=== Company A ===
- Meritorious Unit Commendation for Operation Iraqi Freedom 2003–2004
