= Cisco Systems, Inc. v. Doe =

- Supreme Court of the United States

Decided June 23, 2026
- Full case name: Cisco Systems, Inc. v. Doe
- Docket no.: 24-856
- Citations: 609 U.S. ___ (more)

Holding
- Courts may not create new rights of action to remedy violations of international law under the Alien Tort Statute; neither the ATS nor the Torture Victim Protection Act of 1991 cover aiding-and-abetting offenses.

Court membership
- Chief Justice John Roberts Associate Justices Clarence Thomas · Samuel Alito; Sonia Sotomayor · Elena Kagan; Neil Gorsuch · Brett Kavanaugh; Amy Coney Barrett · Ketanji Brown Jackson

Case opinions
- Majority: Barrett, joined by Roberts, Thomas, Alito, Gorsuch, Kavanaugh
- Concur/dissent: Jackson, joined by Kagan
- Dissent: Sotomayor, joined by Kagan and Jackson (Parts I–III and V)

Cisco Systems, Inc. v. Doe, 609 U.S. ___ (2026), was a United States Supreme Court case in which the court held that courts may not create new rights of action to remedy violations of international law under the Alien Tort Statute. Furthermore, neither the ATS nor the Torture Victim Protection Act of 1991 cover aiding-and-abetting offenses.
