= Fay Report =

Military investigation into the Abu Ghraib torture and abuse scandal

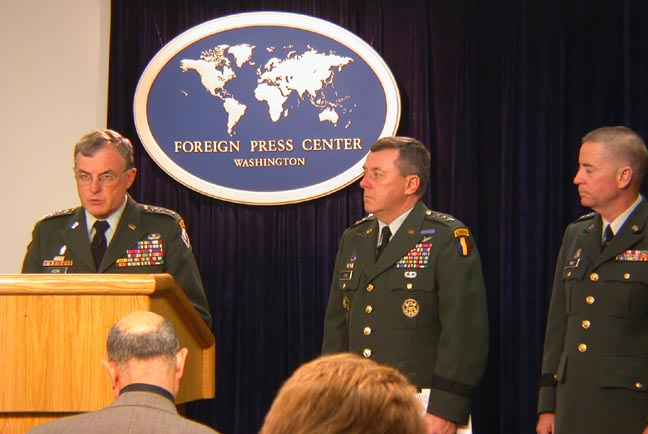
General Paul Kern receiving the report on the Abu Ghraib scandal from Generals George Fay and Anthony Jones

The Fay Report, officially titled Investigation of Intelligence Activities at Abu Ghraib, was a military investigation into the torture and abuse of prisoners at the Abu Ghraib prison in Iraq. It was sparked by leaked images of Iraqi prisoners, hooded and naked, being mistreated obtained by the United States and global media in April 2004. The Fay Report was one of five such investigations ordered by the military and was the third to be submitted, as it was completed and released on August 25, 2004. Prior to the report's release, seven reservist military police had already been charged for their roles in the abuse at the prison, and so the report examined the role of military intelligence, specifically the 205th Military Intelligence Brigade that was responsible for the interrogation of prisoners at Abu Ghraib. General Paul J. Kern was the appointing authority for the report and oversaw the investigation. The chief investigators were Major General George Fay, whom the report is named after, and Lieutenant General Anthony R. Jones.

The Fay Report noted that "contracting-related issues contributed to the problems at Abu Ghraib prison". General Fay also wrote that "The general policy of not contracting for intelligence functions and services was designed in part to avoid many of the problems that eventually developed at Abu Ghraib...". The report identified lack of contractor oversight as a cause of both the insufficient training that contractors received and inadequate contract management. While over half the interrogators at the prison were employees of defense contractor CACI International, up to 35% lacked any formal military interrogation training. Questions have also been raised about whether CACI's background checks on prospective employees were adequate. In addition to questions about contractors qualifications, the report also notes that military personnel were ill-prepared for the tasks of contract administration, monitoring and oversight.

The Fay Report implicated 27 members of the 205th Military Intelligence Brigade in the abuse, including four civilian contractors and an additional three military police to the seven previously charged. Eight members were also cited for not reporting the mistreatment. Colonel Thomas M. Pappas, who was commander and the top military intelligence officer at Abu Ghraib, along with four lower-ranking officers were subject to possible criminal charges as well as administrative action and another four officers ranking higher than colonel. The report "revealed disturbing facts" of the cited forty-four cases of abuse, with General Kern going as far to call some of these abuses torture. One example of such mistreatment cited in the report was a 'game' where guards and interrogators competed with dogs to see who could make naked teenage prisoners defecate out of fear first.

In addition to the abuse, the report cited at least eight cases of ghost detainees, or inmates hidden from the International Committee of the Red Cross and other human rights groups. General Kern acknowledged there could be more than a dozen cases, and other reports later confirmed there could have been more than 100, bringing forth media questions about the role of the CIA at the prison.

The report concluded that higher-ranking officials such as Lieutenant General Ricardo Sanchez, the top US commander in Iraq, and Defense Secretary Donald Rumsfeld, as well as Pentagon and Justice Department officials were not culpable but bore responsibility for creating conditions that led to the abuse and recommended further investigation. These conditions included commanders being under-prepared for the mass influx of prisoners, poor leadership and discipline, unclear directives, and a lack of troops, and questioned how only lower-ranking personnel were solely responsible for some of the 'torture methods' carried out.

== See also ==
- Carolyn Wood
- Church Report
- Ryder Report
- Taguba Report
