= 205th Military Intelligence Brigade =

205th Military Intelligence Battalion
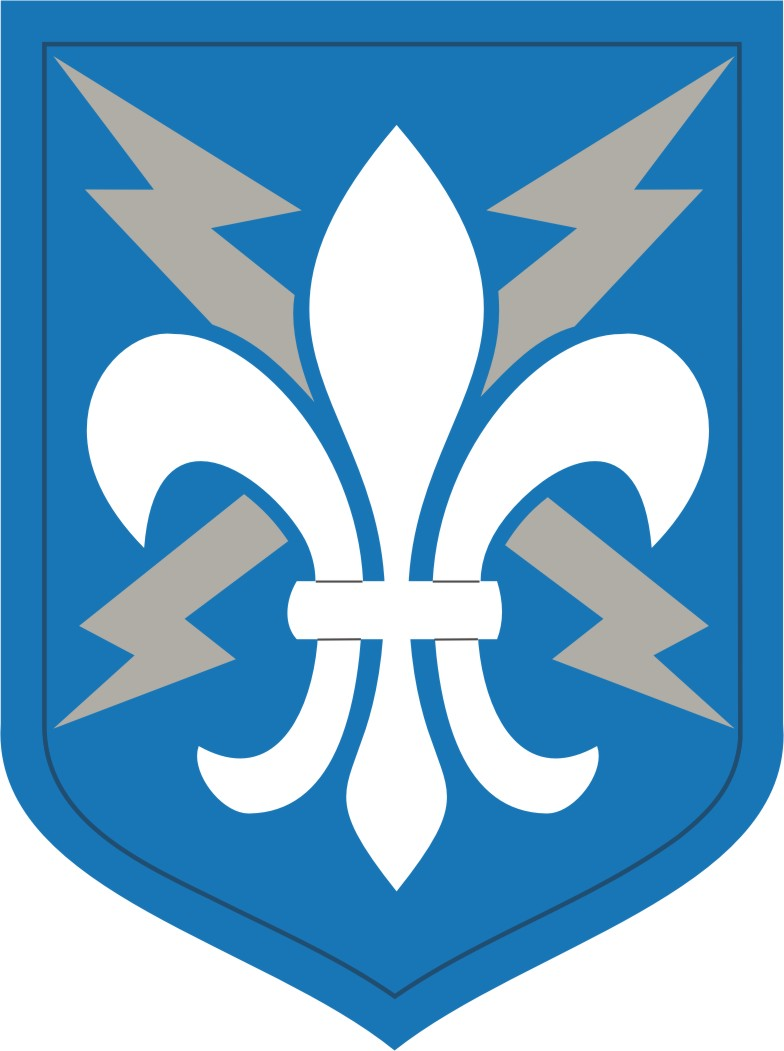
- Active: July 1944 – June 2007
- Country: United States
- Branch: U.S. Army
- Type: Military Intelligence
- Size: Brigade
- Part of: V Corps
- Engagements: World War II Northern France; Rhineland; Ardennes - Alsace; Central Europe Vietnam Counter Offensive, Phase II; Counter Offensive, Phase III; Tet Counter Offensive; Counter Offensive, Phase IV; Counter Offensive, Phase V Counter Offensive, Phase VI; Tet 69 Counter Offensive; Summer - Fall Campaign 1969 Bosnia-Herzegovina Task Force Eagle

Insignia
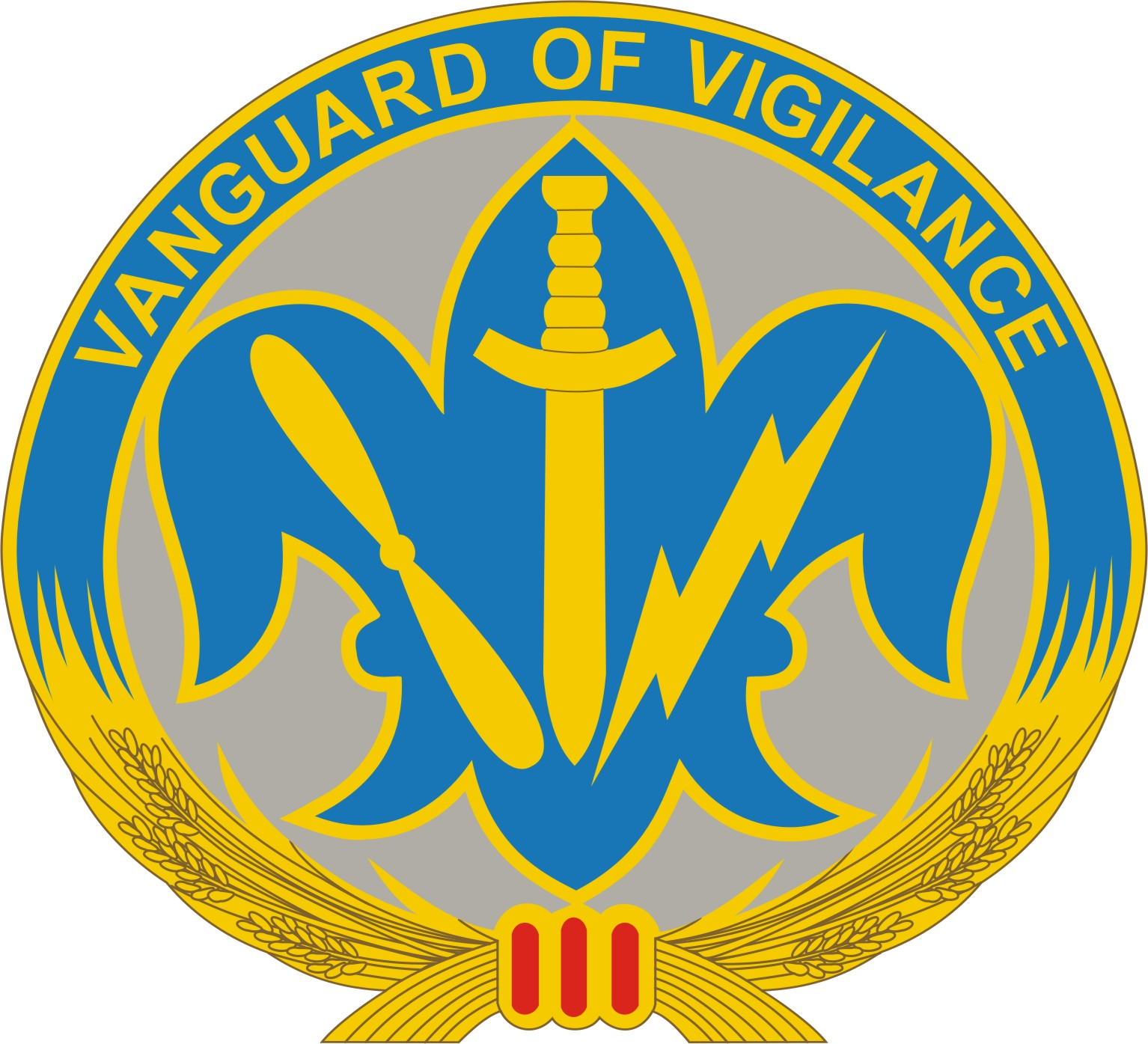
- 205th Military Intelligence Brigade DUI

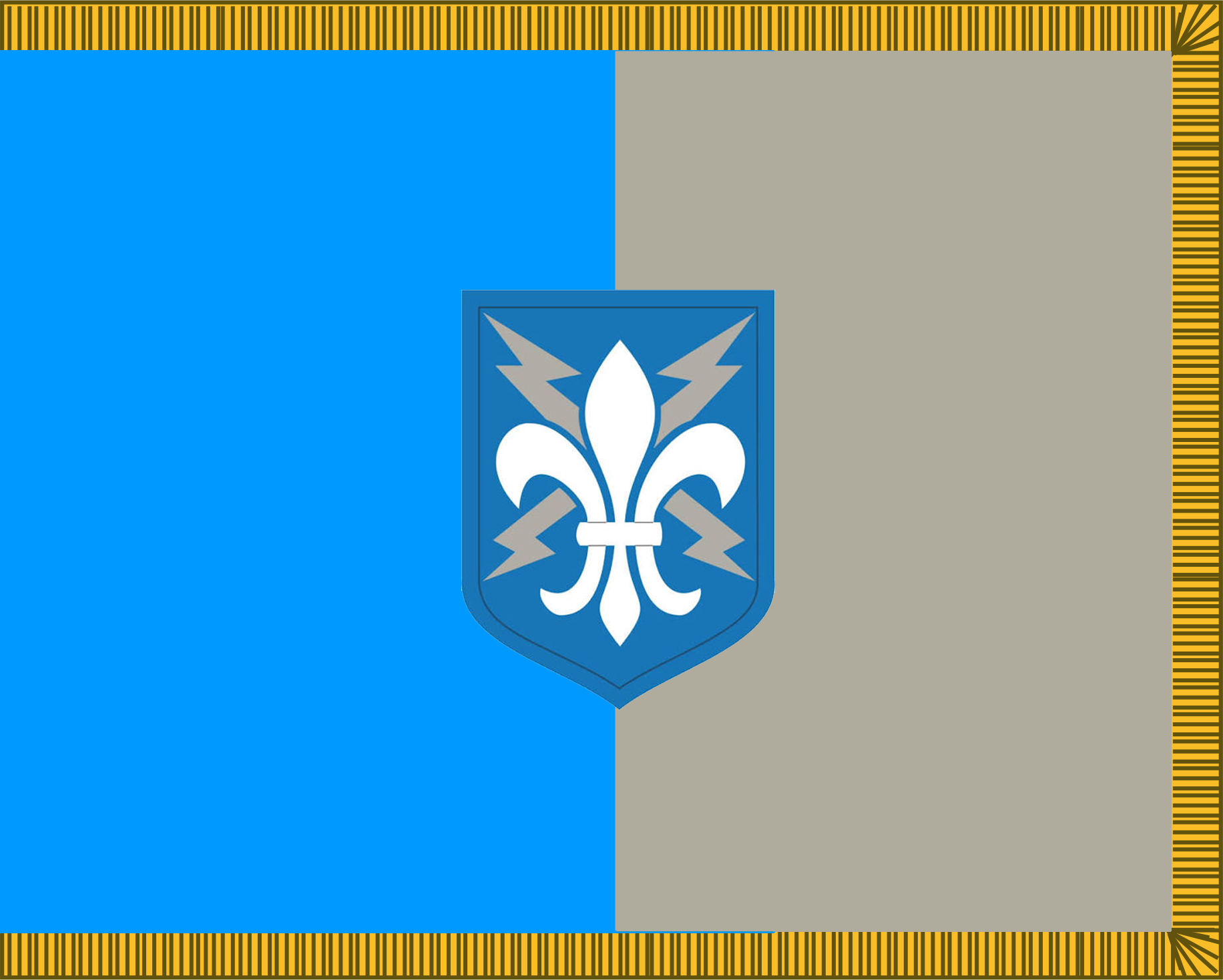
- 205th Military Intelligence Brigade Flag

The United States Army's 205th Military Intelligence Brigade (205th MI BDE) and its three battalions have a history dating back to World War II. The brigade has been in a continuous active service since 1944. The brigade was constituted on 12 July 1944 in the Army of the United States as the 205th Counter Intelligence Corps Detachment. It was allotted to the Regular Army on 6 October 1950. The unit served during World War II in Northern France, the Rhineland, Ardennes-Alsace and Central Europe. It was reorganized and redesignated as the 205th Military Intelligence Detachment on 25 June 1958.

In Vietnam, the 205th took part in the Tet Offensive; the Tet 69/Counteroffensive; and the Summer-Fall Campaign of 1969. In October 1983, the Detachment was consolidated with Headquarters, 135th Military Intelligence Group and redesignated as Headquarters and Headquarters Detachment, 205th Military Intelligence Group. On 16 October 1985, the 205th MI Group was redesignated the 205th Military Intelligence Brigade.

More than two thirds of the brigade deployed to Bosnia and Herzegovina with Task Force Eagle in December 1995, redeploying to Germany in November 1996. The brigade continued to provide intelligence support to V Corps, and to the ongoing Joint and Combined Operations in the Balkans, from principal operating bases in Germany and Italy.

The 205th MI BDE took part of Operation Iraqi Freedom where it was involved in the Abu Ghraib torture and prisoner abuse investigations and resulting scandal, beginning in late 2003. Major General George Fay initially began the investigation, which was later finished by Lieutenant General Anthony Jones in 2004. As a result of the Fay Report, Colonel Thomas Pappas, commander of the 205th from 2003 to 2005, received an Article 15 for "dereliction of duty" in his leadership role at the Abu Ghraib prison. He was also relieved of his command in May 2005, one month shy of his scheduled rotation from that position. Sergeant Samuel Provance, an enlisted intelligence analyst from one of the brigade's battalions, also received an Article 15, for "disobeying a direct order" for speaking to the media during the investigations.

Ray Starmann, a former 205th MI BDE intelligence officer and author of the books "Smoke and Mirrors" and "Charlie Foxtrot", wrote a scathing critique of the brigade in 2005 in light of revelations from the Abu Ghraib prison investigations, titled, "Decline and Fall of the 205th MI Brigade". "MI just exited stage left – out of a wing at Abu Ghraib prison".

The 205th "cased its colors" on 21 June 2007 and was deactivated.
