= Paul J. Kern =

United States Army general

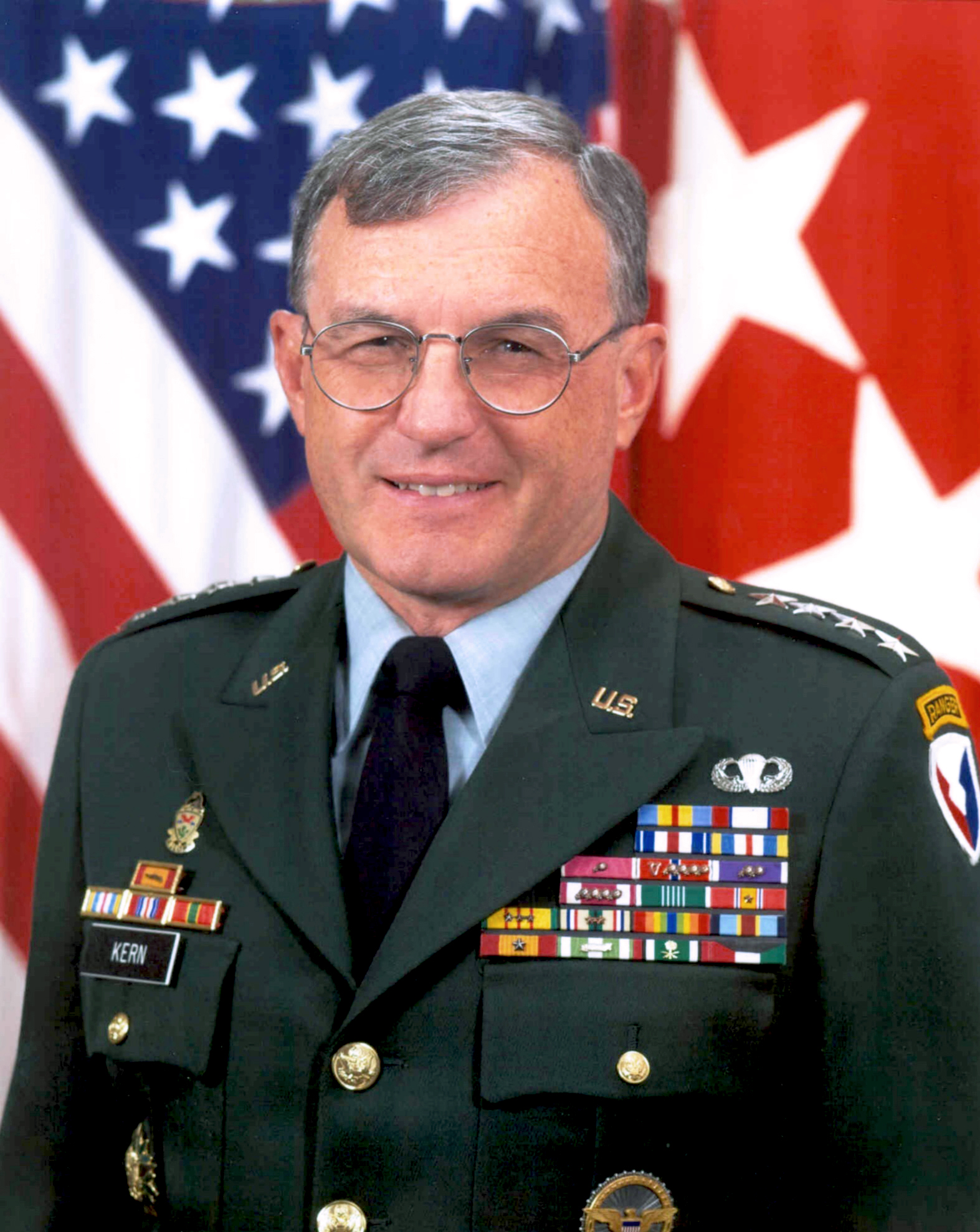
- Official portrait, 2001
- Born: 16 June 1945 (age 81); New Jersey, United States
- Alma mater: University of Michigan
- Military career
- Allegiance: United States
- Branch: United States Army
- Service years: 1967–2005
- Rank: General
- Commands: United States Army Materiel Command; 4th Infantry Division; 2nd Brigade, 24th Infantry Division; 5th Battalion, 32nd Armor Regiment
- Conflicts: Vietnam War; Gulf War
- Awards: Defense Distinguished Service Medal; Army Distinguished Service Medal; Silver Star; Defense Superior Service Medal; Legion of Merit (2); Bronze Star Medal (5); Purple Heart (3)
- Other work: Board of Directors, EDO Corporation

Paul John Kern (born 16 June 1945) is a retired United States Army general and businessman. He served as Commanding General of the United States Army Materiel Command from October 2001 to November 2004. He became President and Chief Operating Officer of AM General LLC on 1 August 2008.

== Military service ==
Kern is a native of West Orange, New Jersey, and attended West Orange High School in his hometown. He was commissioned in 1967 as an Armor officer following graduation from the United States Military Academy. In 1973 he earned master's degrees in both mechanical and civil engineering from the University of Michigan.

Kern served two tours in Vietnam with the 11th Armored Cavalry Regiment as a platoon leader and troop commander, and was a battalion operations officer with the 3rd Armored Division in Germany. He also commanded the 5th Battalion, 32nd Armor, 24th Infantry Division at Fort Stewart, Georgia; commanded the 2nd Brigade, 24th Infantry Division at Fort Stewart and during Desert Shield/Desert Storm; and was the Assistant Division Commander of the 24th Infantry Division after redeployment to Fort Stewart.

Kern also served as the Commander, 4th Infantry Division (Mechanized). He was also the senior military assistant to the Secretary of Defense and Deputy Secretary of Defense; military staff assistant, Defense Research and Engineering for Test and Evaluation, Office of the Secretary of Defense; and Director of Requirements (Support Systems), Office of the Deputy Chief of Staff for Operations and Plans. Kern also served as Team Chief, Light Combat Vehicle Team, Office of the Deputy Chief of Staff for Research, Development and Acquisition, and as the Program Branch Chief, Bradley Fighting Vehicle Systems, Warren, Michigan. He taught weapon systems and automotive engineering at the United States Military Academy and was the department's research officer.

In June 2004 Kern was chosen to head the internal military investigation of the Abu Ghraib torture scandal, also referred to as the Fay Report.

== Awards and decorations ==
Kern's awards and decorations include the Defense Distinguished Service Medal, Army Distinguished Service Medal, Silver Star, Defense Superior Service Medal, Legion of Merit (with oak leaf cluster), Bronze Star Medal (with Valor device and oak leaf cluster), Bronze Star Medal (with two oak leaf clusters), Purple Heart (with two oak leaf clusters), Meritorious Service Medal (with four oak leaf clusters), Army Commendation Medal, Parachutist Badge, and Ranger Tab.

- Defense Distinguished Service Medal
- Army Distinguished Service Medal
- Silver Star
- Defense Superior Service Medal
- Legion of Merit with oak leaf cluster
- Bronze Star Medal with Valor Device and oak leaf cluster, Bronze Star with three oak leaf clusters
- Purple Heart with two oak leaf clusters
- Meritorious Service Medal with four oak leaf clusters
- Army Commendation Medal
- Parachutist Badge
- Ranger Tab

== Post-military life ==
After retiring from the army in January 2005, Kern joined the Board of Directors of Agent Science Technologies, EDO Corporation and iRobot Corporation, and is a member of the External Advisory Board of the University of Michigan Department of Mechanical Engineering, and a Senior Counselor of The Cohen Group.

In 2007, Kern was elected a member of the National Academy of Engineering for bringing modern digitization technology to bear on military effectiveness, training, and procurement.

Kern now serves as the Chair of Advanced Technology in the Department of Civil and Mechanical Engineering at the United States Military Academy.
