= Carolyn Wood =

United States army officer

United States Army Captain Carolyn Wood is a military intelligence officer who served in both Afghanistan and Iraq. She was implicated by the Fay Report to have "failed" in several aspects of her command regarding her oversight of interrogators at Abu Ghraib. She was alleged by Amnesty International to be centrally involved in the 2003 Abu Ghraib and 2002 Bagram prisoner abuse cases. Wood is featured in the 2008 Academy award-winning documentary Taxi to the Dark Side.

Wood previously served ten years as an enlisted soldier in the U.S. Army, rising to the rank of Staff Sergeant, before being commissioned as an officer.

== Controversies ==
=== Bagram abuse controversy, December 2002 ===
In July 2002, Wood was in command of about 20 analysts and interrogators in the intelligence unit located at Bagram Collection Point. She expanded the interrogation procedures with the use of stress positions, isolation for up to thirty days, removal of clothing, and exploitation of detainees' phobias, such as the use of barking dogs.

Two prisoners, Dilawar and Habibullah, were killed in custody in December. When Military Police guards were charged with their beatings they tried to mitigate their responsibility by attempting to link the intelligence unit's expanded interrogation procedures as leading to such abuse. The MPs had been trained to use non-lethal force on violent and combative detainees, including painful peroneal strikes referred to as "compliance blows". These strikes are used in civilian law enforcement but were later determined to not be part of Army doctrine. Their arguments failed to exonerate them but was readily accepted by critics and opponents of the U.S. side in the war on terror.

Many of the enhanced interrogation procedures, such as the use of barking dogs, were later overturned after review by military lawyers. The practice of shackling a captive's hands above their heads was classified as criminal assault.

==== Invoked her right to protection against self-incrimination ====
Wood was called as a witness during the court martial of Willie Brand, the first GI to be charged. But, on legal advice, Wood invoked her right to protection against self-incrimination. The Arizona Daily Star quoted speculation over Wood's role, addressing the concern that Wood had been unaware of the most extreme abuse of her subordinates, and addressing the concern that Wood had merely passed on authorization for the abuse from more senior officers.

=== Abu Ghraib abuse controversy, August–December 2003 ===
Wood arrived in Abu Ghraib on August 4, 2003 and took the initiative to recommend the establishment of the Hard Site in Abu Ghraib based on her experience in Afghanistan.

The Hard Site was opened on August 25, 2003. This was intended as an isolation area to house detainees determined to be of intelligence value, but it was also used by MPs to isolate violent detainees. It became the location of the incidents that first provoked public controversy after criminal detainees were moved into the Hard Site for rioting, and then later revealed to have been humiliated by guards on the night shift.

As in Bagram, the accused guards claimed they were ordered to do this to soften detainees for interrogation. Wood testified in the pretrial hearing against Lynndie England that the conduct went far beyond the intelligence orders she had given to the MPs at Abu Ghraib.

England later admitted the intelligence rules had played no role in the incident, but the incident had already provoked a major Army inquiry into Army practices at Abu Ghraib.

Wood played a key role in drafting the interrogation rules that were issued from General Ricardo Sanchez's office on September 14, 2003.

These were revised twice more, on legal advice that the originals could lead to violations of the Geneva Conventions. Many techniques remained, however, and some were to be permitted on a case-by-case basis only with General Sanchez's authorization. The Army inquiry concluded there was confusion on this matter under Captain Wood's leadership, and some interrogation techniques continued to be used without the required authorization.

In testimony before the U.S. Senate Armed Services Committee:

Army Col. Marc Warren, a U.S. military lawyer, told the committee that Woods, who is a military intelligence officer, developed the list of techniques after researching methods "used by interrogators in other places," or described in "any document that we could find" on Army interrogation rules. Warren conceded that the methods Woods came up with, if used in certain combinations, "may very well ... violate the Geneva Conventions."

Wood's role at Abu Ghraib is featured in Alex Gibney's 2008 Academy award-winning documentary Taxi to the Dark Side.

==== Findings of the Fay/Jones Report ====
The Fay/Jones Report's final mention of Wood contained the following findings:

Finding: CPT Carolyn A. Wood, Officer in Charge, Interrogation Control Element (ICE), Joint Interrogation and Debriefing Center, 519 MI BDE A preponderance of evidence supports that CPT Wood failed to do the following:

- Failed to implement the necessary checks and balances to detect and prevent detainee abuse. Given her knowledge of prior abuse in Afghanistan, as well as the reported sexual assault of a female detainee by three 519 MI BN Soldiers working in the ICE, CPT Wood should have been aware of the potential for detainee abuse at Abu Ghraib. As the Officer-in-Charge (OIC) she was in a position to take steps to prevent further abuse. Her failure to do so allowed the abuse by Soldiers and civilians to go undetected and unchecked.
- Failed to assist in gaining control of a chaotic situation during the IP Roundup, even after SGT Eckroth approached her for help.
- Failed to provide proper supervision. Should have been more alert due to the following incidents:

- An ongoing investigation on the 519 MI BN in Afghanistan.
- Prior reports of 519 MI BN interrogators conducting unauthorized interrogations.
- SOLDIER29's reported use of nudity and humiliation techniques.
- Quick Reaction Force (QRF) allegations of detainee abuse by 519th MI Soldiers.

- Failed to properly review interrogations plans which clearly specified the improper use of nudity and isolation in interrogations and as punishment.
- Failed to ensure that Soldiers were properly trained on interrogation techniques and operations.
- Failed to adequately train Soldiers and civilians on the ICRP.

Recommendation: This information should be forwarded to CPT Wood's chain of command for appropriate action.

==== Courts Martial of the dog handlers ====
In late May 2006 Wood testified at the courts-martial of the Abu Ghraib dog handlers that all personnel at the prison had signed General Sanchez's memo authorizing extended interrogation techniques.

When asked if she would have approved the use of dogs against detainees Wood testified: "Using an unmuzzled dog goes against the CG's (commanding general's) policy."

== Military career ==
Captain Wood was awarded two Bronze Stars for the services she provided in Afghanistan and Iraq. According to a CBC documentary on Abu Ghraib a Bronze Star awarded to Wood following the deaths in custody was awarded for valor.

On January 22, 2003, Capt. Carolyn A. Wood receives a Bronze Star for “exceptional meritorious service” as the head of military intelligence interrogators at Bagram. She and her small platoon of 15 interrogators from the 519th Military Intelligence Battalion returned from Afghanistan to their base at Fort Bragg, North Carolina earlier in the month. On May 8, 2003, Wood receives her second Bronze Star According to an article published in The Guardian on June 23, 2004, six months after her withdrawal from Abu Ghraib, Wood was taking an advanced interrogation course at Fort Huachuca, the Army's primary intelligence training centre.The Guardian reported that although Wood hadn't been charged, she had been allocated a military lawyer.

According to the Arizona Daily Star on March 26, 2005 Wood was still stationed at Fort Huachuca.

According to the CBC, Carolyn Wood was only a First Lieutenant when her company was sent to Bagram, and her second Bronze Star was awarded after her return from Abu Ghraib. The CBC said, on November 16, 2005 that Wood was still an interrogation instructor at the Army's military intelligence instruction centre at Fort Huachuca.

As of October 2008, CPT Wood remains on Active Duty, assigned to the 501st Military Intelligence Brigade, and is the Company Commander of the Headquarters and Operations Company of the 527th Military Intelligence Battalion.

== See also ==
- Prisoner abuse
