= George Fay =

American army officer

- Lieutenant General Anthony Jones and Major General George Fay
- Occupation: Army officer
- Known for: lead author of an inquiry into torture and prisoner abuse

George Fay, while an officer in the United States Army, was the lead author of an investigation into the scandal at Abu Ghraib, more commonly known as the Fay Report.

In June 2004, Lieutenant General Ricardo Sanchez requested to be removed from oversight of the investigation and for an officer more senior than himself to replace Fay, when it became clear that he would need to answer questions regarding his role in the scandal. Military customs and procedures prohibited Fay from interviewing Sanchez because he was junior in rank. Fay was replaced by Lieutenant General Anthony Jones.

Fay was executive vice president, Worldwide P&C Claim, for CNA Financial in Chicago, from 2006 to 2015. In that capacity, he was "responsible for claim strategies and operations for CNA's Property & Casualty Operations worldwide."

He holds a Bachelor of Science degree in economics from St. Peter's College and an MBA in finance from St. John's University. He is a graduate of the U.S. Army Infantry School, Counterintelligence Officer Course, Aerial Surveillance Officer Course, Electronic Warfare Officer Course, the Command and General Staff College, and the U.S. Army War College.

== See also ==
- Carolyn Wood
