= Legal issues related to the September 11 attacks =

A number of incidents stemming from the September 11 attacks have raised questions about legality.

These include:

- Detentions of U.S. residents soon after the attacks.
- Detention and imprisonment of hundreds of people without charges and without following any previously defined standard, such as at Guantanamo Bay, Cuba.
- Extraordinary renditions.
- Certain actions to increase surveillance and to screen airline passengers.
- The U.S.-led invasion of Iraq.
- The Abu Ghraib prison scandal.
- Allegations of war crimes, including killings of noncombatants.
- Waterboarding and other allegations of torture.
- US citizens' extensive loss of civil rights under the USA Patriot Act.

== Detentions and imprisonment ==
=== Initial detentions ===
Soon after the attacks of September 11, 2001, the United States government began detaining people who fit the profile of the suspected hijackers: mostly male, Arabic or Muslim noncitizens. By late November 2001, more than 1,200 people had been detained and held incommunicado.

=== Guantanamo camps ===
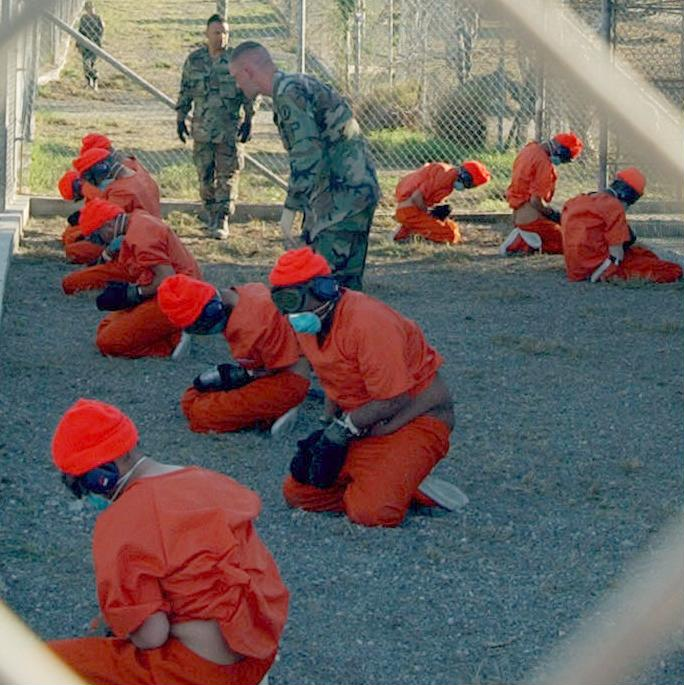
Detainees upon arrival at Camp X-Ray, January 2002

A major U.S. detainment facility is in Guantanamo Bay, Cuba. The facility is operated by Joint Task Force Guantanamo since 2002 at Guantanamo Bay Naval Base, which is on the shore of Guantánamo Bay. The detainment areas consist of three camps: Camp Delta (which includes Camp Echo), Camp Iguana, and Camp X-Ray, the last of which has been closed. The facility is often referred to as Guantanamo, or Gitmo.

After the Justice Department advised that the Guantanamo Bay Detention Camp could be considered outside U.S. legal jurisdiction, prisoners captured in Afghanistan were moved there beginning in early 2002. After the Bush administration asserted that detainees were not entitled to any of the protections of the Geneva Conventions, the U.S. Supreme Court ruled in Hamdan v. Rumsfeld on June 29, 2006, that they were entitled to the minimal protections listed under Common Article 3 of the Geneva Conventions. Following this, on July 7, 2006, the Department of Defense issued an internal memo stating that prisoners would in the future be entitled to protection under Common Article 3. The detainees held as of June 2008 have been classified by the United States as "enemy combatants".

On January 22, 2009, the White House announced that President Barack Obama had signed an order to suspend the proceedings of the Guantanamo military commission for 120 days and that the detention facility would be shut down within the year. But as of January 2012, the Guantanamo camp is still operating.

On January 29, 2009, a military judge at Guantanamo rejected the White House request in the case of Abd al-Rahim al-Nashiri, creating an unexpected challenge for the administration as it reviews how America puts Guantanamo detainees on trial.

As of January 6, 2025, 15 detainees remain at Guantanamo Bay.

President Barack Obama issued a Presidential Memorandum dated December 15, 2009, ordering the preparation of the Thomson Correctional Center, in Thomson, Illinois, so as to enable the transfer of Guantanamo prisoners there.

==== Proceedings: Comparison with the American justice system ====
Broadly speaking, the United States has two parallel justice systems, with laws, statutes, precedents, rules of evidence, and paths for appeal. Under these justice systems prisoners have certain rights. They have a right to know the evidence against them; they have a right to protect themselves against self-incrimination; they have a right to legal counsel; they have a right to have the witnesses against them cross-examined.

These two justice systems are the judicial branch of the U.S. government, and a slightly streamlined justice system named the Uniform Code of Military Justice, or UCMJ, for people under military jurisdiction. People undergoing a military court martial are entitled to the same basic rights as those in the civilian justice system.

The Guantanamo military trials do not operate according to either system. The differences include:

- The accused are not allowed access to all the evidence against them. The Presiding Officers are authorized to consider secret evidence the accused have no opportunity to refute.
- It may be possible for the commission to consider evidence that was extracted through coercive interrogation techniques before the enactment of the Detainee Treatment Act. However, legally the commission is restricted from considering any evidence extracted by torture, as defined by the Department of Defense.
- The appointing officer in overall charge of the commissions is sitting in on them. He is authorized to shut down any commission, without warning, and without explanation.
- The proceedings may be closed at the discretion of the presiding officer, so that secret information may be discussed by the commission.
- The accused are not permitted a free choice of attorneys, as they can use only military lawyers or those civilian attorneys eligible for the secret security clearance.
- Because the accused are charged as unlawful combatants, former Secretary of Defense Donald Rumsfeld stated that an acquittal on all charges by the commission is no guarantee of a release.

== Iraq War ==
A dispute exists over the legitimacy of the 2003 invasion of Iraq. The debate centers around the question whether the invasion was an unprovoked assault on an independent country that may have breached international law, or whether the United Nations Security Council authorized the invasion (whether the conditions set in place after the Gulf War allowed the resumption if Iraq did not adhere to the Security Council resolutions).

Those arguing for the war's legitimacy often point to Congressional Joint Resolution 114 and UN Security Council resolutions, such as Resolution 1441 and Resolution 678.

Those arguing against the war's legitimacy cite some of the same sources, stating they do not actually permit war but instead lay out conditions that must be met before war can be declared. Furthermore, the Security Council may only authorise the use of force against an "aggressor" in the interests of preserving peace, whereas the 2003 invasion of Iraq was not provoked by any aggressive military action.

There has been heated debate regarding whether the invasion was started with the explicit authorization of the United Nations Security Council. The Government of the United States believes that the invasion was explicitly authorized by Security Council Resolution 678 and thus complies with international law. There is no debate that Security Council Resolution 678 authorizes UN Member States "to use all necessary means to uphold and implement resolution 660 and all subsequent relevant resolutions and to restore international peace and security in the area.", just debate about what that resolution actually means.

The only legal jurisdiction to find "aggression" or to find the invasion illegal rests with the Security Council under United Nations Charter Articles 39-42. The Security Council met in 2003 for two days, reviewed the legal claims involved, and elected to be "seized of the matter". The Security Council has not reviewed these issues since 2003. The public debate, however, continues. Former UN Secretary General Kofi Annan expressed his opinion that the invasion of Iraq was "not in conformity with the UN charter ... from the charter point of view, ... [the invasion] was illegal."

=== Abu Ghraib ===
Beginning in 2004, accounts of physical, psychological, and sexual abuse, including torture, rape, sodomy, and homicide of prisoners held in the Abu Ghraib prison in Iraq (also known as Baghdad Correctional Facility) came to public attention. These acts were committed by personnel of the 372nd Military Police Company of the United States Army together with additional US governmental agencies.

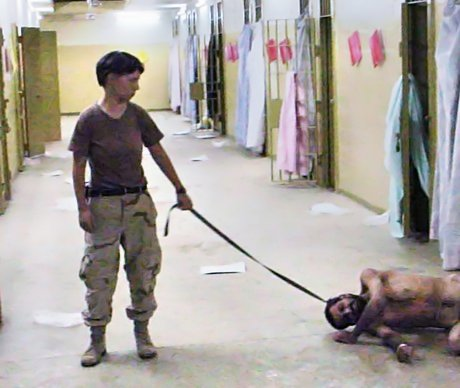
Lynndie England holding a leash attached to a prisoner, known to the guards as "Gus", who is collapsed on the floor.

As revealed by the 2004 Taguba Report, a criminal investigation by the United States Army Criminal Investigation Command had already been underway since 2003 where many soldiers of the 320th Military Police Battalion had been charged under the Uniform Code of Military Justice with prisoner abuse. In 2004 articles describing the abuse, including pictures showing military personnel abusing prisoners, came to public attention, when a 60 Minutes II news report (April 28) and an article by Seymour M. Hersh in The New Yorker magazine (posted online on April 30 and published days later in the May 10 issue) reported the story. Janis Karpinski, the commander of Abu Ghraib, demoted for her lack of oversight regarding the abuse, estimated later that 90% of detainees in the prison were innocent.

The United States Department of Defense removed seventeen soldiers and officers from duty, and eleven soldiers were charged with dereliction of duty, maltreatment, aggravated assault and battery. Between May 2004 and March 2006, eleven soldiers were convicted in courts-martial, sentenced to military prison, and dishonorably discharged from service. Two soldiers, Specialist Charles Graner, and his former fiancée, Specialist Lynndie England, were sentenced to ten years and three years in prison, respectively, in trials ending on January 14, 2005 and September 26, 2005. The commanding officer at the prison, Brigadier General Janis Karpinski, was demoted to the rank of colonel on May 5, 2005. Col. Karpinski has denied knowledge of the abuses, claiming that the interrogations were authorized by her superiors and performed by subcontractors, and that she was not even allowed entry into the interrogation rooms.

The abuse of detainees at Abu Ghraib was in part the reason that on April 12, 2006, the United States Army activated the 201st Military Intelligence Battalion, the first of four joint interrogation battalions.

== See also ==
- Authority for Use of Military Force to Combat Terrorist Activities Within the United States
