= Killing of Manadel al-Jamadi =

2003 extrajudicial killing of prisoner in Abu Ghraib, Iraq

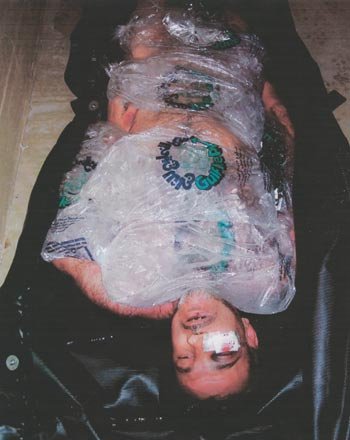
- Manadel al-Jamadi's corpse
- Location: Abu Ghraib prison, Abu Ghraib, Iraq
- Date: 4 November 2003; 23 years ago
- Attack type: Torture, homicide
- Weapon: Various
- Victim: Manadel al-Jamadi
- Charges: None

Manadel al-Jamadi (Arabic: مناضل الجمادي) was an Iraqi national who was killed by U.S. military servicemembers by being suspended by his wrists with his hands cuffed behind his back, a position condemned by human rights groups as torture, while he was in United States custody during a Central Intelligence Agency interrogation at Abu Ghraib prison on November 4, 2003. A military autopsy by the United States Army found al-Jamadi's death a homicide. In 2011, United States Attorney General Eric Holder said that he had opened a full criminal investigation into al-Jamadi's death. In August 2012, Holder announced that no criminal charges would be brought.

Al-Jamadi had been a suspect in a bomb attack that killed 34 people, including one U.S. soldier, and left more than 200 wounded in a Baghdad Red Cross facility. His name became known in 2004 when the Abu Ghraib scandal made headlines; his corpse packed in ice was the background for widely reprinted photographs of U.S. Army specialists Sabrina Harman and Charles Graner each offering a "thumbs-up" gesture.

== Circumstances of death ==
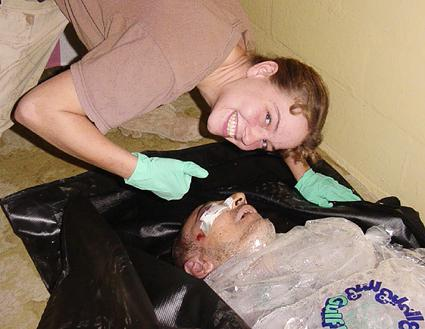
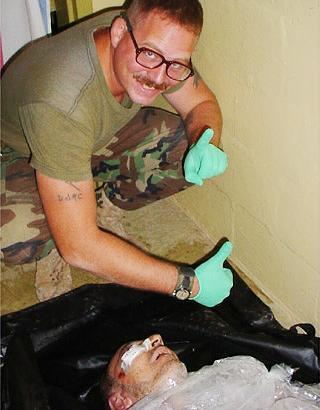
Sabrina Harman (top) and Charles Graner (bottom) pose over the body of al-Jamadi.

U.S. Navy SEALs had apprehended al-Jamadi following the 27 October 2003 bombing of Red Cross offices in Baghdad that killed 34 people, including one U.S. soldier, and left more than 200 wounded. At approximately 4:00 a.m. on 4 November 2003, al-Jamadi was led by American forces into the prison, naked from the waist down wearing only a purple shirt and jacket with a green sandbag over his head, while answering questions in both Arabic and English with his handlers.

A ghost prisoner (a detainee not logged in the records) said he was passive and nervous "like a scared child", and there was reportedly "no need to get physical with him", although an interrogator soon started shouting at him, demanding to know where weapons were hidden.

On 28 April 2004, photos taken by Jeremy Sivits and some other soldiers present in the prison were made public via CBS News.

The cause of his death was not generally known until 17 February 2005, when it was revealed that he had died after a fruitless half-hour interrogation, during which, contrary to official guidelines, he was suspended from a barred window by his wrists, which were bound behind his back. News reports called al-Jamadi's treatment Palestinian hanging torture. Associated Press correspondent Seth Hettena reported that 30 minutes after beginning his questioning of the prisoner, the CIA interrogator called for guards to reposition al-Jamadi, who he believed was "playing possum" as he slouched with his arms stretched behind him. But the guards found otherwise:

"After we found out he was dead, they were nervous", Specialist Dennis Stevanus said of the CIA interrogator and translator. "They didn't know what the hell to do."

According to Spc. Jason Kenner, an MP with the 372nd Military Police Company, al-Jamadi was brought by Navy SEALs to the prison in good health; Kenner says he saw that al-Jamadi looked extensively bruised when he was brought out of the showers, dead. According to Kenner a "battle" took place among CIA and U.S. military interrogators over who should dispose of the body.

Captain Donald Reese, company commander of the 372nd Military Police Company, gave testimony about al-Jamadi's death, saying of the dead prisoner, "I was told that, when he was brought in, he was combative, that they took him up to the room and during the interrogation he passed[...]. [The body] was bleeding from the head, nose, mouth." Reese stated that the corpse was locked in a shower room overnight and the next day was fitted with an intravenous drip; he said that this was an attempt to hide what occurred from other inmates. Reese said the body was then autopsied, establishing the cause of death as a blood clot from trauma.

Staff Sergeant Ivan Frederick wrote an account to his family in November 2003 that interrogators had "stressed him out so bad that the man died. [Prison personnel] put his body in a body bag and packed him in ice for approximately twenty-four hours in the shower. [...] The next day the medics came and put his body on a stretcher, placed a fake IV in his arm and took him away."

Al-Jamadi came to be known by some Abu Ghraib personnel as "The Iceman" and "Mr. Frosty." Others called him "Bernie," a reference to the movie Weekend at Bernie's in which a dead body is treated as if still alive.

== Investigation ==
In August 2007, Thomas Pappas, the most senior officer present during the interrogation and time of death, was granted immunity in return for his testimony at the court martial of his subordinate Lieutenant Colonel Steven L. Jordan, who was acquitted. In 2011, John Durham, Republican-appointed U.S. Attorney from Connecticut tasked with probing the CIA, had begun calling witnesses before a secret federal grand jury in Alexandria, Virginia, looking into, among other things, the death of al-Jamadi.

== In other media ==
Anthony Diaz, Jeffery Frost, Sabrina Harman, and Javal Davis are interviewed in the 2008 film Standard Operating Procedure about al-Jamadi's presence and corpse at Abu Ghraib.
