= The Hooded Man =

2003 Iraq War photograph

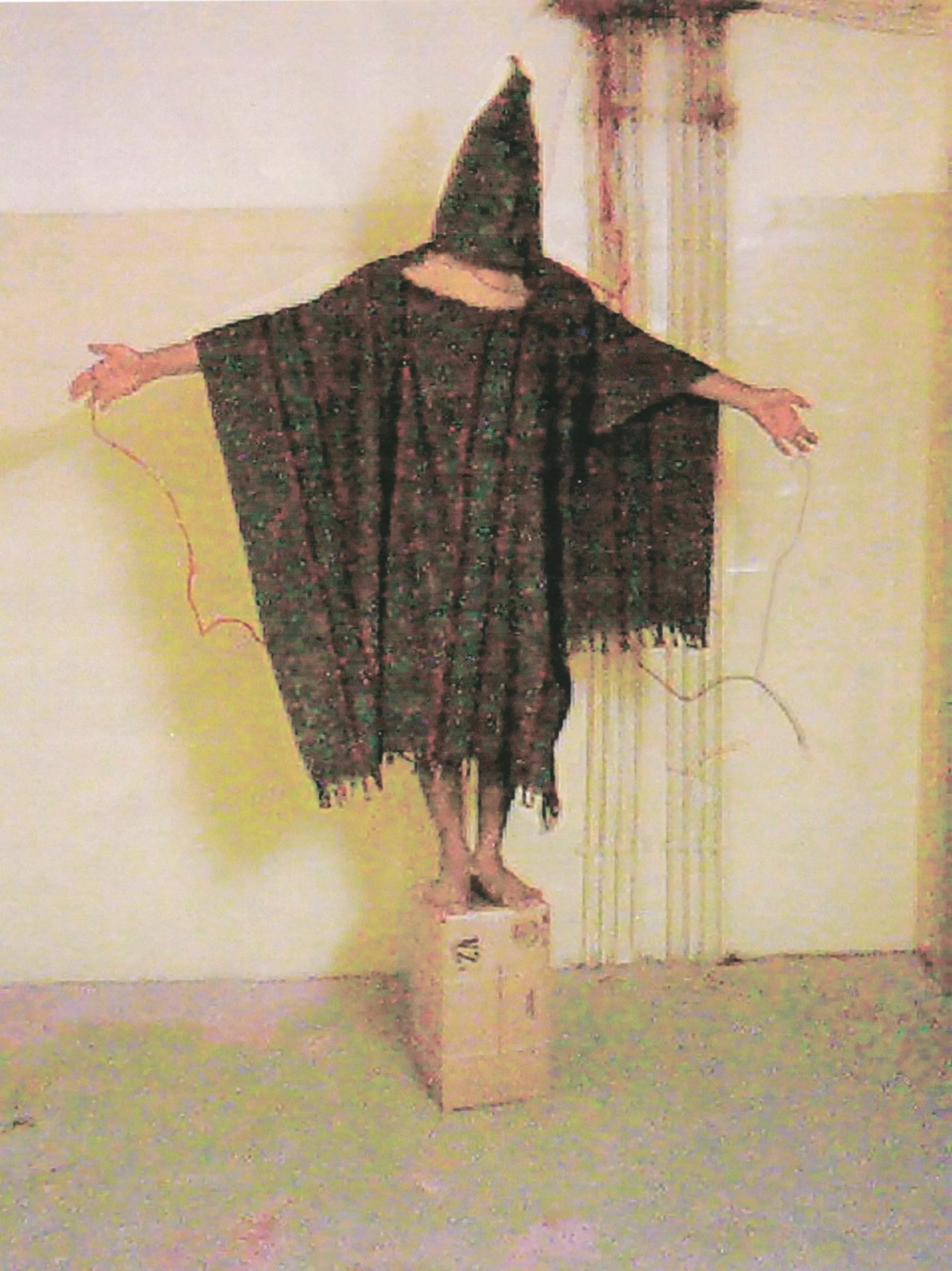
- Abdou Hussain Saad Faleh, an Iraqi prisoner, being tortured at Abu Ghraib prison by U.S soldiers; the prisoner is standing on a box with live electric wires attached to his left and right hands
- Artist: Staff Sgt. Ivan Frederick II
- Year: 2003
- Subject: Abdou Hussain Saad Faleh

The Hooded Man (or The Man on the Box) is an image showing a prisoner at Abu Ghraib prison with wires attached to his fingers, standing on a box with a covered head. The photo, taken by Staff Sergeant Ivan Frederick II, is considered an iconic photograph of the Iraq War, and has been written of as "the defining image of the scandal" and "symbol of the torture at Abu Ghraib". The image was first revealed to the public on CBS's 60 Minutes II program on 28 April 2004, after a delay requested by the US military. It was later published on the cover of The Economist's 8 May 2004 issue, as the opening photo of The New Yorker on 10 May 2004, and on the front page of The New York Times on 11 March 2006.

The man in the photo was initially reported to be Ali Shallal al-Qaisi but the online magazine Salon.com later raised doubts about his identity. It was later reported that although al-Qaisi was photographed in a similar position, the actual Hooded Man was Abdou Hussain Saad Faleh, nicknamed Gilligan.

== Subject ==
The man under the hood shown in the famous photo was initially reported as Ali Shallal al-Qaisi. Ali was detained at Abu Ghraib for several months between 2003 and 2004, where he was tortured by the U.S. forces. Ali was later released "on a highway away from Abu Ghraib" without being charged with a crime. In his description of the photographed scene, Shallal al-Qaisi states that he was standing on a rigid and "not breakable" box while he received electrical shocks via the wires tied to his hands. "I remember biting my tongue, my eyes felt like they were about to pop out. I started bleeding from under the mask and I fell down", Shallal al-Qaisi adds. "He said he had only recently been given a blanket after remaining naked for days".

The hooded man's identity was later challenged by the online magazine Salon.com after "an examination of 280 Abu Ghraib pictures it has been studying for weeks and on an interview with an official of the Army’s Criminal Investigation Command". Following the challenge, the New York Times stated it would investigate the case. Finally, the New York Times reported that "Qaissi acknowledged he is not the man in the specific photograph", though Qaissi and his lawyers say that while being shocked with wires, he was photographed in a similar position. During a phone conversation with the New York Times al-Qaisi said: "I know one thing. I wore that blanket, I stood on that box and I was wired up and electrocuted". The real identity of the hooded man was later reported to be Abdou Hussain Saad Faleh, nicknamed "Gilligan". The man was not recognized by tribal leaders or the manager of a brick factory located at the address indicated in prison records. It was noted that detainees often assume false identities during their time in custody.

== Publication ==
The photo, along with others depicting the abuse, was first revealed to the public on CBS's 60 Minutes II program on 28 April 2004. Broadcast had been delayed two weeks after Air Force General Richard Myers privately appealed to Dan Rather to consider the especially volatile situation in Fallujah. CBS eventually went ahead with the broadcast to avoid being scooped by the New Yorker.

It later appeared with the words "Resign, Rumsfeld" on the cover of the British magazine The Economist on 8 May 2004, and as the opening photo of Seymour Hersh's much-quoted essay on the scandal on 10 May in The New Yorker. It also appeared on the front page of the New York Times on 11 March 2006. An illustrated representation of the photo was published on the cover of The Nation on 26 December 2005 with the title "The Torture Complex". On 12 June 2005, the New York Times magazine published another reproduction with the title "What We Don't Talk About When We Talk About Torture."

== Reception ==
Frequent reproduction was not the sole reason behind the rise of The Hooded Man to an iconic status, rather it occurred also due to the diverse ways in which image makers have utilized it across different "genres, media, and locations". The image has served as a model for magazine covers and editorial cartoons, appeared in murals, public posters, and sculptures, been reproduced in Lego, and incorporated into montages and paintings.

W. J. T. Mitchell analyzed the Abu Ghraib photos in his book Cloning Terror: the War of Images 9/11 to the Present. The Hooded Man is reportedly one of the three iconic images from a larger set of leaked photos from Abu Ghraib, with the other two being "Pyramid of Bodies" and "Prisoner on a Leash".

A decade after the public release of the photos of the hooded man, the Abu Ghraib and the war on terror had been subject to numerous publications. It has inspired numerous adaptations across different media and genres, and significant literary works have delved into an analysis of the photograph, its adaptations, and its political significance.

Ambient musician Tim Hecker's 2013 album Virgins features album art alluding to the photo. The album also contains a track titled "Incense at Abu Ghraib".

== Similar torture cases ==
Der Spiegel, a German news outlet, concluded that many prisoners were tortured and photographed in the same manner as the hooded man. According to experts, this form of torture has been used by the CIA for years. Sworn testimony from Specialist Sabrina Harman of the 372nd Military Police Company states that at least one prisoner was tortured with their "fingers, toes and penis [...] attached to wires", while the infamous hooded man has wires attached only to his fingers. U.S. investigators say there were other prisoners, including Satar Jabir, claiming to be the hooded man, who had experienced the same torture method. In his interview with Der Spiegel, Ali Shallal al-Qaysi named two other people – Shahin, nicknamed "Joker" by the U.S. soldiers, and a man named Saddam al-Rawi – who suffered the same form of torture.

== See also ==
- List of photographs considered the most important
- Use of torture since 1948
- Criticism of the war on terror
- Firdos Square statue destruction
