= Prisoner abuse =

Mistreatment of imprisoned people by authorities

Prisoner abuse is the mistreatment of persons while they are under arrest or incarcerated. Prisoner abuse can include physical abuse, psychological abuse, sexual abuse, torture, or other acts such as refusal of essential medication, and it can be perpetuated by either fellow inmates or prison faculty.

== Forms of abuse ==
Abuse of prisoners can include physical abuse, as well as psychological forms of harm including verbal abuse, sleep deprivation, white noise, pointless/absurd or humiliating instructions, recurrent exhaustive inspections and shakedowns, arbitrary strip searches, and denuding actions.

=== Enablement of sexual violence ===
Prisoners are sometimes intentionally housed with inmates known to have raped other prisoners, or protection from known rapists may be purposely withheld from the prisoners. These practices create a very high incidence of rape in US prisons, which was the topic of the 2001 report No Escape from Human Rights Watch.

=== Strip searches ===
The experience of forced strip searches can be experienced as a traumatic event similarly to that of rape, especially when combined with habitual body cavity searches. The prevalence of CCTV in modern correctional facilities and the generally indiscreet nature of strip searches, often with a number of prison guards observing, usually adds to the experienced humiliation. Strip searches are often arbitrarily used under various pretences, when the actual ambition is to assert control and predominance as well as to intimidate the subjected prison inmates.

== Torture ==
Torture of prisoners includes any act, whether physical or psychological, which is deliberately done to inflict sensations of pain upon a person under the actor's custody or physical control. This form of prisoner abuse is usually exerted to extract information, but also as means of intimidation, attrition or punishment.

=== Enhanced interrogation ===
"Enhanced interrogation" is a euphemism for U.S. torture methods implemented in the war on terror purportedly needed to extract information from detainees. Examples include use of stress positions, sleep deprivation, starvation, thirst, and sexual humiliation.

== Abu Ghraib ==
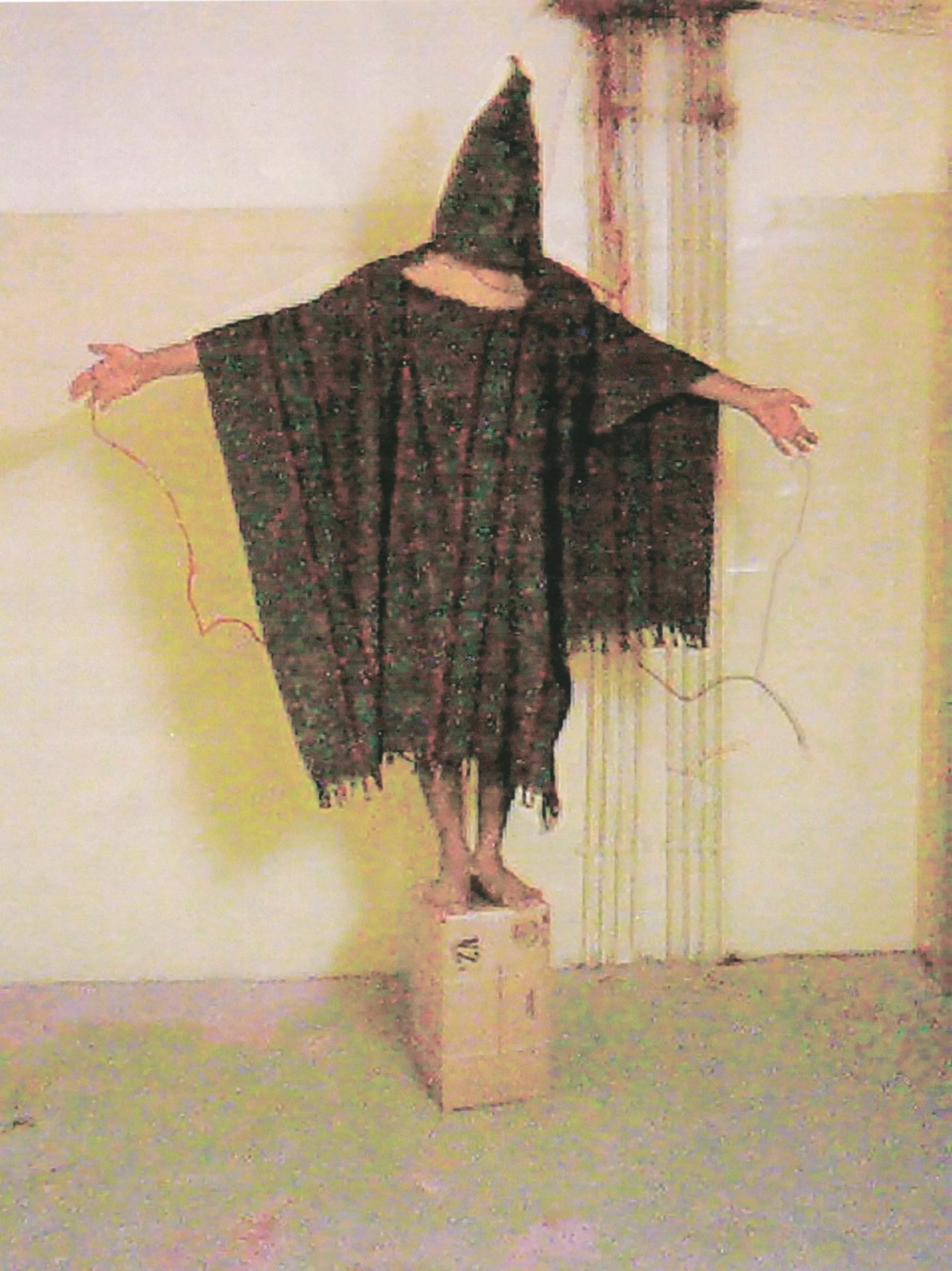
Known as The Hooded Man, this picture of Abdou Hussain Saad Faleh being tortured became an internationally famous symbol of the torture at Abu Ghraib and was featured on the cover of The Economist (see § Media coverage).

During the early stages of the Iraq War, members of the United States Army and the Central Intelligence Agency committed a series of human rights violations and war crimes against detainees in Abu Ghraib prison in Iraq. These abuses included physical abuse, sexual humiliation, physical and psychological torture, and rape, as well as the killing of Manadel al-Jamadi and the desecration of his body. The abuses came to public attention with the publication of photographs by CBS News in April 2004, causing shock and outrage and receiving widespread condemnation within the United States and internationally.

The George W. Bush administration stated that the abuses at Abu Ghraib were isolated incidents and not indicative of U.S. policy. This was disputed by humanitarian organizations including the Red Cross, Amnesty International, and Human Rights Watch, who claimed the abuses were part of a pattern of torture and brutal treatment at American overseas detention centers, including those in Iraq, in Afghanistan, and at Guantanamo Bay (GTMO). After 36 prisoners were killed at Abu Ghraib in insurgent mortar attacks, the United States was further criticized for maintaining the facility in a combat zone. The International Committee of the Red Cross reported that most detainees at Abu Ghraib were civilians with no links to armed groups.

Documents known as the Torture Memos came to light a few years later. These documents, prepared by the United States Department of Justice in the months leading up to the 2003 invasion of Iraq, authorized the use of certain torture techniques ("enhanced interrogation techniques") on foreign detainees. The memoranda also argued that international humanitarian laws, such as the Geneva Conventions, did not apply to American interrogators overseas. Several subsequent U.S. Supreme Court decisions, including Hamdan v. Rumsfeld (2006), overturned Bush administration policy, ruling that the Geneva Conventions do apply.

In response to the events at Abu Ghraib, the United States Department of Defense removed 17 soldiers and officers from duty. Eleven soldiers were charged with dereliction of duty, maltreatment, aggravated assault and battery. Between May 2004 and April 2006, these soldiers were court-martialed, convicted, sentenced to military prison, and dishonorably discharged from service. Two soldiers, found to have perpetrated many of the worst offenses at the prison, Specialist Charles Graner and PFC Lynndie England, were subject to more severe charges and received harsher sentences. Graner was convicted of assault, battery, conspiracy, maltreatment of detainees, committing indecent acts and dereliction of duty; he was sentenced to 10 years imprisonment and loss of rank, pay, and benefits. England was convicted of conspiracy, maltreatment of detainees, and committing an indecent act and sentenced to three years in prison. Brigadier General Janis Karpinski, the commanding officer of all detention facilities in Iraq, was reprimanded and demoted to the rank of colonel. Several more military personnel accused of perpetrating or authorizing the measures, including many of higher rank, were not prosecuted. In 2004, President George W. Bush and Defense Secretary Donald Rumsfeld apologized for the Abu Ghraib abuses.

== Right to health ==
According to international laws, a State is liable to ensure prisoners' right to receive health care. Prison authorities are fully responsible to provide proper medical treatment to the detainees and ensure their well-being.

=== COVID-19 pandemic ===
During the COVID-19 pandemic, the overcrowded Jaw prison of Bahrain witnessed a major COVID-19 outbreak. Several prisoners were confirmed to be infected with the virus, while the authorities failed to facilitate them with proper preventive medical supplies, including face masks or hand sanitizers, and conducting regular screening tests. The authorities fell short of ensuring prisoners' rights to health and following the rules of treating prisoners. One of the main concerns had been the extensive population of the prison, which made social distancing impossible. On 9 June 2021, an inmate of Jaw prison, Husain Barakat, died due to COVID-19 complications. Even after the pandemic, Bahrain's Jaw prison remained controversial, where prisoners' rights of health continued to be violated. In June 2022, Amnesty International reported that Bahraini authorities failed to respond to the inmates suffering with tuberculosis. Prison authorities constantly disregarded the prisoners with symptoms and did not allow them to get tested for the airborne disease. Some of the prisoners were called back to the prison after they were confirmed of being infected in the hospital. One of the prisoners, Ahmed Jaber, was not sent to the hospital until he was semi-paralysed after being sick for 11 months.

== See also ==
- Abu Ghraib torture and prisoner abuse
- Prisoner abuse in the United States
- Prison overcrowding
- Extermination through labor
- Penal harm
- Police misconduct
- Prisoners' rights
- Death in custody
- Stun belt
