= Jeremy Sivits =

American soldier (1979–2022)

- Born: Jeremy Charles Sivits; December 10, 1979; Jonesboro, Arkansas, U.S.
- Died: January 16, 2022 (aged 42); Roaring Spring, Pennsylvania, U.S.
- Military career
- Allegiance: United States
- Branch: United States Army
- Service years: 2001–2004
- Rank: Private
- Units: 372nd Military Police Company
- Conflicts: Iraq War; Operation Iraqi Freedom; Occupation of Iraq

Jeremy Charles Sivits (December 10, 1979 – January 16, 2022) was a United States Army reservist. He was one of several soldiers charged and convicted by the U.S. Army in connection with the 2003–2004 Abu Ghraib prisoner abuse scandal in Baghdad, Iraq, during and after the 2003 invasion of Iraq. Sivits was a member of the 372nd Military Police Company during this time.

Sivits took photographs at the Abu Ghraib prison which became notorious after being aired on 60 Minutes II. His father, Daniel Sivits, a former serviceman, said that he was trained as a mechanic, not a prison guard, and that he "was just doing what he was told to do". Sivits was the first soldier convicted in connection with the Abu Ghraib incidents.

He died from COVID-19 in Roaring Spring, Pennsylvania, on January 16, 2022, at age 42, during the COVID-19 pandemic in Pennsylvania.

== Court martial ==
On May 5, 2004, Sivits was charged under Uniform Code of Military Justice with conspiracy to maltreat detainees, maltreatment of detainees, and dereliction of duty for negligently failing to protect detainees from abuse, cruelty and maltreatment. His special court-martial was held on May 19, 2004, in Baghdad.

Sivits pleaded guilty and testified against some of his fellow soldiers. Sivits' testimony included reporting seeing Charles Graner punching a naked detainee "with a closed fist so hard in the temple that it knocked the detainee unconscious". Sivits also testified seeing Lynndie England stomping on the feet and hands of detainees with her boots. Human Rights Watch and other human rights groups were not permitted to attend the trial.

The court martial sentenced Sivits to the maximum sentence, one year of confinement, in addition to being discharged for bad conduct and demoted from specialist to private.

After the Army, although a mechanic by trade, Sivits worked as a substance abuse counselor. In a 2018 interview, Sivits showed remorse for his actions, saying that he "hate[s] himself".

== See also ==
- Megan Ambuhl
- Ivan Frederick
- Sabrina Harman
- Standard Operating Procedure (film)
