= Ivan Frederick =

American war criminal (born 1966)

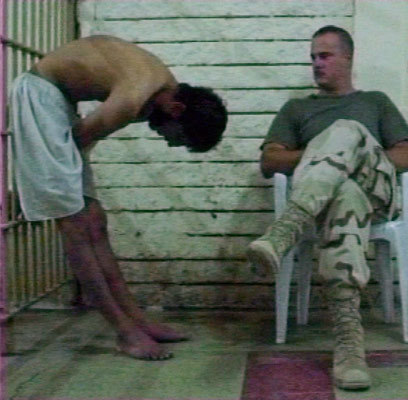
- Ivan Frederick interrogating a bound detainee in Abu Ghraib prison
- Born: 1966 (age 59–60); Buckingham County, Virginia, U.S.
- Status: Released
- Convictions: Maltreating detainees Conspiracy to maltreat detainees Dereliction of duty Assault; Indecent acts
- Penalty: 8 years imprisonment plus a dishonorable discharge
- Military career
- Allegiance: United States of America
- Branch: United States Army (Dishonorably discharged)
- Service years: 1984–2004
- Rank: Private
- Units: 372nd Military Police Company
- Conflicts: Iraq War; Operation Iraqi Freedom; Occupation of Iraq

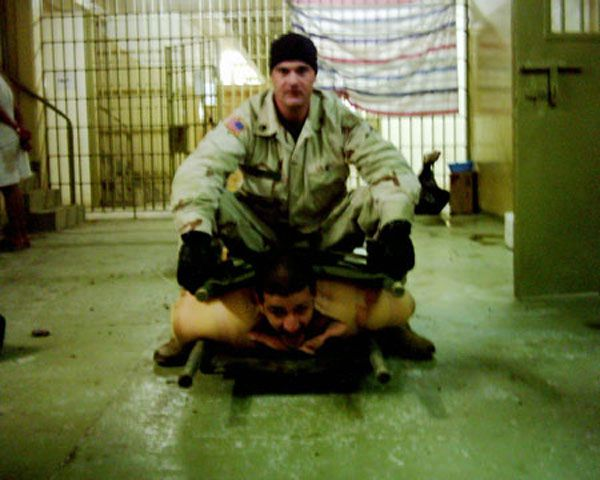
Frederick sitting on an Iraqi detainee between two stretchers in Abu Ghraib prison

Ivan "Chip" Frederick II (born 1966) is an American war criminal and former soldier who was court-martialed for prisoner abuse after the 2003–2004 Abu Ghraib prisoner abuse scandal. Along with other soldiers of his Army Reserve unit, the 372nd Military Police Company, Frederick was accused of allowing and inflicting sexual, physical, and psychological abuse on Iraqi detainees in Abu Ghraib prison, a notorious prison in Baghdad during the United States' occupation of Iraq. In May 2004, Frederick pleaded guilty to conspiracy, dereliction of duty, maltreatment of detainees, assault, and indecent acts. He was sentenced to 8 years' confinement and loss of rank and pay, and he received a dishonorable discharge. He was released on parole in October 2007, after spending four years in prison.

Frederick was a staff sergeant and the senior enlisted soldier at the prison from October to December 2003. Prior to his deployment to Iraq, Frederick was a corrections officer at Buckingham Correctional Center in Dillwyn, Virginia.

== See also ==
- Charles Graner
- Lynndie England
- Jeremy Sivits
- Megan Ambuhl
- Standard Operating Procedure (film)
