= Joe Darby =

Whistleblower in the Abu Ghraib torture scandal

Joseph Darby
- Born: Joseph M. Darby; June 23, 1979 (age 47); Cumberland, Maryland
- Military career
- Allegiance: United States
- Branch: United States Army
- Service years: 1996–2006
- Rank: Sergeant
- Unit: 372nd Military Police Company
- Conflicts: Iraq War: Operation Iraqi Freedom

Sergeant Joseph M. Darby (born c. 1979) is a former U.S. Army reservist known as the whistleblower in the Abu Ghraib torture and prisoner abuse scandal. Darby is a graduate of North Star High School, near his hometown at the time, Jenners, Pennsylvania.

At the time, Darby served as an M.P. at the Abu Ghraib prison, in Abu Ghraib, Iraq. After learning of the abuse, Darby was the first person to take steps to alert the U.S. military command.

== Disclosure of abuses at Abu Ghraib ==
In January 2004, Darby provided two CD-ROMs of photographs to Special Agent Tyler Pieron of the U.S. Army Criminal Investigation Command, who was stationed at Abu Ghraib Prison, triggering an investigation that led to the implication of several soldiers violating the Geneva Convention. Darby initially wanted to remain anonymous, and had been assured of anonymity — he and those implicated all served in the 372nd Military Police Company, but became known when The New Yorker published his name and when later Donald Rumsfeld named him during a Senate hearing. This led to harassment and death threats against him and his family, resulting in them being taken into protective custody by the U.S. Army. Darby had agonized for a month beforehand, but finally decided to blow the whistle on his former friends explaining: "It violated everything I personally believed in and all I'd been taught about the rules of war." He had known Lynndie England, one of the most well-known suspects, since Basic Training. He testified that he had received the photos from Charles Graner, another soldier in the photographs.

=== Reactions ===
The disclosure was not received well by the community in which Darby and his wife, Bernadette, were living in Maryland. They have been shunned by friends and neighbors, their property has been vandalized, and they now reside in protective military custody at an undisclosed location. Bernadette said, "We did not receive the response I thought we would. People were, they were mean, saying he was a walking dead man, he was walking around with a bull's-eye on his head. It was scary."

On the other hand, CBS reports that former neighbors from one of his childhood homes in Pennsylvania were proud of him. Darby has also said that soldiers in his unit shook his hand afterward.

=== Recognition ===
On May 7, 2004, Darby was profiled as the "Person of the Week" by anchor Peter Jennings on ABC's World News Tonight, and in December 2004, he was selected as one of three ABC News "People of the Year". He was profiled and interviewed by Anderson Cooper on the December 10, 2006, broadcast of 60 Minutes (the segment was aired again on June 24, 2007).

Darby received a John F. Kennedy Profile in Courage Award on May 16, 2005, in recognition of his courage in exposing the abuses at Abu Ghraib.

Donald Rumsfeld sent Darby a personal letter, apologizing for the disclosure, stating that he had no malicious intent and was not aware that Darby had been promised anonymity.

== See also ==
- Ronald Ridenhour (alerted authorities to the My Lai massacre)
