= Standard Operating Procedure (film) =

2008 documentary film by Errol Morris

- Theatrical release poster
- Directed by: Errol Morris
- Written by: Errol Morris
- Produced by: Julie Ahlberg
- Cinematography: Robert Chappell; Robert Richardson
- Edited by: Andy Grieve; Steven Hathaway; Dan Mooney
- Music by: Danny Elfman
- Production company: Participant Media
- Distributed by: Sony Pictures Classics
- Release date: April 25, 2008
- Running time: 118 minutes
- Country: United States
- Language: English
- Box office: $321,820

Standard Operating Procedure is a 2008 American documentary film written and directed by Errol Morris that explores the meaning of the photographs taken by U.S. military police at the Abu Ghraib prison in late 2003, the content of which revealed the torture and abuse of its prisoners by U.S. soldiers and subsequently resulted in a public scandal.

Commenting on the relationship of his film to the notorious photographs, Morris has said his intent was "…not to say that these 'bad apples' were blameless… but… to say that they were scapegoats. It was easy to blame them because, after all, they were in the photographs… Photographs don’t tell us who the real culprits might be… They can also serve as a coverup, they can misdirect us… Photographs reveal and conceal, serve as [both] exposé and coverup".

== Synopsis ==
An examination of the intended consequences of the Iraqi war with a focus on events at Abu Ghraib prison which began to appear in global media in 2004. The prison quickly became notorious for the photos of the abuse of terror suspects, their children, and innocent civilians by military men and women.

=== People featured in the film ===
==== Interviewed ====
- Janis Karpinski, Brigadier General, 800th MP Brigade
- Tim Dugan, Civilian interrogator, CACI Corps
- Sabrina Harman, Sergeant, Military Police
- Lynndie England, Private First Class, MP
- Javal Davis, Sergeant, MP
- Megan Ambuhl Graner, Specialist, MP
- Jeremy Sivits, Specialist, MP
- Brent Pack, Army Special Agent, CID
- Ken Davis, Sergeant, MP
- Tony Diaz, Sergeant, MP
- Jeffrey Frost, Specialist, MP
- Roman Krol, Specialist, Military Intelligence

==== In photographs ====
- Charles Graner
- Ivan Frederick
- Manadel al-Jamadi (Died during CIA interrogation)
- Satar Jabar

==== Re-enactors ====
- Christopher Bradley
- Sarah Denning
- Joshua Feinman
- Alim Kouliev

== Critical reception ==
On the review aggregator website Rotten Tomatoes, 79% of 107 critics' reviews are positive. The website's consensus reads: "Well researched and finely crafted, Standard Operating Procedure is another gem from master documentarian Errol Morris." Metacritic, which uses a weighted average, assigned the film a score of 70 out of 100, based on 31 critics, indicating "generally favorable" reviews.

The film appeared on several critics' top ten lists of the best films of 2008. Scott Tobias of The A.V. Club named it the 4th best film of 2008, J.R. Jones of the Chicago Reader named it the 7th best film of 2008, and Kenneth Turan of the Los Angeles Times named it the 8th best film of 2008 (in a two-way tie).

During the Berlinale 2008 it received the "Jury Grand Prix – Silver Bear".

== Controversy ==
Morris's practice of compensating his interview subjects has caused controversy, although it is not an unusual practice in documentary filmmaking, according to the producer Diane Weyermann, who also worked on An Inconvenient Truth. In a private interview during the Tribeca Film Festival, Morris said: "If I had not paid them, they would not be interviewed."

== Soundtrack ==
Standard Operating Procedure

Film score by Danny Elfman
- Released: 2006

Danny Elfman chronology
Charlotte's Web (2006)	Standard Operating Procedure (2006)	Wanted (2008)

Danny Elfman composed the film score for Standard Operating Procedure. The soundtrack is much different from Elfman's other scores as it includes electronics and distortion.

=== Track listing ===
1. "S.O.P. Theme #1: Standard Operating Procedure" – 5:56
2. "The Infamous Pyramid" – 3:48
3. "Photos" – 2:56
4. "The Shooter" – 3:26
5. "Dogs" – 3:42
6. "The Wolf" – 1:11
7. "Saddam’s Egg" – 3:30
8. "Main Titles: Vacation in Iraq" – 2:07
9. "S.O.P. Theme #2: Amnesty" – 1:33
10. "What Is Going on Here?" – 2:32
11. "Gilligan" – 3:02
12. "Story of the Ants" – 3:36
13. "The Table Breaker" – 1:00
14. "S.O.P. Theme #3: Feelings & Facts" – 5:26
15. "Unusual, Weird & Wrong" – 2:32
16. "A Bad Feeling" – 2:22
17. "Birdies" – 1:38
18. "S.O.P. End Credits" – 1:26
19. "Oli’s Lullaby" – 2:00

== See also ==
- 2008 in film
- 372nd Military Police Company, the MP unit assigned to Abu Ghraib
- Taxi to the Dark Side
- Torturing Democracy
