= Lists of legal issues =

List of lists of issues and controversies with the law

- Legal issues in airsoft
- Legal issues with fan fiction
- Burger King legal issues
- Legal issues and controversies surrounding Netflix
- Legality of cannabis
- Legal issues surrounding music sampling
- Legal issues related to the September 11 attacks
- Legal aspects of file sharing
