= 2003 Baghdad bombings =

2003 Baghdad bombings include:

- Jordanian embassy bombing in Baghdad, on August 7
- Canal Hotel bombing, on August 19
- 27 October 2003 Baghdad bombings
