= United States prison operations in the Iraq War =

During the Iraq War, occupying U.S. forces set up camps and converted existing prisons in Iraq to detain POWs, suspected terrorists, and insurgents who were opposed to the American occupation. While reports vary, from 2003 onwards U.S. troops stationed in Iraq detained more than 100,000 prisoners in the American-held detention complexes. Many of these detainments were later determined to be unlawful, and the treatment of the prisoners, inhumane. While the most prominent case of unlawful imprisonment, torture, and prisoner abuse occurred at Abu Ghraib prison, several other detainment centers were revealed to have operated in a similar fashion, most notably at Camp Bucca and Camp Cropper.

== Background ==
Abu Ghraib prison was constructed for the Iraqi government in the 1960s by British contractors. By the time of the Iraq War, it was under the control of Saddam Hussein's Ba'athist regime and held political enemies and minority populations that opposed the regime. Although not publicized and confirmed as explicitly as in the later 2004 leaks detailing American abuse of Iraqi prisoners, reports of extreme prisoner abuses, human experimentation, and mass executions were frequent and called out by humanitarian organizations such as Amnesty International. Following the U.S. overthrow of Hussein's regime, the prison was vacated and repurposed by U.S. forces to detain insurgents.

Camp Bucca was constructed by the British Military at the beginning of the Iraq War as a detention center for Iraqi POWs. Upon its transfer to U.S. forces, it was renamed after Ronald Bucca, an NYC fire marshal who was killed in the September 11 attacks. Nearing the end of the war, Camp Bucca was recorded to have upwards of 20,000 detainees, making it the largest prison in the world at the time. With its large prisoner population, Camp Bucca notably became a recruiting ground for the Islamic State.

Camp Cropper was initially set up as a high value detention (HVD) site and held Saddam Hussein for a brief time after his capture. Notably, it detained a large juvenile population in the years preceding U.S. withdrawal.

As of 2005, there were 16 operational, U.S.-occupied prisons in Iraq.

== U.S. occupation and use ==
=== Occupation ===
The overthrowing of Hussein's regime at the beginning of the Iraq War led to a power vacuum in which insurgency arose to oppose the occupying U.S. forces. U.S. engagement of insurgents in the Middle East at the time was guided by "COIN" doctrine, and military action included incapacitation strategy that reflected U.S. crime policy under the Reagan Administration. Incapacitation theory assumed potential insurgents' future criminality and justified preemptive detainment as a means to prevent terrorism and opposition. Under Operation Iraqi Freedom, American soldiers detained individuals that they determined posed a threat to national security or to occupying American forces. In addition to actual insurgents and Al-Qaeda affiliates, several thousand civilians were also captured and placed in camps, most notably at Camp Bucca and Camp Cropper, the two largest occupied prisons in the years following the publicization of leaked photos from Abu Ghraib.

=== Detention ===
Many detainees were captured simply for their physical proximity to insurgent activities. Upon embarking on The War on Terror, George W. Bush put forth memoranda declaring that detainees captured under suspicion of ties to the Taliban and Al-Qaeda were not entitled to POW rights per the Fourth Geneva Convention. The memoranda published were at the behest of the United States Department of Justice, under the reasoning that adherence to the Geneva Convention would limit the United States' efficacy in combating terrorism. The action was met with international backlash, particularly in light of revelations of the ongoings at the Guantanamo Bay detention camp. Despite affirming that the Geneva Conventions would apply during the occupation of Iraq, U.S. forces continually violated the Conventions, denying detainees legal representation, due process, and humane treatment.

American-occupied prisons were underequipped to handle the mass influx of detainees, lacking critical personnel such as linguists and guards. In some cases, military contractors who were untrained in detainee operations were hired to compensate for low personnel. The military staff at Abu Ghraib were advised to follow protocols established for use at Guantanamo Bay to obtain intelligence, contributing to the detainee abuse that made the prison infamous. Detainees who were captured and placed in detention camps were subject to verbal, physical, and sexual harassment and assault, the most egregious documented examples being outlined in leaked images and subsequent Taguba Report. Following further international backlash, the U.S. denied responsibility for the actions of individual guards and pushed for reform - at a press conference in 2008, U.S. Major General Stone (who oversaw the reform of the U.S. detention system in Iraq following the publicization of the atrocities committed at Abu Ghraib) noted the efforts made by the U.S. military to humanize the detainment facilities. These included offering vocational and educational programs in prison and fast-tracking releases for detainees who had committed no aggressions, posed no dangers, and had acted against the U.S. presence (if at all) for financial compensation, not on ideology. Under Stone's leadership, prison conditions reportedly improved by 2008 per interviews with prison personnel and with detainees.

Over the course of the Iraq War there were an estimated 5,500 to 26,000 Iraqi detainees at any time, with a reported increase from 7,000 prisoners in 2004 to as many as 51,000 in 2007.

== Withdrawal and aftermath ==
Leading up to the U.S. withdrawal from Iraq in 2011, detainees were gradually released or transferred to other prisons as camps were shut down and control was relinquished back to the Iraqi government. Many of the transferred detainees were juveniles. Over the course of the Iraq War, U.S. detention centers inevitably served as a recruiting ground for Al-Qaeda followers, insurgents, and sympathizers, as many of the longer-term prisoners were those denied release on ideological grounds. Many former detainees were radicalized while incarcerated in U.S. camps such as Bucca, fostering resentment of the U.S. due to the poor treatment they received while detained and interactions with radical jihadists detained in the same prison. The terrorist analyst organization The Soufan Group reported in 2014 that nine of the Islamic State's top leaders had been incarcerated together at Camp Bucca, including Abu Bakr al-Baghdadi, the first caliph of the IS. Other persons of note who were at Bucca and likely interacted with al-Baghdadi included his immediate successor, Abu Ibrahim al-Hashimi al-Qurashi, his second-in-command, Abu Muslim al-Turkmani, ISIL leader Haji Bakr and Lashkar-e-Taiba leader Abu Qasim. In 2008, more than half of the 33,600 detainees at the time were released as the United States shuttered camps and prisons. As the United States withdrew and thousands of prisoners were released, Iraq saw an uptick in attacks endorsed by Al-Qaeda, marking the beginning of the rise of ISIS.

By 2009, U.S. forces had transferred nearly all prisons in Iraq back to the Iraqi government, and fully withdrew from Iraq in 2011.

== List of prisons ==
See: Prisons in Iraq
