= Megan Ambuhl =

American war criminal

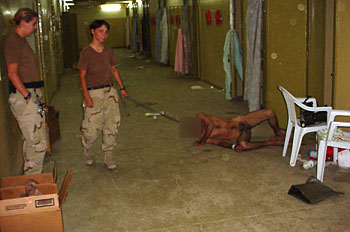
- Ambuhl (left) observing as Lynndie England holds a detainee known as "Gus" on the ground as he refuses to leave his cell.
- Born: 1974 or 1975 (age 51–52); Centreville, Virginia, U.S.
- Occupation: Soldier (formerly)
- Spouse: Charles Graner (m. 2005)
- Conviction: Dereliction of duty
- Penalty: Dishonorable discharge; Loss of half a month's pay; Demoted to Private from Specialist

Megan Ambuhl (born 1974 or 1975) is an American war criminal and former United States Army Reserve soldier who was convicted of dereliction of duty for her role in the prisoner abuse that occurred at Abu Ghraib prison, a notorious prison in Baghdad during the United States' occupation of Iraq.

== Early life ==
Ambuhl was born in Centreville, Virginia. She graduated from high school in 1992 and attended Coastal Carolina University, where she received an Associate of Science degree in biology.

== Military service ==
Ambuhl entered military service on January 31, 2002. She attended One Station Unit Training at Fort Leonard Wood in Missouri, completing basic training around June 23, 2002. After completing Military Occupational Specialty training, she was released from active duty on August 23, 2002. In civilian life, Ambuhl was a histology technician at LabCorp in Herndon, Virginia.

Including Delayed Entry time, Ambuhl served in the United States Army Reserve for two years and nine months. On February 21, 2003, Ambuhl was activated for service in the Iraq War. In a stipulation made during court-martial proceedings, Ambuhl wrote that she "received Geneva Convention and UCMJ training during an approximately 60–90 minute block of instruction in basic training, but cannot remember any specifics of those classes."

Ambuhl was originally assigned to the 352nd Military Police Company, but was involuntarily transferred to the 372nd Military Police Company. The 372nd Company spent three months training at Fort Lee, Virginia on Law and Order Missions.

In May 2003, Ambuhl and the 372nd Company arrived in Kuwait, proceeding north to Al Hillah in Iraq, where the company "was responsible for, among other things, assisting and training the Iraqi Police in the surrounding area." On October 15, 2003, the company assumed duties at the Baghdad Central Confinement Facility (BCCF, better known as the Abu Ghraib prison) 12 miles west of Baghdad.

== Involvement in prisoner abuse ==
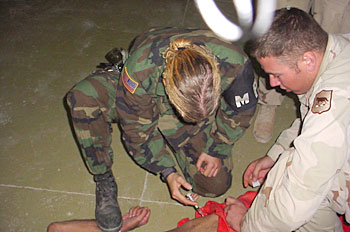
Megan Ambuhl forces an injection into a bound detainee

From October 2003 to January 2004, Ambuhl worked at Abu Ghraib, primarily as a night shift guard for Tier 1B, which housed "certain sub-categories of civilian detainees – including women, juveniles, and detainees suspected of psychiatric/psychological problems or mental instability," as well as "detainees that had caused serious disciplinary problems." Ambuhl's particular responsibility was to guard women and juveniles in Tier 1B. The 372nd Company was not trained in internment and resettlement (IR).

In her stipulation, Ambuhl admitted that between October 20 and December 1, 2003, she was derelict of duty in that she had "willfully failed to protect Iraqi detainees from abuse, cruelty, and maltreatment." Specifically, Ambuhl stipulated that she witnessed "numerous acts" of abuse, cruelty, and maltreatment, writing that "This time was very confusing for me, and things were done to detainees that I questioned, but that apparently were permissible. But there were some things that were done that I knew were wrong at the time, and I did not act to stop this behavior to protect the detainees."

Ambuhl was served with a court-martial in August 2004 in connection with prisoner abuse at Abu Ghraib. She was represented by a Washington, D.C.-based civilian lawyer, Harvey J. Volzer. A June 2004 Newsday article reported that Ambuhl, who had not yet appeared in any of the released photographs, was not involved in the incidents at Abu Ghraib:

A key part of the defense being prepared by Harvey Volzer, a lawyer for Spc. Megan Ambuhl, who England and another soldier both have said was not directly involved in the abuse. Volzer will argue Ambuhl could not have been derelict in her duty to guard prisoners because the memos show that the government believed the rough treatment to get information was justified. "We have multiple legal memoranda ... condoning what these people did," he said.

In a Pittsburgh Post-Gazette article, Volzer was quoted as saying:

They don't have a case against her. They really don't ... She's not in any of the photographs you've seen or in any of the ones you haven't. She's not mentioned in any of the statements of doing anything other than being there. She's being charged because everybody on the night shift was being charged.

Ambuhl appears in several of the photos relating to the prisoner abuse at Abu Ghraib, published by Salon.com in March 2006, observing the incidents of abuse or administering injections. However, none of the photographs published by Salon appear to show her directly engaged in prisoner abuse.

As part of a plea agreement, Specialist Ambuhl was convicted by court-martial on October 30, 2004, for dereliction of duty. In punishment, she was demoted to Private, discharged from the Army, and docked half a month's pay. Additional charges brought against Ambuhl were dropped following a pretrial guilty plea but had included allegations of conspiracy, maltreatment, and indecent acts. She was the third MP reservist and fourth U.S. soldier convicted in the Abu Ghraib prisoner abuse scandal.

== Marriage to Charles Graner ==
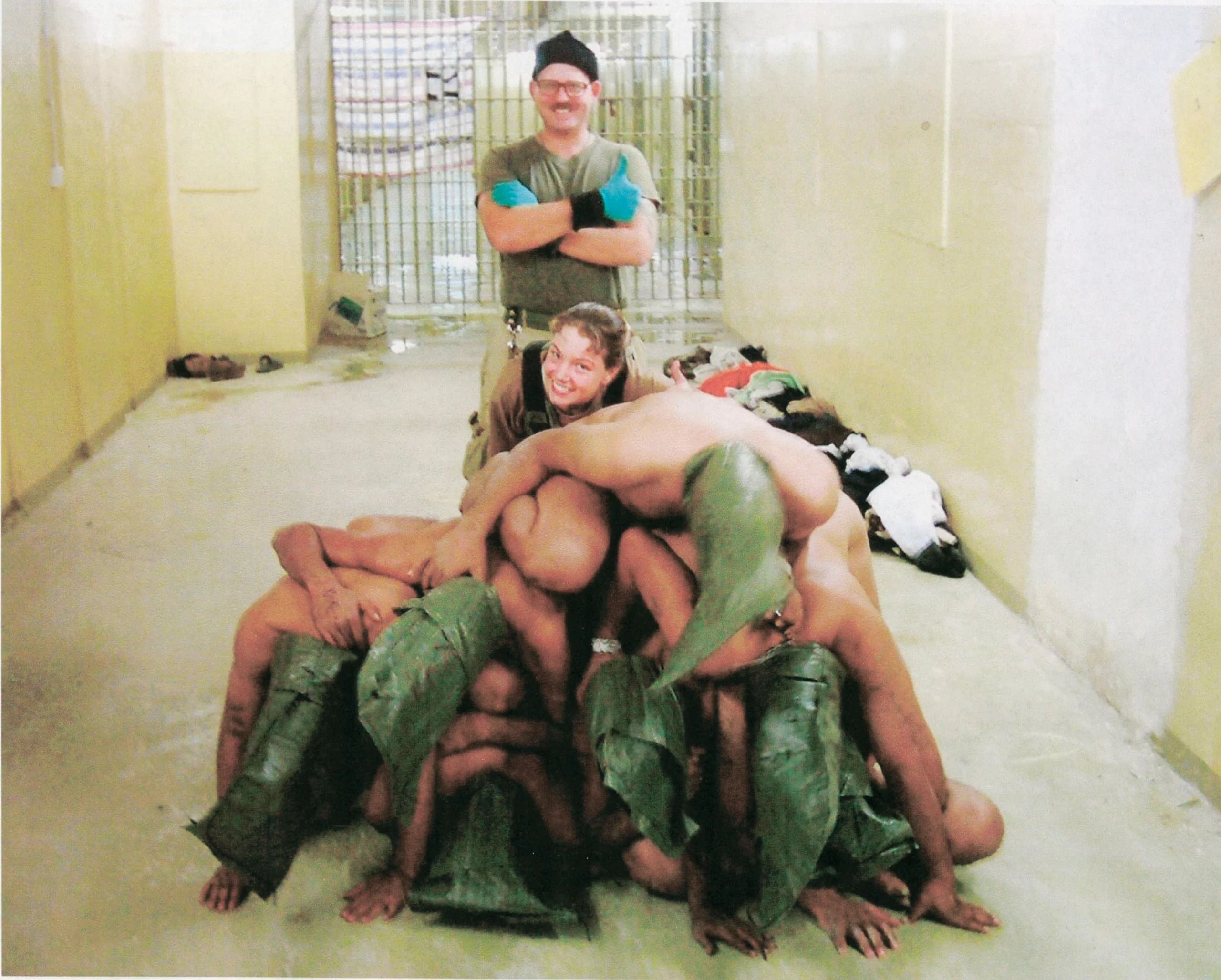
Ambuhl's later husband Charles Graner and Sabrina Harman with naked and hooded prisoners who were forced to form a human pyramid

In April 2005, she married Charles Graner, who was serving time for his role in the Abu Ghraib scandal. Graner had earlier been in a relationship with another soldier, Lynndie England and had one child with her.

Because Ambuhl was not permitted to see him for the first 2½ years of his incarceration, it was a proxy wedding.

From 2005 onwards, she ran the now-defunct website, www.supportmpscapegoats.com (archived link), where she posted documents in support of her husband's innocence. In a Washington Post web interview, she also stated: "[Graner] should be let out now because he and the others in prison have served more prison time than any other soldier sentenced for similar cases [...] including murders."

== See also ==
- Standard Operating Procedure – 2008 documentary film by Errol Morris
