= Penal harm =

Notion that prisoners should be made to suffer

Penal harm refers to a form of punishment that posits that inmates should endure additional pain and suffering beyond just having their basic rights taken away. This concept encompasses a range of unpleasant and miserable conditions and injuries harsher than mere "deprivation of liberty". These are justified by a certain ideology regarding custodial sentences, which are mainly served in prison or a reformatory.

== Overview ==
Proponents of penal harm state that the purpose is to prevent offending in order to stop further penal harm.

Traditional forms include:

- hard labor
- rationed, unappetizing or even unhealthy food
- various discomforts such as poor hygiene, small and overcrowded cells, hard bunks, insufficient protection against cold
- long isolation, even in a dark 'hole'
- sleep deprivation
- humiliating procedures such as strip searches
- prison rape
- denial of visits, correspondence and recreation.

== Criticism ==
There is poor evidence to suggest that penal harm has a deterrent effect once an offender's imprisonment is over. It forms a controversial appendage of a body of theory known as retribution; its perception as cruelty rather than justice may endanger both internal security and prospects for rehabilitation and goes against the humane ideal of most human rights advocates, possibly qualifying legally as inhumane punishment, an infringement on human rights under the UN rules.

Although internal punishments, imposed by prison authorities, are not strictly penal harm as such, since they are not independent from the convict's behavior, arbitrary application and choice of cruel modes, including corporal punishment (in South East Asian countries this can include rattan caning), perfectly fit the rationale.

In the 1990s and 2000s, penal harm has taken (among other things) the form of poor health care for inmates; this includes the denial of medicine for patients diagnosed with HIV/AIDS.

Penal harm can also arise unintentionally, as a result of understaffing, insufficient budget, or even legal considerations (such as delays deemed necessary for appeal procedures).

== See also ==
- Extrajudicial punishment
- Prisoner abuse
- Prisoners' rights
- Law and order (politics)
