= Strappado =

Torture method

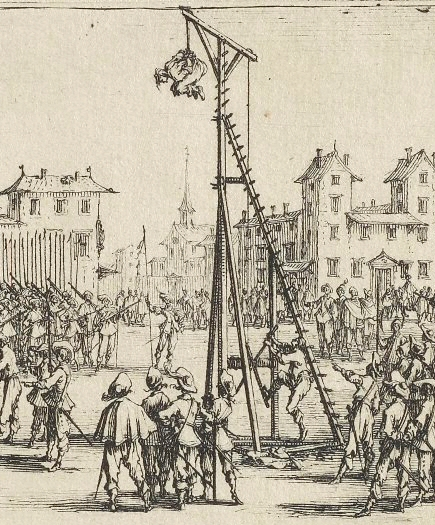
The strappado, used as public punishment; detail of plate 10 of Les Grandes Misères de la guerre by Jacques Callot, 1633

The strappado, also known as corda, is a form of torture in which the victim's hands are tied behind their back and the victim is suspended by a rope attached to the wrists, typically resulting in dislocated shoulders. Weights may be added to the body to intensify the effect and to increase the pain. This kind of torture would generally not last more than an hour without rest, as it would likely result in death.

Other names for strappado include "reverse hanging", "Palestinian hanging", (Note: The term "Palestinian hanging" has occurred in English from at least the 1980s) and il tormento della corda (Italian: 'the torment of the rope'). It was employed by the medieval Inquisition and by many governments, such as the civil law court (1543–1798) of the Order of St. John at the Castellania in Valletta, Malta.

The proper application of the strappado technique causes permanent but not visible damage. The levels of pain and resistance vary by victim depending on the victim's weight and on any additional weights added to the body. It is not, as Samuel Johnson erroneously entered in A Dictionary of the English Language, a "chastisement by blows".

== Variants ==
There are two variants of this torture. In the first, victims have their arms tied behind their backs; a large rope is then tied to the wrists and passed over a pulley, beam or a hook on the roof. The torturer pulls on this rope until the victim is hanging from the arms. Since the hands are tied behind the victim's back, this will cause a very intense pain and possible dislocation of the arms. The full weight of the subject's body is then supported by the extended and internally rotated shoulder sockets. While the technique shows no external injuries, it can cause long-term nerve, ligament or tendon damage. The technique typically causes brachial plexus injury, leading to paralysis or loss of sensation in the arms. Prolonged suspension may eventually cause infarction of the muscles of the shoulder and chest wall and subsequent rhabdomyolysis, acute kidney injury, and eventual death.

The second variation, known as squassation, is similar to the first, but a series of drops are added, meaning that the victim is allowed to drop until their fall is suddenly checked by the rope. In addition to the damage caused by the suspension, the painful jerk would cause major stress to the extended and vulnerable arms, leading to broken shoulders. It is believed that this form of strappado was employed on Niccolò Machiavelli during his 1513 imprisonment after being mistakenly accused of conspiring against the Medici family in Florence, who were the recently installed rulers.

== History ==
According to William Godwin, Girolamo Savonarola was tortured by strappado multiple times before being put to death in a trial by ordeal (fire). However, Savonarola apparently renounced his confessions after being tortured, and he was sentenced to be burned at the stake.

== Modern instances ==
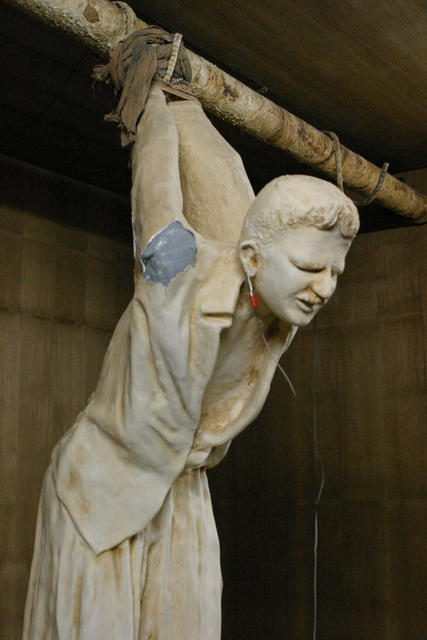
A sculpture depicting strappado

The "ropes" was one of several torture methods employed at the Hỏa Lò Prison, popularly known among Americans as the Hanoi Hilton during the 1964–1973 era of the Vietnam War. The site was used by the North Vietnamese Army to house, torture, and interrogate captured servicemen, mostly American airmen shot down during bombing raids. The aim of the torture was usually not to acquire information, but to break the will of the prisoners, both individually and as a group, and to extract written or recorded statements from the prisoners that would be critical of American conduct of the war and praise their captors.

According to a 1997 Human Rights Watch report, this technique was "widely employed" by the security forces of Turkey, where it is "usually used together with high-pressure water, electric shock, beating, or sexual molestation such as squeezing the testicles or breast or placing a nightstick against or in the vagina or anus." In 1996, the European Court of Human Rights found Turkey guilty of torture for its use of reverse hanging. Turkey has been admonished by Amnesty International and other international human rights groups concerning the use of the technique.

In 2003, one of the Bulgarian nurses interrogated during the HIV trial in Libya, Snezhana Dimitrova, stated that she had been tortured in this way.

They tied my hands behind my back. Then they hung me from a door. It feels like they are stretching you from all sides. My torso was twisted and my shoulders were dislocated from their joints from time to time. The pain cannot be described. The translator was shouting, "Confess or you will die here".

In November 2003, suspected terrorist Manadel al-Jamadi was tortured to death at Abu Ghraib prison during a Central Intelligence Agency interrogation by members of the U.S. military. It was revealed in February 2005 that al-Jamadi had died after 30 minutes of interrogation, during which he was suspended by the wrists bound behind his back.

Richard Belmar has stated that he was repeatedly subjected to this torture method as a punishment during his extrajudicial detention at the Parwan Detention Facility in Afghanistan from 2002 to 2005.

In 2017, video footage was released of Iraqi Army members inflicting strappado torture following successes in the Battle of Mosul.

In March 2023, the European Court of Human Rights found Ukraine (at the time under pro-Russian Prime Minister Viktor Yanukovych, who was later ousted as leader in the 2014 Euromaidan) in violation of the prohibition against torture, alleging that, in November 2003, police made use of strappado to coerce prisoner Mykola Slyvotskyy into falsely confessing his guilt for two murders that another person had previously confessed to committing.

Strappado is sometimes used as a variant of the helicopter position for torture in Eritrea as of the early 21st century.
