= Sabrina Harman =

American war criminal (born 1978)

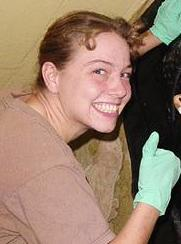
- Sabrina Harman posing over the body of Manadel al-Jamadi, an Iraqi prisoner who was tortured to death in United States custody during interrogation at Abu Ghraib prison in November 2003
- Born: Sabrina D. Harman; January 5, 1978 (age 48); Lorton, Virginia, U.S.
- Occupation: United States Army reservist
- Status: Released
- Convictions: Maltreating detainees (4 counts); Conspiracy to maltreat detainees Dereliction of duty
- Penalty: 6 months imprisonment plus a bad conduct discharge
- Military career
- Allegiance: United States
- Branch: United States Army; Military Police Corps; Army Reserve
- Service years: 2001–2005
- Rank: Private (formerly Specialist)
- Unit: 372nd Military Police Company
- Conflicts: Iraq War

Sabrina D. Harman (born January 5, 1978) is an American war criminal and former soldier who was court-martialed by the United States Army for prisoner abuse after the 2003–04 Abu Ghraib prisoner abuse scandal. Along with other soldiers of her Army Reserve unit, the 372nd Military Police Company, she was accused of allowing and inflicting physical and psychological abuse on Iraqi detainees in Abu Ghraib prison, a notorious prison in Baghdad during the United States' occupation of Iraq.

Harman was convicted of maltreatment of detainees, conspiracy to maltreat detainees, and dereliction of duty. She was sentenced to six months in prison, forfeiture of all her pay and benefits, demoted, and given a bad conduct discharge. She was imprisoned in the Naval Consolidated Brig, Miramar in San Diego, California.

Harman consistently acknowledged a fear that the abuses being committed at Abu Ghraib, both during her time at the facility and afterward, would help incite further radicalization in the region. During her sentencing, she also acknowledged having "failed my duties and failed my mission to protect and defend".

== Early life and education ==
Sabrina D. Harman was born on January 5, 1978, in Lorton, Virginia. Her father was a homicide detective. Harman graduated from Robert E. Lee High School in Springfield, Virginia.

== Military career ==
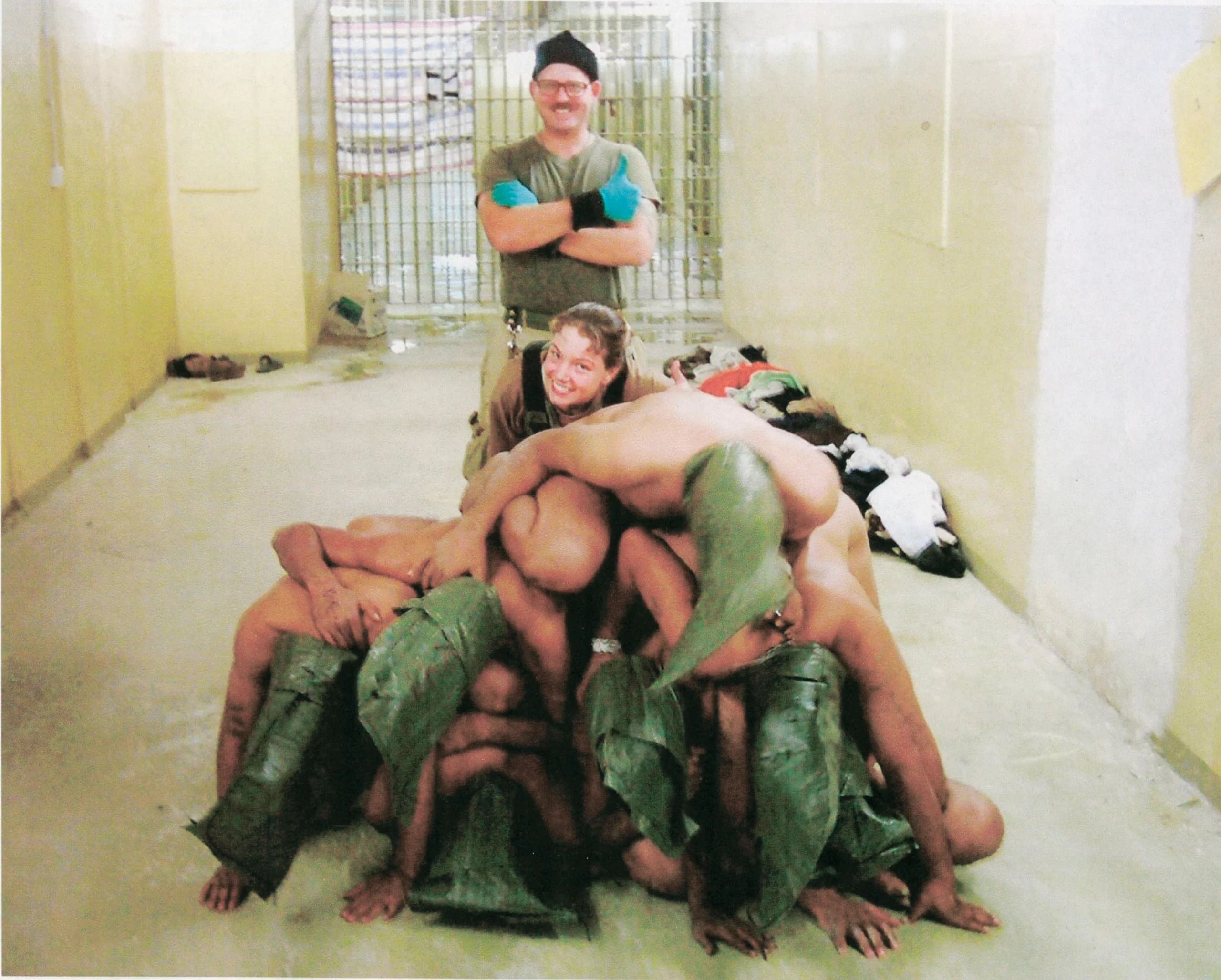
Sabrina Harman posing in a photo with Charles Graner behind a group of naked detainees stacked in a pyramid in Abu Ghraib

After the September 11, 2001 attacks, Harman joined the Army Reserve and was assigned to the Cresaptown, Maryland-based 372nd Military Police company. Harman worked for a time as an assistant manager at Papa John's in Alexandria, Virginia, before her company was activated for duty in Iraq in February 2003, and was deployed to Fort Lee, Virginia for additional training; however, this was in combat support, not internment and resettlement. Harman, an MP, was stationed at Abu Ghraib as a guard.

=== Abu Ghraib facility ===
Harman was the second soldier to be tried for mistreating prisoners at Abu Ghraib. She was depicted in several of the most notorious photos taken at Abu Ghraib in late October and early November 2003, and she is accused of taking other pictures.

In late October 2003, Harman wrote to Kelly Bryant, her roommate in Virginia whom she called her "wife", confessing her role in the abuse and expressing her discomfort with the experience.

Harman explained that her Military Police unit deferred to practices already being conducted by military officers and civilian contractors present at the facility:

[She] said she was assigned to break down prisoners for interrogation. "They would bring in one to several prisoners at a time already hooded and cuffed," Harman said in interviews by e-mail this week from Baghdad. "The job of the MP was to keep them awake, make it hell so they would talk." She said her military police unit took direction from the military intelligence officers in charge of the facility and from civilian contractors there who conducted interrogations.

== Sentencing ==
In 2005, Harman was convicted on six of the seven counts with which she had been initially charged, related to the maltreatment of detainees, conspiracy relating to abuse, and dereliction of duty; she was sentenced to six months in prison the following day, for which she would serve approximately four months due to credit for time already served. Following the conviction, Harman's rank was reduced from a specialist to a private.

Throughout the case, various individuals, including two former prisoners at Abu Ghraib, submitted testimonies in her defense proclaiming her innocent nature, which were officially accepted by the court. These prisoners noted Harman’s 'gentle' treatment of detainees, something unusual compared to other guards at the facility, who generally saw the prisoners more or less as a proxy for military intelligence – “She has no cruelty in her, even though she is an American woman, she was just like a sister.”

At her sentencing, Harman stated:

As a soldier and military police officer, I failed my duties and failed my mission to protect and defend. I not only let down the people in Iraq, but I let down every single soldier that serves today. My actions potentially caused an increased hatred and insurgency towards the United States, putting soldiers and civilians at greater risk. I take full responsibility for my actions. ... The decisions I made were mine and mine alone.

Harman's attorney said he hoped to see the military chain of command put on trial, rather than low-ranking reservists like Harman:

"I don't think we can even begin to imagine the kind of environment that she was in. First of all, she wasn't trained to be a prison guard, so she didn't even know the basic rules. She wasn't trained in military intelligence. I don't think any American can really truly appreciate the stress that existed along with the fact they were undermanned and not trained to perform this mission."

On February 4, 2010, the United States Court of Appeals for the Armed Forces unanimously upheld Harman's convictions.

== Later life ==
Harman spoke about her experiences at Abu Ghraib in the documentary film Standard Operating Procedure (2008).

== See also ==
- Standard Operating Procedure (film)
