= 27 October 2003 Baghdad bombings =

Red Cross compound suicide car bombings

Red Cross and police station bombings in Baghdad
- Part of Iraqi insurgency (2003–2006) during the Iraq War
- Location: Baghdad, Iraq
- Date: 27 October 2003
- Target: International Red Cross headquarters; 4 police stations
- Attack type: Suicide car bombs
- Deaths: 33 Iraqis; 1 U.S. soldier
- Injuries: 224
- Perpetrator: Unknown

On 27 October 2003, a series of suicide car bombings targeting the Red Cross headquarters and four Iraqi police stations occurred in Baghdad. The attacks killed 34 people and injured another 224.

The bombings began at approximately 8:30 am. All occurred within about 45 minutes of each other, and were also set to occur on the first day of Ramadan. Four suicide bombers died but the fifth and sixth, both Syrians, attempted to blow up a fourth police station, but had their plan foiled after their car apparently failed to explode. One was killed and the other was wounded by the Iraqi police and arrested. The Syrians set off a grenade, wounding one of themselves along with an officer.
