= 372nd Military Police Company =

- Active: 15 October 1942 – 14 June 1945; 26 June 1947 – 15 June 1959; 22 February 1972 – present
- Country: United States
- Allegiance: United States Army
- Branch: Military Police Corps
- Type: Separate company
- Garrison/HQ: Cumberland, Maryland
- Engagements: World War II: EAME: Naples-Foggia; Southern France; Rhineland; Central Europe; Southwest Asia: Defense of Saudi Arabia; Liberation and Defense of Kuwait; Cease Fire.

The 372nd Military Police Company is a Military Police Corps unit of the United States Army Reserve. It is based out of Cresaptown, Maryland. Eleven former members of the unit were charged and found guilty of war crimes in connection to the Abu Ghraib torture and prisoner abuse scandal during the Iraq War. Another member of the unit, Joe Darby, was awarded the Profile in Courage Award by the Kennedy family for exposing the prisoner abuse. The unit is credited with the capture and stabilization of the city of Hillah along with the 1st Marine Regiment. It was also responsible for guarding main supply routes used by American forces in Iraq.

== Unit history ==
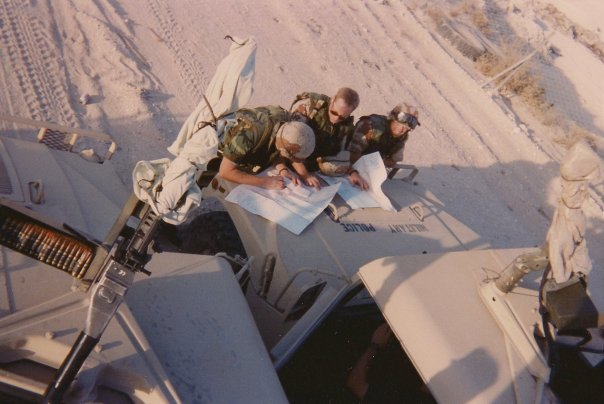
Three team leaders from the 372nd MP Company check their maps to coordinate patrol areas along convoy routes outside of Dammam, Saudi Arabia November 1990.

The 372nd Military Police Company was originally activated on 15 October 1942 in Florence, Arizona under the authority of the Ninth Service Command. The unit was given orders in mid-July 1943 to report to Camp Shanks, near Orangeburg, New York for shipment to Italy in support of the Naples-Foggia Campaign. The unit also supported the Fifth Army in the Rome-Arno Campaign that began on 22 January 1944 and ended 4 June 1944. The unit has participated in Operation Dragoon in France, Operation Nordwind. The unit was deactivated on 14 November 1945 and then reactivated in Baltimore, Maryland on 26 June 1947. The unit was then relocated to Cumberland, Maryland on South Centre Street. The unit was then deactivated on 15 June 1959. The unit was then redesignated Bravo Company of the 336th Military Police Battalion. In January 1964 members of the unit provided site security and acted as guides to the area for the B-52 which crashed in Garrett County. The Unit was then reactivated on 22 February 1972 once again as the 372nd Military Police Company as part of the First Army. The unit drilled at the VFW Hall in Lonaconing, Maryland. On 30 June 1973 the unit shifted its location to Cresaptown, Maryland, where it shared the reserve center with the 265th Ordnance Company. In the mid-1970s the unit recruited its first female military police officer. In 1985 a platoon size element was selected for duty in Operation Bright Star in Egypt and Jordan. In 1986 the entire company was selected to participate in Gallant Eagle in California. Then unit was then activated again on 25 September 1990 for Operation Desert Storm.

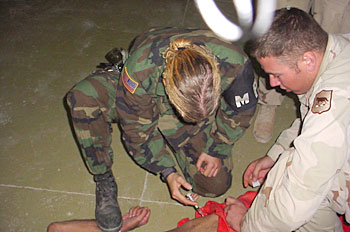
US Military Police officer restraining and sedating prisoner, while a soldier holds him down

During the Iraq War, several detainees at Abu Ghraib prison were tortured, abused, and killed. Charles Graner, Lynndie England, Sabrina Harman and others were later investigated and made to serve time in a military prison.

== Lineage ==
- Constituted 25 September 1942 in the Army of the United States as the 372d Military Police Escort Guard Company
- Activated 15 October 1942 at Florence, Arizona
- Inactivated 14 November 1945 at Camp Myles Standish, Massachusetts
- Allotted 14 June 1947 to the Organized Reserves
- Activated 26 June 1947 at Baltimore, Maryland
- (Organized Reserves redesignated 25 March 1948 as the Organized Reserve Corps)
- (Organized Reserve Corps redesignated 9 July 1952 as the Army Reserve)
- Location Changed 17 March 1949 to Cumberland, Maryland
- Changed 20 August 1951 to Lonaconing, Maryland
- Reorganized and redesignated 15 November 1952 as the 372d Military Police Company
- Inactivated 15 June 1959 at Lonaconing, Maryland
- Activated 22 February 1972 at Lonaconing, Maryland
- Location changed 30 June 1973 Cumberland, Maryland
- Ordered into active military service 27 September 1990 at Cumberland, Maryland
- Released from active military service 24 May 1991 and reverted to reserve status
- Ordered into active military service and deployed to Bosnia in support of Operation Noble Eagle in 2001–2002
- Ordered into active military service 24 February 2003 at Cumberland, Maryland
- Released from active military service 10 October 2004 and reverted to reserve status
- Order into active military service 26 April 2010 at Cumberland, Maryland
- Released from active military service 1 May 2011 and reverted to reserve status
- Ordered into active military service 3 March 2016 at Cumberland, Maryland

== Honors ==
=== Campaign participation credit ===
- World War II – EAME:
1. Naples-Foggia;
2. Rome-Arno;
3. Southern France (with arrowhead);
4. Rhineland;
5. Ardennes-Alsace;
6. Central Europe
- Southwest Asia:
1. Defense of Saudi Arabia;
2. Liberation of Kuwait;
3. Cease-Fire
4. Operation Noble Eagle 2001–2002
5. Operation Enduring Freedom 2001–2003
6. Operation Iraqi Freedom 2003–2004
7. Operation Enduring Freedom 2010–2011
8. Operation Enduring Freedom 2016–2017

== Unit Awards ==
Streamer	Award	Year(s)	Additional Info
	European-African-Middle Eastern Campaign	1942–1945	Naples-Foggia, Rome-Arno, Southern France, Rhineland, Ardennes-Alsace, Central Europe
	World War II Victory	1945	World War II
	National Defense Service Streamer	1942–1945, 1990–1991, 2003–2004, 2010–2011	World War II, Operation Desert Shield and Desert Storm, Operation Iraqi Freedom and Enduring Freedom
	Southwest Asia Service	1990–1991	Operation Desert Shield and Desert Storm, Southwest Asia Cease-Fire
	Iraq Campaign	2003–2004	Operation Iraqi Freedom
Afghanistan_Campaign_Medal	Afghanistan Campaign	2010–2011	Operation Enduring Freedom

=== Decorations ===
- None

== See also ==
- Abu Ghraib torture and prisoner abuse
- Charles Graner
- Ivan Frederick
- Jeremy Sivits
- Joe Darby
- Lynndie England
- Megan Ambuhl
- Sabrina Harman
- Standard Operating Procedure
