= Abu Ghraib prison =

1960s–2014 prison in central Iraq

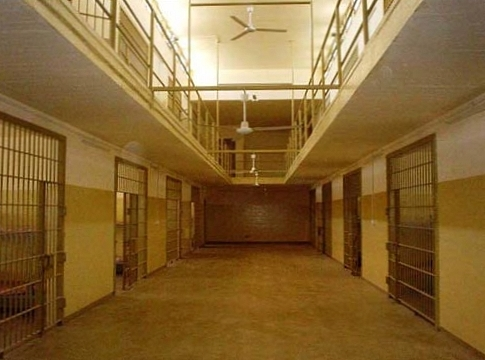
- Abu Ghraib cell block in 2005
- Interactive map of Abu Ghraib prison
- Location: Abu Ghraib, Iraq; 33.2925°N 44.0650°E
- Status: Closed
- Security class: Maximum-security prison
- Opened: 1960s
- Closed: 2014
- Former name: Baghdad Central Prison (after 2006)
- Managed by: Iraqi government (post-2006)

Abu Ghraib prison (Arabic: سجن أبو غريب, romanized: Sijn Abū Ghurayb) was a prison complex in Abu Ghraib, Iraq, located 32 kilometers (20 mi) west of Baghdad. It became internationally known as a place where Saddam Hussein's government tortured and executed dissidents, and later as the site of the Abu Ghraib torture and prisoner abuse scandal where the United States military's torture of Iraqi detainees was revealed in a series of photographs published in worldwide news media.

Abu Ghraib gained international attention in 2003 following the U.S. invasion of Iraq, when the torture and abuse of detainees committed by guards in part of the complex operated by Coalition forces was exposed.

Under Saddam's Ba'ath government, it was known as Abu Ghraib Prison and had a reputation as a place of torture and some of the worst cases of torture in the modern world. It was sometimes referred to in the Western media as "Saddam's Torture Central". The prison was renamed after United States forces expelled the former Iraqi government, which had called it the Baghdad Central Confinement Facility (BCCF) or Baghdad Central Correctional Facility. In May of 2004, Camp Avalanche, a tent camp on the grounds of Abu Ghraib for security detainees, changed its name to Camp Redemption at the request of a governing council member.

In 2006, the United States transferred complete control of Abu Ghraib to the federal government of Iraq, and was reopened in 2009 as Baghdad Central Prison (Arabic: سجن بغداد المركزي, romanized: Sijn Baġdād al-Markizī). However, due to security concerns during the War in Iraq, it closed in 2014. Since all of the 2,400 inmates were transferred to other high-security prisons, the prison complex is currently vacant, and Saddam-era mass graves have been uncovered at the site.

== History ==
The prison was built by Western contractors in the 1960s. The size of a small town, the prison was divided into five different compounds. Under the government of Saddam Hussein the facility was under the control of the Directorate of General Security (Al-Amn al-Amm) and was the site of the torture and execution of thousands of political prisoners—up to 4,000 prisoners are thought to have been executed there in 1984 alone. During the 1990s human rights organization Amnesty International documented repeated events where as many as several hundred inmates were executed in a single episode. These included hundreds executed in November 1996, and several hundred members of the Shi'a denomination killed in 1998 and 2001. Amnesty reported that it could not produce a complete picture of events at the prison due to government secrecy. It was also the reputed location of Saddam Hussein's alleged shredder.

The section for political inmates of Abu Ghraib was divided into "open" and "closed" wings. The closed wing housed only Shi'ites. They were not allowed visitors or any outside contact.

Coalition prisoners were held and tortured in Abu Ghraib during the Gulf War, including the British Special Air Service patrol Bravo Two Zero.

The prison held as many as 15,000 inmates in 2001. In 2002, Saddam Hussein's government began an expansion project to add six new cellblocks to the prison. In October 2002, he gave amnesty to most prisoners in Iraq. After the prisoners were released and the prison was left empty, it was vandalized and looted. Almost all of the documents relating to prisoners were piled and burnt inside of prison offices and cells, leading to extensive structural damage.

Known mass-graves related to Abu Ghraib include:

- Khan Dhari, west of Baghdad - mass grave with the bodies of political prisoners from Abu Ghraib prison in Baghdad. Fifteen victims were executed on 26 December 1998 and buried by prison authorities under the cover of darkness.
- Al-Zahedi, on the western outskirts of Baghdad—secret graves near a civilian cemetery contain the remains of nearly 1,000 political prisoners. According to an eyewitness, 10 to 15 bodies arrived at a time from the Abu Ghraib prison and were buried by local civilians. An execution on 10 December 1999 in Abu Ghraib claimed the lives of 101 people in one day. On 9 March 2000, 58 prisoners were killed at a time. The last corpse interred was number 993.

=== 2003–2006 ===
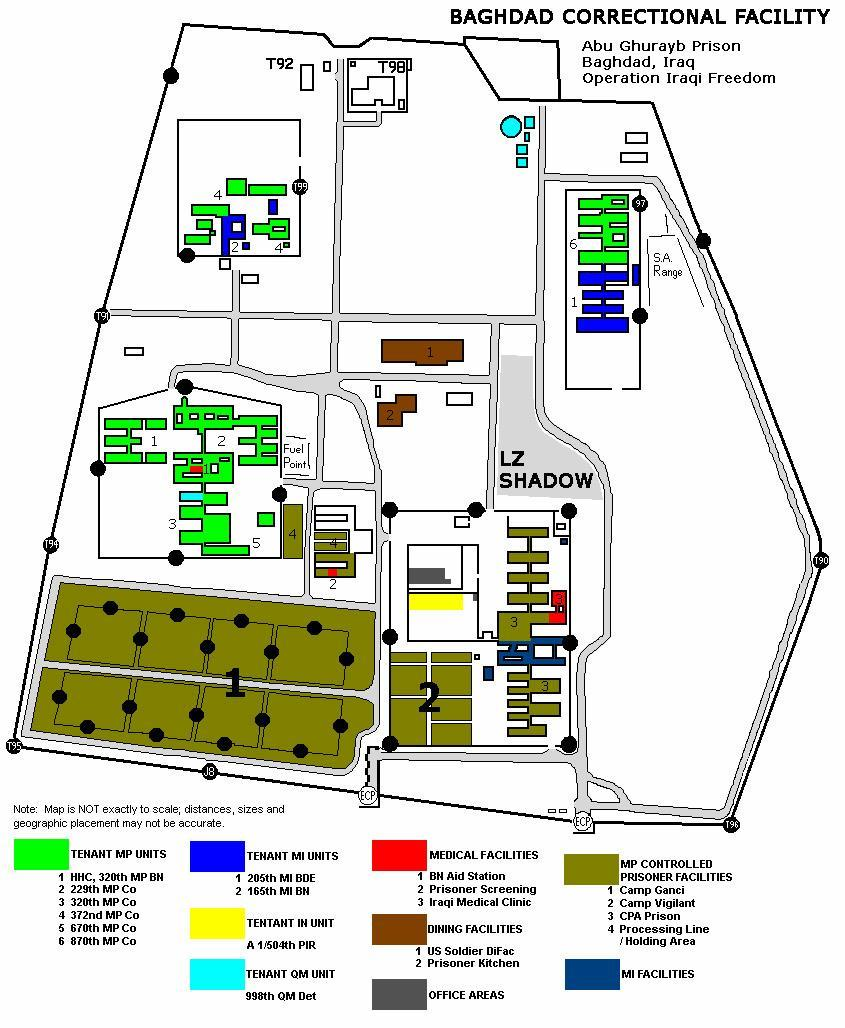
Map of the prison

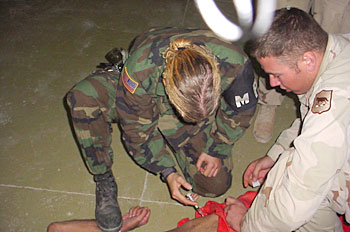
US Military Police officer Megan Ambuhl restraining and sedating a prisoner, while a soldier holds him down

From 2003 until August 2006, Abu Ghraib prison was used for detention purposes by both the U.S.-led coalition forces and the Iraqi government. The Iraqi government has controlled the area of the facility known as "The Hard Site". The prison was used to house only convicted criminals. Suspected criminals, insurgents or those arrested and awaiting trial were held at other facilities, commonly known as "camps" in U.S. military parlance. The U.S. housed all its detainees at "Camp Redemption", which is divided into five security levels. This camp built in the summer of 2004 replaced the three-level setup of Camp Ganci, Camp Vigilant and Abu Ghraib's Tier 1. The remainder of the facility was occupied by the U.S. military.

Abu Ghraib served as both a FOB (Forward Operating Base) and a detention facility. When the U.S. military was using the Abu Ghraib prison as a detention facility, it housed approximately 7,490 prisoners there in March 2004. Later population of detainees was much smaller, because Camp Redemption had a much smaller capacity than Camp Ganci had, and many detainees have been sent from Abu Ghraib to Camp Bucca for this reason. The U.S. military initially held all "persons of interest" in Camp Redemption. Some were suspected rebels, and some suspected criminals. Those convicted by trial in Iraqi court are transferred to the Iraqi-run Hard Site.

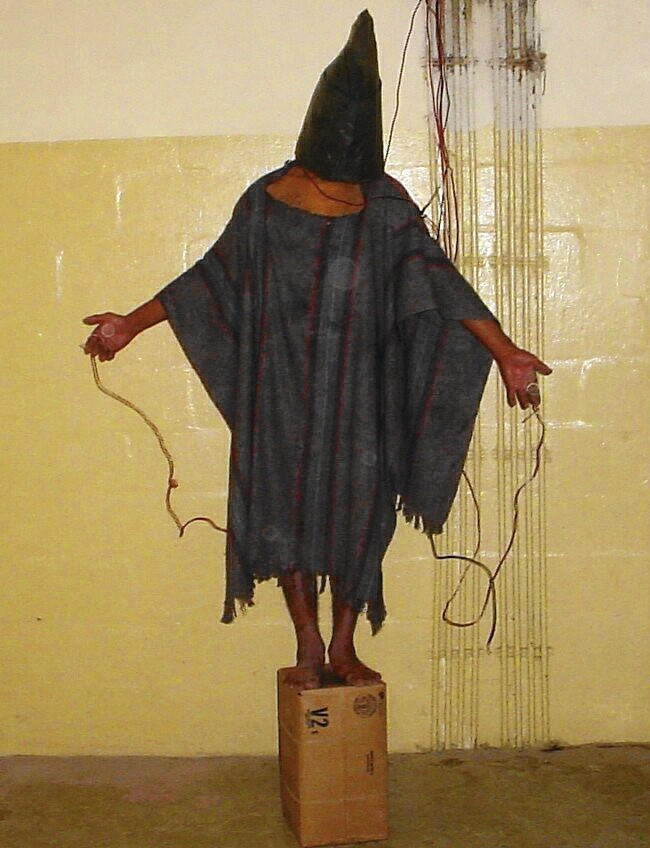
Picture of Abdou Hussain Saad Faleh, one of the prisoners subjected to torture and abuse by U.S. guards at Abu Ghraib

In the Abu Ghraib torture and prisoner abuse scandal, reserve soldiers from the 372nd Military Police Company were charged under the Uniform Code of Military Justice with prisoner abuse, beginning with an Army Criminal Investigation Division investigation on January 14, 2004. In April 2004, U.S. television news-magazine 60 Minutes reported on a story from the magazine The New Yorker, which recounted torture and humiliation of Iraqi detainees by U.S. soldiers and contracted civilians. The story included photographs depicting the abuse of prisoners. The events created a substantial political scandal within the U.S. and other coalition countries.

On April 20, 2004, insurgents fired 40 mortar rounds into the prison, killing 24 detainees and injuring 92. Commentators thought the attack was either an attempt to incite a riot or retribution for detainees' cooperating with the United States. In May 2004, the U.S.-led coalition embarked on a prisoner-release policy to reduce numbers to fewer than 2,000. The U.S. military released nearly 1,000 detainees at the prison during the week ending August 27, 2005, at the request of the Iraqi government. In a May 24, 2004 address at the U.S. Army War College, President George W. Bush announced that the prison would be demolished. On June 14 Iraqi interim President Ghazi Mashal Ajil al-Yawer said he opposed this decision; on June 21 U.S. military judge Col. James Pohl ruled the prison was a crime scene and could not be demolished until investigations and trials were completed. In July 2004 Brigadier General Janis Karpinski reported that some of the interrogators who spoke Arabic were Israeli. The Israeli Foreign Ministry in a statement denied the allegations.

On April 2, 2005, the prison was attacked by more than 60 insurgents in the engagement known as the Battle of Abu Ghraib. In the two hours before being forced to retreat, the attackers suffered at least 50 casualties according to the U.S. military. Thirty-six persons at or in the prison, including U.S. military personnel, civilians and detainees, were injured in the attack. The attackers used small arms, rockets, and RPGs as weapons, and threw grenades over the walls. A suicide VBIED detonated just outside the front wall after Marines fired on it. Officials believe that the car bomb was intended to breach the prison wall, enabling an assault and/or mass escape for detainees. Insurgents also attacked military forces nearby on highways en route to the prison for reinforcement and used ambushes along the roads. Al Qaeda in Iraq claimed responsibility.

=== 2006–2014 ===
In March 2006, the U.S. military decided to transfer the 4,500 inmates to other prisons and transfer control of the Abu Ghraib prison to Iraqi authorities. The prison was reported emptied of prisoners in August 2006. The formal transfer was made on September 2, 2006. The formal transfer was conducted between Major General Jack Gardner, Commander of Task Force 134, and representatives of the Iraqi Ministry of Justice and the Iraqi Army.

In February 2009, Iraq reopened Abu Ghraib under the new name of Baghdad Central Prison. It was designed to house 3,500 inmates. The government said it planned to increase the number up to 15,000 prisoners by the end of the year.

A major prison break occurred on July 21, 2013 when at least 500 prisoners escaped following an armed assault on the prison just before sunset. A senior member of the security and defense committee in parliament described the prisoners as mostly those who were "convicted senior members of al-Qaeda and had received death sentences." A simultaneous attack occurred at another prison, in Taji, around 12 miles north of Baghdad, where 16 members of the Iraqi security forces and six militants were killed. The Islamic State of Iraq and the Levant (ISIL) issued a statement on a jihadist forum claiming that they were responsible for organising and executing the prison break, which had taken months of preparation, and claimed that the attacks involved a barrage of mortars and rockets, 12 car bombs and suicide bombers which were used to destroy the outer walls of the prison. They also claimed that they killed more than 120 government troops, though the Iraqi authorities claimed that 25 members of the security forces were killed, along with 21 prisoners and at least 10 militants.

=== Closure ===
On April 15, 2014, the Iraqi Justice Ministry announced that it had closed the prison permanently amid fears that it could be taken over by ISIL, which had already seized much of Anbar Province at the time. All 2,400 inmates were moved to other high-security facilities in the country.

== Notable detainees ==
- Farzad Bazoft
- Yunis Khatayer Abbas
- Emad al-Janabi
- Manadel al-Jamadi
- Abu Abdulrahman al-Bilawi
- Bill Barloon
- Thahe Mohammed Sabbar
- John Nichol, a Royal Air Force navigator shot down and captured by Iraqi forces during Operation Desert Storm
- Abu Bakr al-Baghdadi, born Ibrahim Awad Ibrahim al-Badry, who would later become the leader of the IS from May 2010 until his death on October 26, 2019.
- Ahmed al-Sharaa, current president of Syria, sent to Camp Bucca shortly after detention and eventually released after 5 years
- Ali Shallal al-Qaisi

== Notable U.S. military guards ==
- Lynndie England
- Sabrina Harman
- Charles Graner
- Megan Ambuhl
- Ivan Frederick
- Jeremy Sivits
- Roman Krol
- Armin Cruz
- Javal Davis

== See also ==
- Human rights in Saddam Hussein's Iraq
- Human rights in post-Saddam Iraq
- Abu Ghraib torture and prisoner abuse
- U.S. prison operations in Iraq
