= Lynndie England =

American war criminal (born 1982)

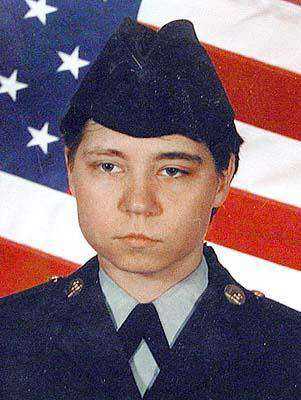
- Official portrait, c. 2000
- Born: Lynndie Rana England; November 8, 1982 (age 44); Ashland, Kentucky, U.S.
- Education: Frankfort High School
- Years active: 1999–2008
- Children: 1 (with Charles Graner)
- Convictions: Maltreating detainees Conspiracy to maltreat detainees Committing an indecent act
- Penalty: Three years imprisonment, dishonorable discharge
- Military career
- Allegiance: United States
- Branch: Army
- Service years: 1999–2008
- Rank: Private First Class
- Unit: 372nd Military Police Company
- Conflicts: Global War on Terrorism; Iraq War

Lynndie Rana England (born November 8, 1982) is an American war criminal and former United States Army Reserve soldier who was prosecuted for abusing detainees during the Abu Ghraib torture and prisoner abuse that occurred at Abu Ghraib prison in Baghdad during the Iraq War. She was one of 11 military personnel from the 372nd Military Police Company who were convicted in 2005 for war crimes. After being sentenced to three years in prison and a dishonorable discharge, England was incarcerated from September 27, 2005, to March 1, 2007, when she was released on parole. She apologized for sparking deadly retaliatory attacks against U.S. soldiers, but refused to apologize for the abuse of her victims.

== Early life ==
Born in Ashland, Kentucky, England moved with her family to Fort Ashby, West Virginia, when she was two years old. She was raised by her mother, Terrie Bowling England, and her father Kenneth R. England Jr., a railroad worker who worked at a station in Cumberland, Maryland. She aspired to be a storm chaser. As a young child, England was diagnosed with selective mutism, a form of anxiety disorder.

England joined the United States Army Reserve in Cumberland in 1999 while she was a junior at Frankfort High School near Short Gap. England worked as a cashier in an IGA store during her junior year of high school and married a co-worker in 2002, but they later divorced. England also wished to earn money for college, so that she could become a storm chaser. She was also a member of the Future Farmers of America. After graduating from Frankfort High School in 2001, she worked a night job in a chicken-processing factory in Moorefield. She was deployed to Iraq in June 2003.

England was engaged to fellow convicted war criminal and Abu Ghraib prison guard Charles Graner. In 2004, she gave birth to a son fathered by him at Womack Army Medical Center at Fort Bragg.

== Involvement in prisoner abuse ==
England mobilized with her Army Reserve unit and was stationed in Baghdad at Abu Ghraib prison in March 2003 to perform guard duties. Along with other soldiers, she was investigated in late 2003 for mistreatment of Iraqi prisoners of war involving the infliction of sexual, physical and psychological abuse after photographs came to light showing prisoners being abused.

While formal charges were being prepared for general court-martial, England was transferred to the U.S. military installation at Fort Bragg, North Carolina, on March 18, 2004, because of her pregnancy. Her court-martial was scheduled for September 2005 on charges of conspiracy to maltreat prisoners and assault consummated by battery.

On April 30, 2005, England agreed to plead guilty to four counts of maltreating prisoners, two counts of conspiracy, and one count of dereliction of duty. In exchange, prosecutors would have dropped two other charges, committing indecent acts and failure to obey a lawful order. This plea deal would have reduced her maximum sentence from 16 years to 11 years had it been accepted by the military judge. In May 2005, however, Military Judge Colonel James Pohl declared a mistrial on the grounds that he could not accept England's plea of guilty to a charge of conspiring with Graner to maltreat detainees because Graner had testified that he believed that, in placing a tether around a naked detainee's neck and asking England to pose for a photograph with him, he was documenting a legitimate use of force. Graner was convicted on all charges and sentenced to 10 years in prison. At her retrial, England was convicted on September 26, 2005, of one count of conspiracy, four counts of maltreating detainees and one count of committing an indecent act. She was acquitted on a second conspiracy count. The next day, England was sentenced to a three-year prison term and a dishonorable discharge.

Members of the United States Senate have reportedly reviewed additional photographs supplied by the Department of Defense that have not been publicly released. There has been considerable speculation as to the contents of these photos. In a March 2008 interview, England stated in response to a question about these unreleased pictures, "You see the dogs biting the prisoners. Or you see bite marks from the dogs. You can see MPs holding down a prisoner so a medic can give him a shot."

England was incarcerated at Naval Consolidated Brig, Miramar. She was paroled on March 1, 2007, after serving 521 days, or just over 17 months. She remained on parole through September 2008 until her three-year sentence was complete, whereupon she was discharged.

In a May 11, 2004, interview with the Denver CBS owned-and-operated television station KCNC-TV, England reportedly said that she had been "instructed by persons in higher ranks" to commit acts of abuse as a form of psychological operation, and that she should keep doing it, because it worked as intended. England noted that she felt "weird" when a commanding officer asked her to do such things as "stand there, give the thumbs up, and smile." However, England felt that she was doing "nothing out of the ordinary."

== Later life ==
After serving her sentence, England returned to Fort Ashby, West Virginia, and stayed with friends and family.

On July 9, 2007, England was appointed to the Keyser, West Virginia, volunteer recreation board. In July 2009, England released Tortured: Lynndie England, Abu Ghraib and the Photographs that Shocked the World, a biography that was set with a book tour that she hoped would rehabilitate her public image. As of 2009, England was on antidepressant medication and also had post-traumatic stress disorder and anxiety. As of 2013, she had found seasonal employment as a secretary.

In March 2008, England told the German magazine Stern that the media was to blame for the consequences of the Abu Ghraib scandal. In a January 16, 2009 interview with The Guardian, England noted being pressured by Charles Graner to pose for the prison photos.

In 2012, following her release, she stated that she did not regret her actions.

== Gallery ==
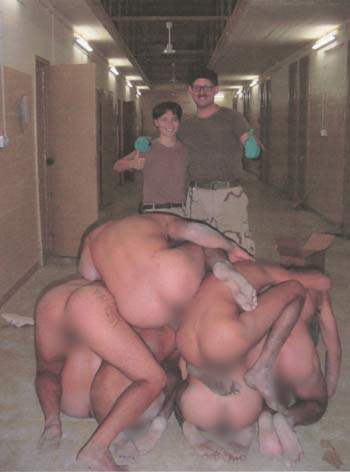
Detainees were placed into a human pyramid. England and Graner posed for the picture.

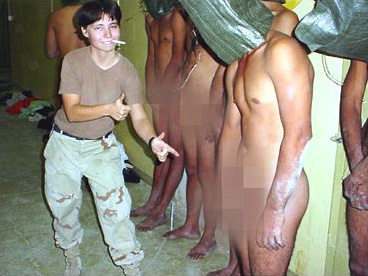
England poses in front of a detainee being forced to masturbate.

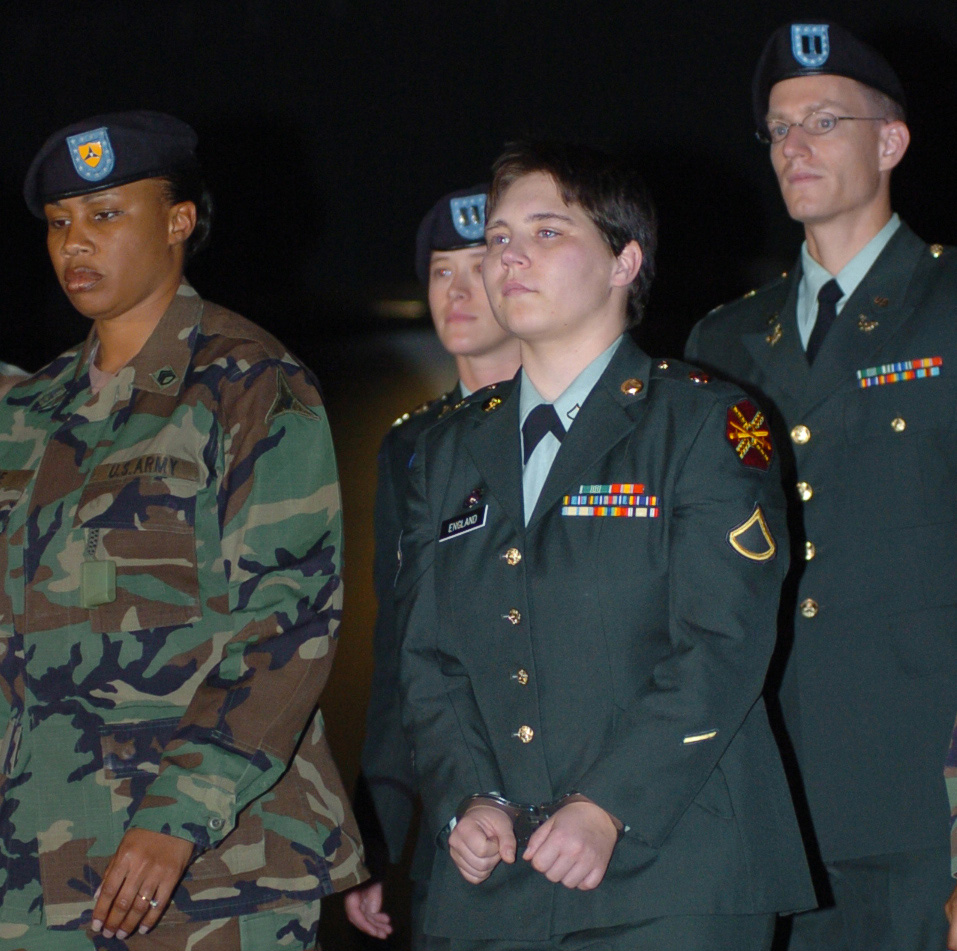
England after she was sentenced to three years for prisoner abuse at Abu Ghraib

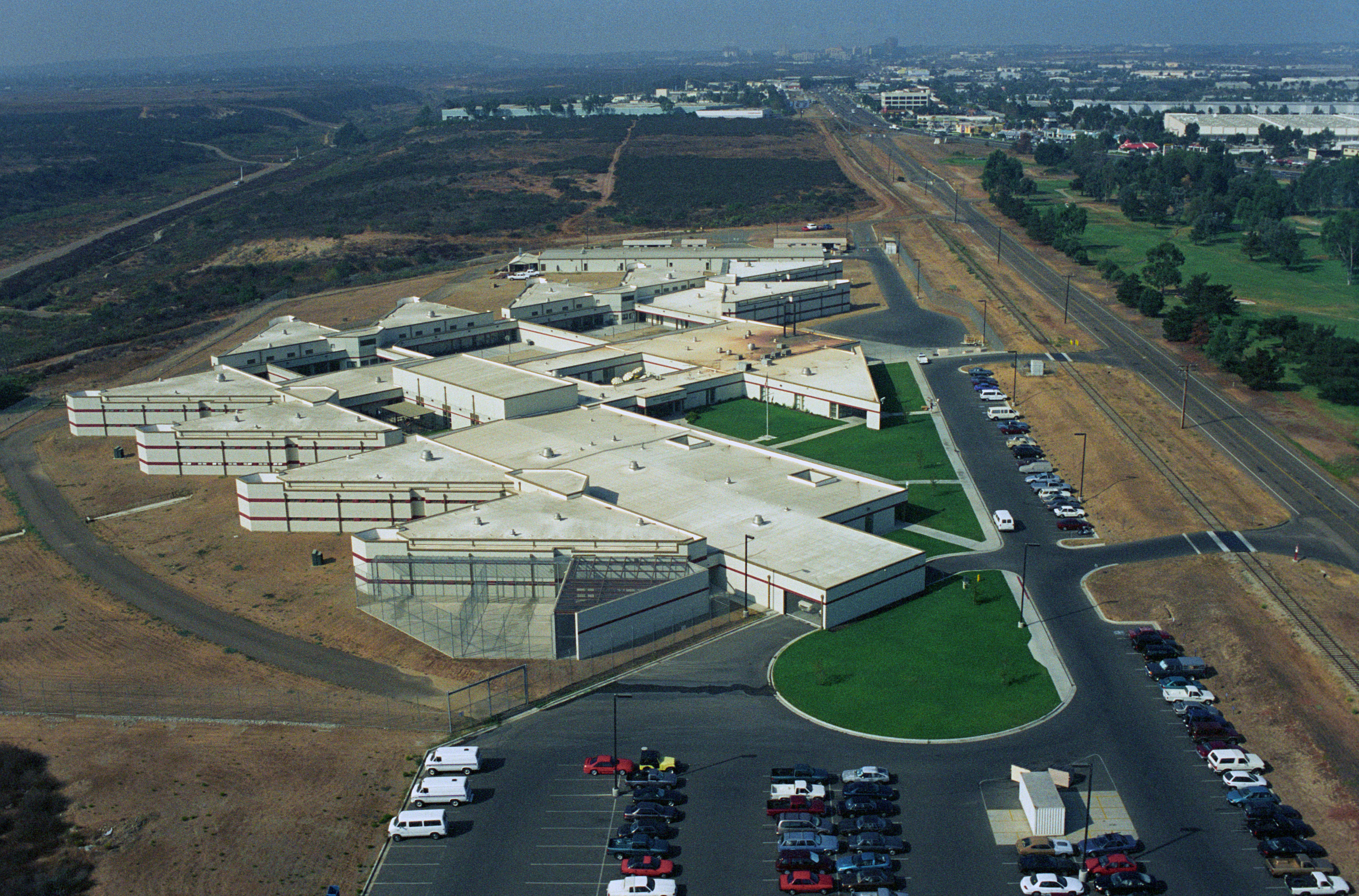
Naval Consolidated Brig, Miramar, where England was imprisoned

== See also ==
- Standard Operating Procedure, 2008 American documentary film
