= Dereliction of duty in American law =

Offense under the United States Code

Dereliction of duty is a specific offense under United States Code Title 10, Section 892, Article 92 and applies to all branches of the US military. A service member who is derelict has willfully refused to perform their duties (or follow a given order) or has incapacitated themselves in such a way that they cannot perform their duties. Such incapacitation includes the offender falling asleep while on duty requiring wakefulness, them getting drunk or otherwise intoxicated and consequently being unable to perform their duties, shooting themselves and thus being unable to perform any duty, or his vacating their post contrary to regulations.

== Details ==
In the U.S. Uniform Code of Military Justice (UCMJ), dereliction of duty is addressed within the regulations governing the failure to obey an order or regulation.

§ 892. Art. 92. Failure to obey order or regulation

Any person subject to this chapter who— ... (3) is derelict in the performance of his duties;

shall be punished as a court-martial may direct.

Punishment can include sanctions up to and including the death penalty (in times of war). Outside of wartime, the maximum punishment allowed is a dishonorable discharge, forfeiture of all pay and allowances, and confinement for 1 year (10 years for service members receiving special pay under 37 USC 310).

== Proving dereliction ==
In order to prosecute a service member under Article 92, the government must prove beyond a reasonable doubt that the service member knew (or should have reasonably known) their duties and that they were either, through neglect or culpable inefficiency (i.e., being inefficient without just cause), derelict in the performance of those duties.

A duty is imposed in any one of the following ways:

- via a treaty,
- statute,
- regulation,
- lawful order,
- standard operating procedure, or
- custom of the service

That the service member possessed actual knowledge of his duties may be proved via:

- regulations,
- training / operating manuals,
- academic literature,
- testimony of service members who held similar positions,
- customs of the service

== Sentinel / lookout ==
UCMJ Article 113 ("Misbehavior of sentinel") includes components of behavior that are, in themselves, examples of dereliction of duty:

1. Drunk while on post
2. Sleeping while on post
3. Leaving one's post without being properly relieved

== Examples: non-judicial punishment ==
=== Failure to follow instructions and directives ===
Both a Staff Sergeant and an Airman First Class stationed at Seymour Johnson Air Force Base had their pay reduced by $300 and $200 pay per month, respectively, for two months, when their actions resulted in a delayed launch and subsequent aircraft shutdown. They were found guilty of failing to follow Air Force Instruction 21-101, Air Force Policy Directive 31-3, and Technical Order 00-20-1. They were also given 14 days extra duty and had a reprimand inserted into their files.

=== Misuse of government property ===
An Airman First Class stationed at Seymour Johnson Air Force Base was reduced to Airman when she received non-judicial punishment for dereliction of duty. She was found to have charged over $700 on her Travel Card for personal uses.

== Example: court-martial ==
=== United States v. Allen Lawson 33 M.J. 946 ===
In August 1988, Marine Lance Corporal Jason Rother died on a desert exercise at Twentynine Palms, California. First Lieutenant Allen Lawson was charged and convicted of dereliction of duty for disobeying orders (to submit a roster of posted Marines and locations to his superior officer, Captain Edwards) and for failing to post two subordinates as a pair (as ordered by the battalion commander, Lieutenant Colonel Robeson).
