= Armenians in Ukraine =

Ethnic group in Ukraine

Հայերն Ուկրաինայում Вірмени в Україні

Total population
- 99,894 (2001)

Regions with significant populations
- Donetsk Oblast, Kharkiv Oblast, Dnipropetrovsk Oblast, Crimea, Odesa Oblast, Luhansk Oblast, Zaporizhzhia Oblast, Kyiv

Languages
- Armenian (Eastern) (50.4%), Ukrainian, Russian (43.2%), Armeno-Kipchak (historical)

Religion
- Armenian Apostolic Church (predominant), Armenian Catholic Church (small community)

Related ethnic groups
- Armenian diaspora
- All figures from

Armenians in Ukraine (Armenian: Հայերն Ուկրաինայում, romanized: Hayern Ukrainayum; Ukrainian: Вірмени в Україні, romanized: Virmeny v Ukraini) are ethnic Armenians who live in Ukraine. They number 99,894 according to the 2001 Ukrainian census. However, the country is also host to a number of Armenian guest workers which has yet to be ascertained. The Armenian population in Ukraine has nearly doubled since the dissolution of the Soviet Union in 1989, largely due to instability in the Caucasus. Ukraine was home to the fifth largest Armenian community in the world before the invasion by Russia displaced millions of people.

== Early history ==
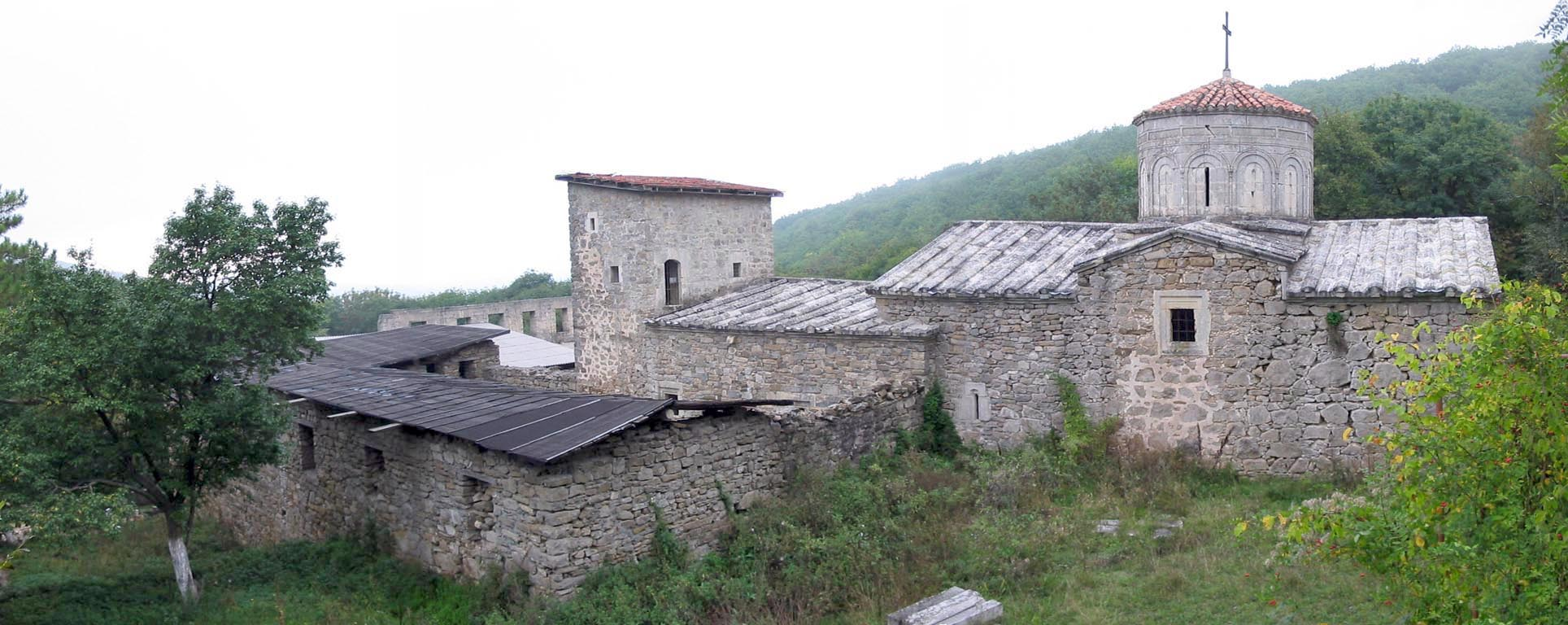
Ruins of the Surb Khach Armenian Monastery, Ukraine

Armenians first appeared in Ukraine during the times of Kyivan Rus'. During the 10th century individual Armenian merchants, mercenaries and craftsmen served at the courts of various Ruthenian rulers. A larger wave of Armenians settled in southeastern Ukraine after the fall of the Armenian capital of Ani to Seljuks in the 11th century. They arrived mainly at the Crimean peninsula and established colonies in Kaffa (Feodosiya), Sudak and Solcati (Staryi Krym). Their numbers were further strengthened throughout the 12th–15th century by Armenians fleeing from a Mongol invasion. This gave the peninsula the name Armenia Maritima in medieval chronicles. Smaller Armenian communities were established in central Ukraine, including Kyiv, and the western regions of Podolia and Halychyna, concentrating around Lviv which in 1267 became the center of an Armenian eparchy.

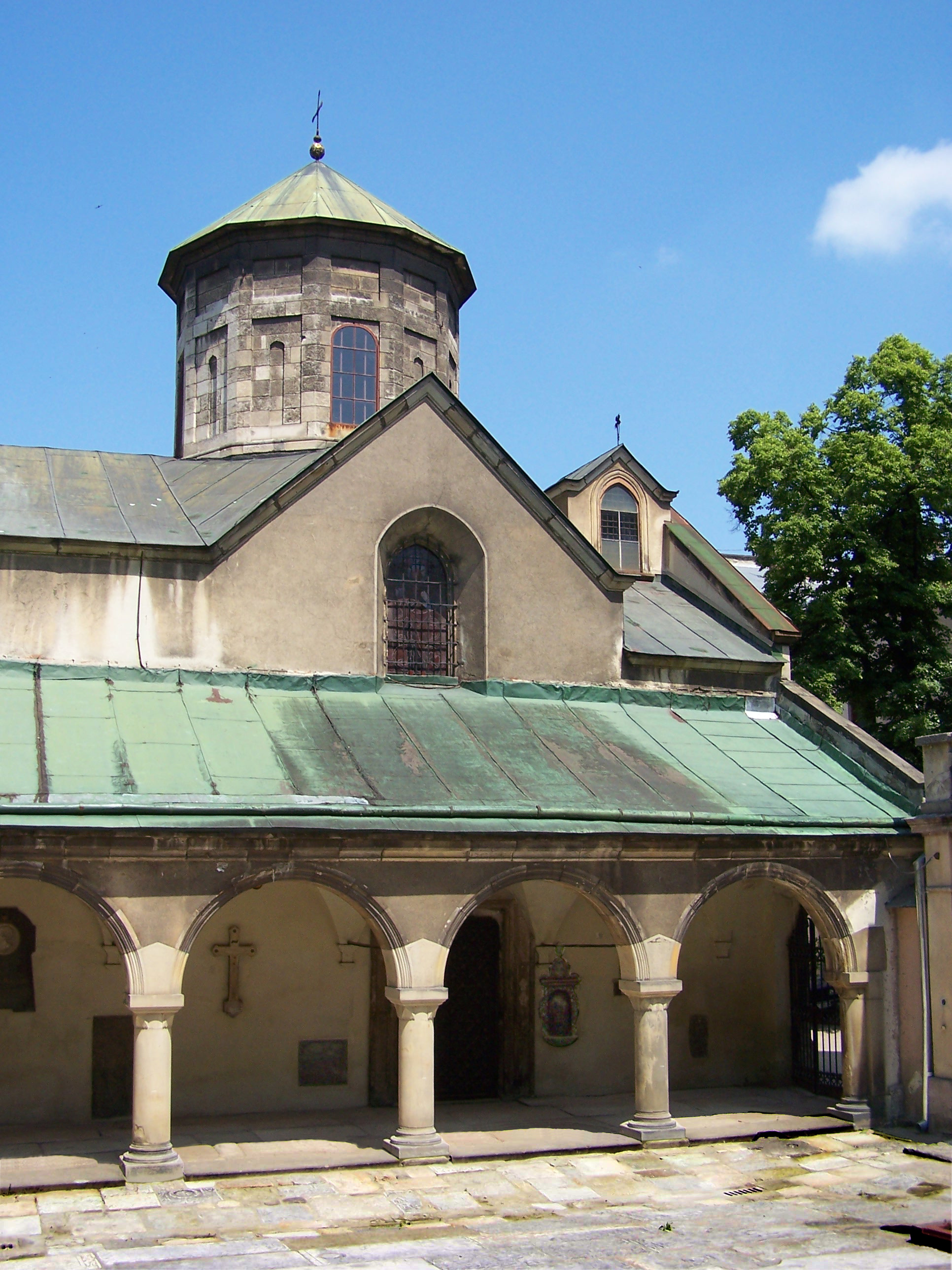
Armenian Cathedral in Lviv.

At the end of the thirteenth century, when members of the Armenian diaspora moved from the Crimean peninsula to the Polish-Ukrainian borderland, they brought Armeno-Kipchak, a Turkic language with them. Armeno-Kipchak of the Kipchak people was still current in the 16th and 17th centuries among the Armenian communities settling in the Lviv and Kamianets-Podilskyi area of what is now Ukraine.

After Crimea fell to the Ottoman Turks in 1475 many Crimean Armenians moved further to the north-west to the already flourishing Armenian communities which gradually integrated into the local Polish and Ukrainian communities while maintaining their distinct identity through the Armenian Catholic Church. In the 18th century Crimea fell under influence of the Russian Empire, which encouraged Crimean Armenians to settle in Russia and a large group of them came to the town of Rostov on Don in 1778, twenty years later Russia having conquered the peninsula called to colonize it and many Armenians arrived from Turkey, establishing new Armenian colonies. During World War II in 1944 Armenians were deported en masse along with Greeks, Bulgarians and Tatars as a "antisoviet element" and allowed to return only in the 1960s. During Soviet rule Armenians came together with people from other Soviet ruled nations to Ukraine to work in the heavy industry located in the eastern parts of the country.

== Armenian community in modern Ukraine ==
Today, the Donetsk Oblast holds the greatest number of Armenians in Ukraine (~16 000, 0.33% of the population). Armenian communities can also be found in Dnipro, Kharkiv, Kherson, Kyiv, Luhansk, Mykolaiv, Zaporizhzhia, and Odesa where the late Ukrainian-Armenian artist Sarkis Ordyan spent most of his life. The city of Lviv is a "spiritual capital" of Armenians in Ukraine serving as an eparchial see for both Catholic and Apostolic churches, under which Ukraine as a single eparchy is split between both of them. Alas, the Armenian Catholic Archeparchy of Lviv is not occupied ever since the end of World War II and the Armenian Apostolic Church is predominant.

The Armenians continue to have a historic presence in Crimea, which remains under Russian control since the 2014 Russian military intervention in Ukraine. The 9,000 Armenians make up 0.43% of the population in the area and are numerous in major urban centers such as Sevastopol where they comprise 0.3% of the city's population. Hovhannes "Ivan" Aivazovsky, the world-renowned Armenian painter lived and worked his entire life in the Crimean city of Feodosiya.

Many Armenians living in Ukraine have been Russified with about half speaking Armenian as their mother tongue but over 43% speaking Russian and only 6% Ukrainian.

=== Distribution ===
Armenians in Ukraine by oblasts according to 2001 Ukrainian Census.

Oblast	Armenians
Donetsk Oblast	15,700
Kharkiv Oblast	11,100
Dnipropetrovsk Oblast	10,600
Autonomous Republic of Crimea	8,700
Odesa Oblast	7,400
Luhansk Oblast	6,600
Zaporizhzhia Oblast	6,400
City of Kyiv	4,900
Kherson Oblast	4,500
Mykolaiv Oblast	4,300
Poltava Oblast	2,600
Kyiv Oblast	2,300
Cherkasy Oblast	1,700
City of Sevastopol	1,300
Sumy Oblast	1,200
Vinnytsia Oblast	1,100
Zhytomyr Oblast	800
Ivano-Frankivsk Oblast	300
Rivne Oblast	300

Armenians in Ukraine by cities, according to the 2001 census:

City	Armenians
Kharkiv	7,214
Kyiv	4,935
Dnipro	4,710
Odesa	4,374
Donetsk	4,050
Zaporizhzhia	3,097
Luhansk	2,137
Simferopol	2,130
Mykolaiv	2,112
Kryvyi Rih	1,589
Kramatorsk	1,386
Sevastopol	1,319
Kherson	1,239
Mariupol	1,205
Makiivka	1,021

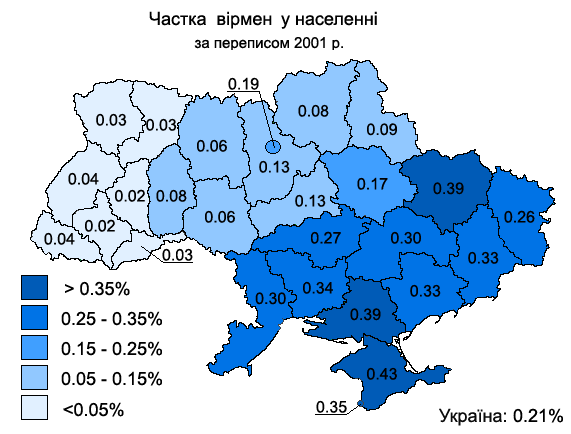
Armenians in Ukraine according to 2001 Census

== Notable representatives ==
- Józef Bartłomiej Zimorowic, Polish poet and historian of the Baroque era, burgomaster of Lviv
- Mikołaj Torosowicz, the first Armenian Catholic bishop of Lviv
- Grzegorz Piramowicz, Roman Catholic priest
- Karol Antoniewicz, Polish-Armenian Jesuit and missionary
- Sadok Barącz, Galician religious leader, historian, folklorist, archivist
- Roman Barącz (1856–1930) surgeon, otorhinolaryngologist, professor at the Faculty of Medicine of Lviv University, and collector
- Tadeusz Barącz (1849–1905), Polish sculptor
- Julian Oktawian Zachariewicz-Lwigród, Lviv architect
- Ignacy Łukasiewicz, Galician pharmacist, engineer, businessman, inventor, and philanthropist
- Dawid Abrahamowicz, Polish politician and social activist
- Adolf Abrahamowicz, Polish writer
- Kajetan Abgarowicz, Polish journalist and writer
- Ivan Aivazovsky (Crimean Armenian), painter
- Józef Teodorowicz, the last Armenian Catholic Archbishop of Lviv
- Tamara Tchinarova (partly Armenian), ballerina
- Sergei Parajanov, filmmaker
- Vagrich Bakhchanyan, graphic artist and designer
- Roman Balayan, film director
- Roza Sarkisian, theatre director
- Arsen Savadov, painter
- Vadym Novynskyi, oligarch
- Arsen Avakov (Armenian father, Ossetian mother), Ukrainian Minister of Interior (longest serving minister)
- David Manukyan, Greco Roman wrestler
- Oksana Markarova (partly Armenian), politician and the current Ambassador of Ukraine to the United States, former Minister of Finance
- Armen Akopyan, football player
- Jamala (Crimean Tatar father, Armenian mother), Ukrainian singer (winner of the Eurovision Song Contest)
- Artem Dalakian, boxer
- Gevorg Manukian, boxer
- Karen Balayan, judoka
- Erik Arushanian, wrestler
- Hor Ohannesian, wrestler
- Oleksandr Stepanyan, wrestler
- Artur Ayvazyan, sport shooter
- Armen Vardanyan, Greco-Roman wrestler
- Katerina Rohonyan, Ukrainian-American chess player (Woman Grandmaster)
- Serhiy Nigoyan, Euromaidan activist, first protester killed by shooting during the protest
- Valeriy Voskonyan, football player
- Artur Avahimyan, football player
- Evgeniya Doluhanova, chess player
- Olena Akopyan, skier
- Snizhana Babkina (Vartanian), actress
- Anahit Barseghyan, swimmer
- Ani Palian, paralimpic swimmer
- Renata Oganesian, ice skater
- Sarkis Ordyan, painter
- Meri Akopyan, philologist, Director of the Department of International Cooperation and European Integration of the Ministry of Internal Affairs of Ukraine (2015-2021)
- Valery Geghamyan - artist
- Suto Mamoian - People's Deputy of Ukraine in the 9th Ukrainian Verkhovna Rada
- Sergei Grigoryants - Soviet dissident
- Henrikh Altunian - Soviet dissident and member of the Verkhovna Rada

== Cultural heritage ==
Armenian cultural heritage in Ukraine:

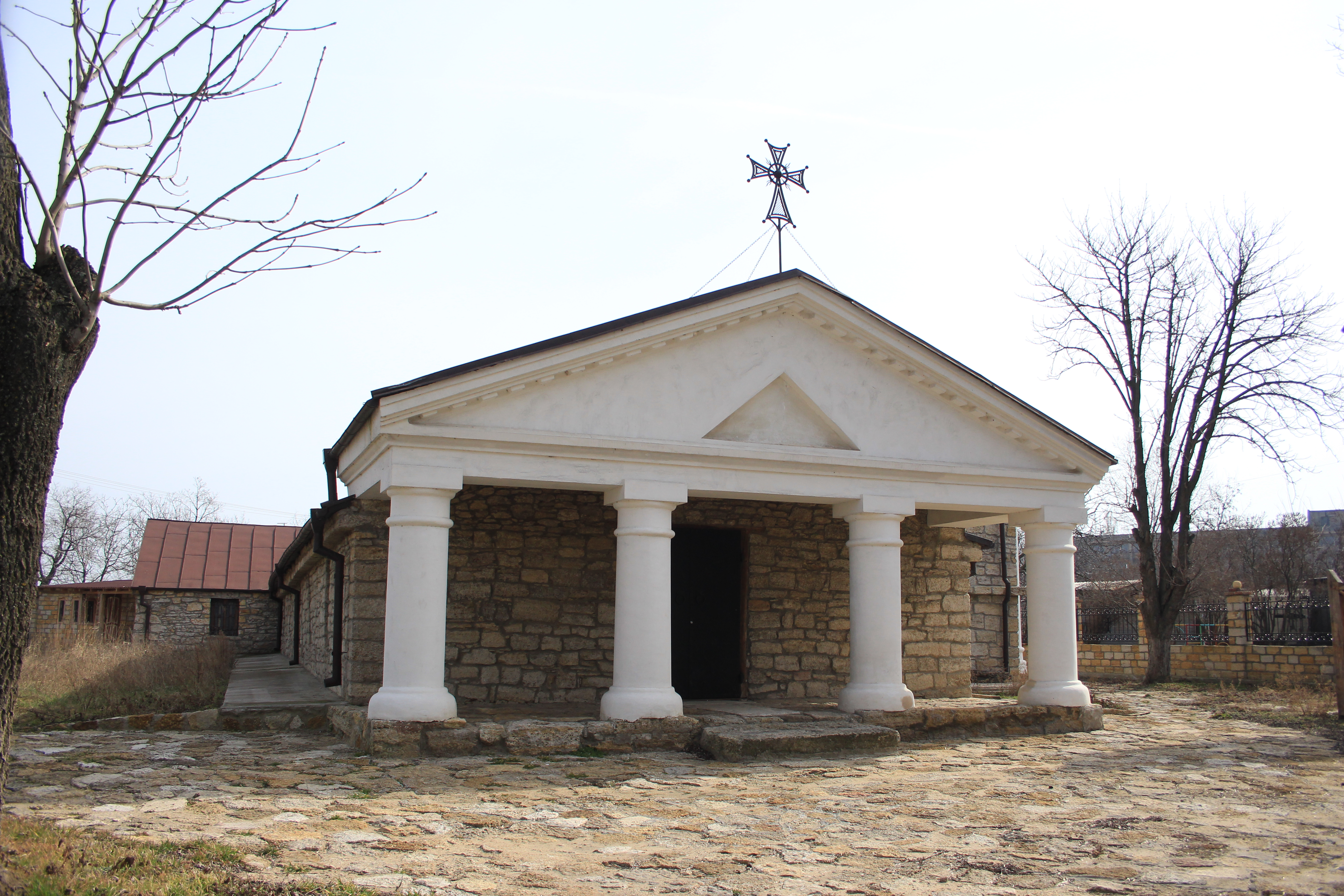
Armenian Dormition Church in Bilhorod-Dnistrovskyi (14th century)

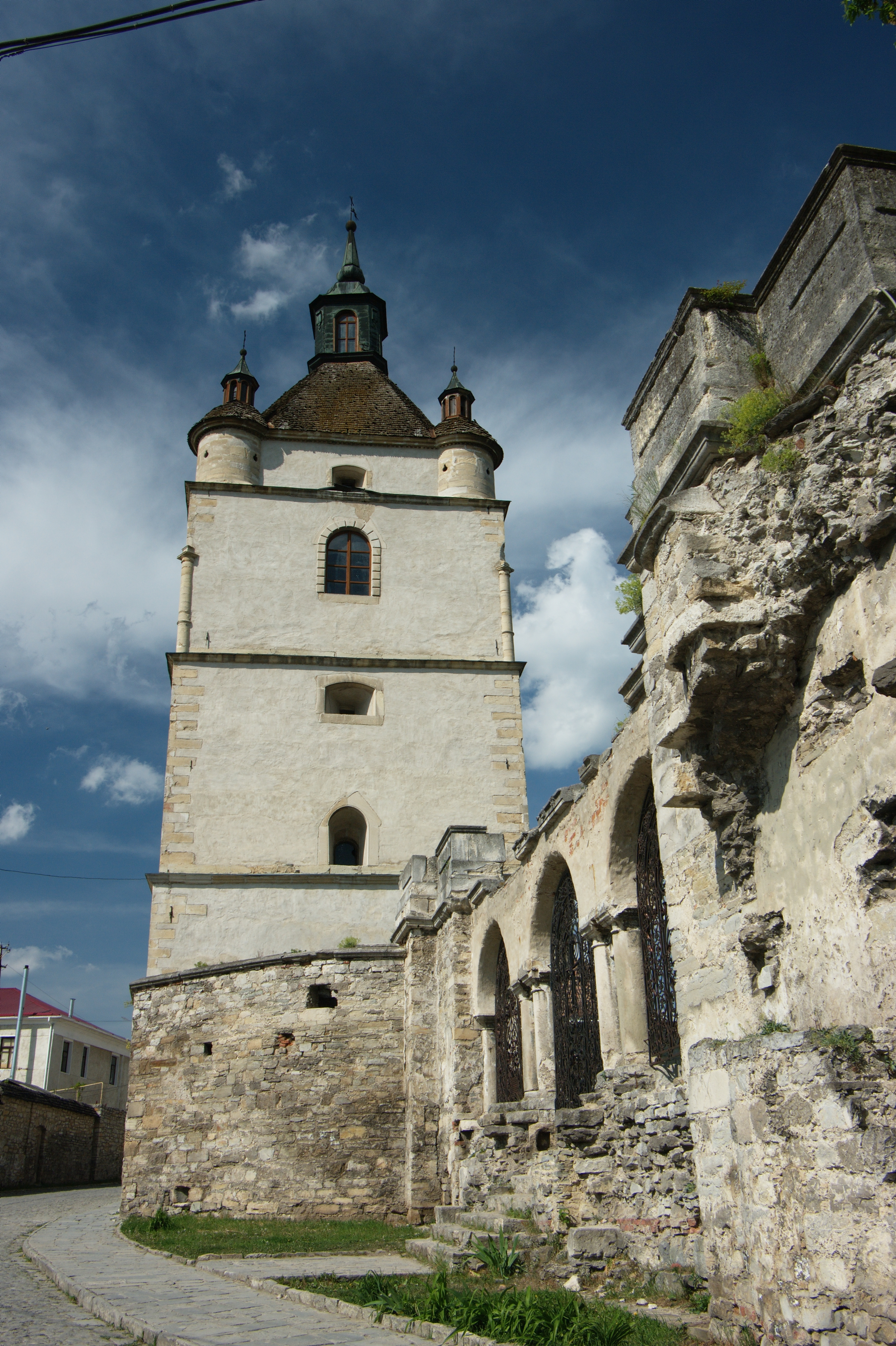
Armenian Belltower in Kamianets-Podilskyi (16th century)

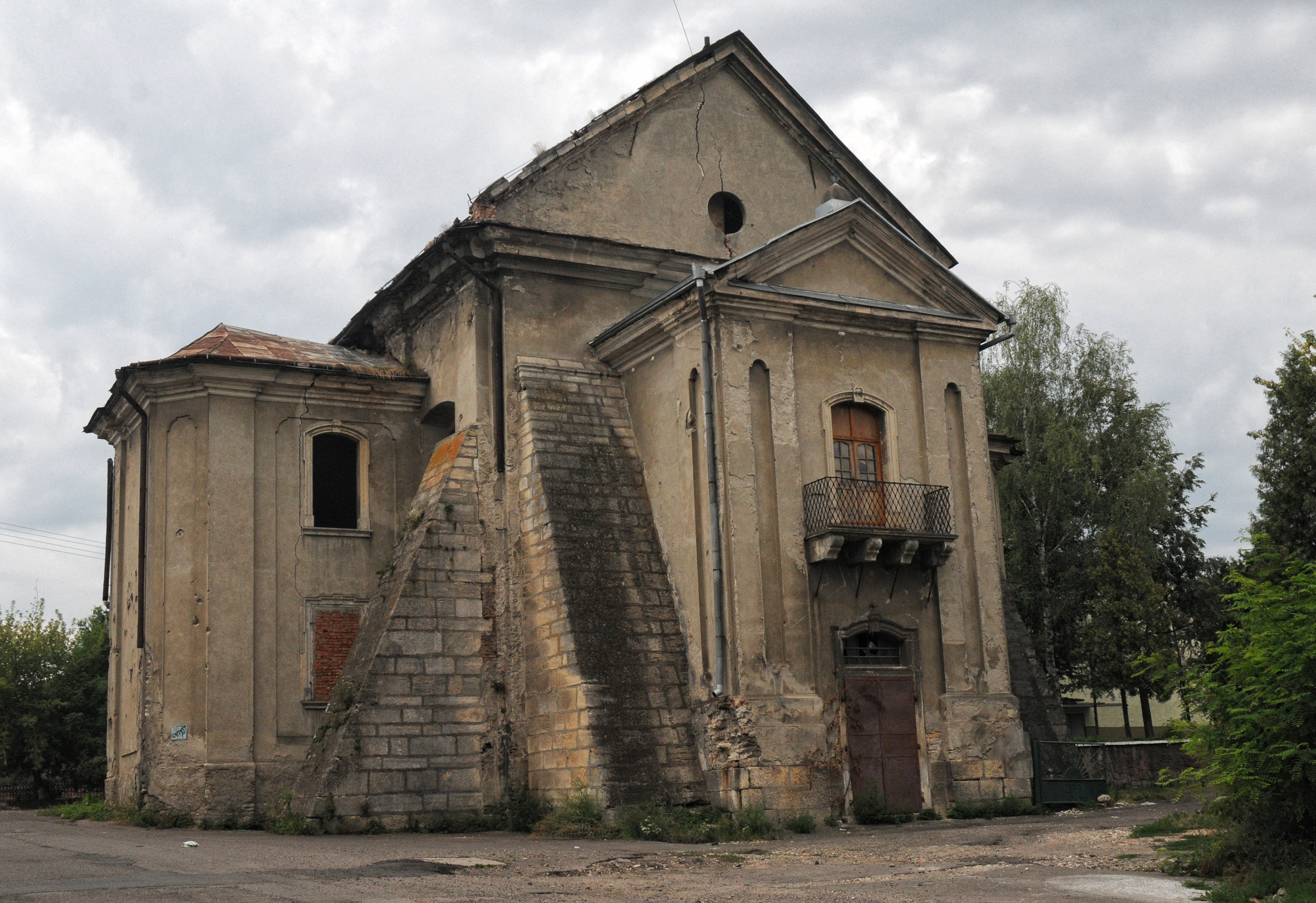
Armenian church in Horodenka (18th century)

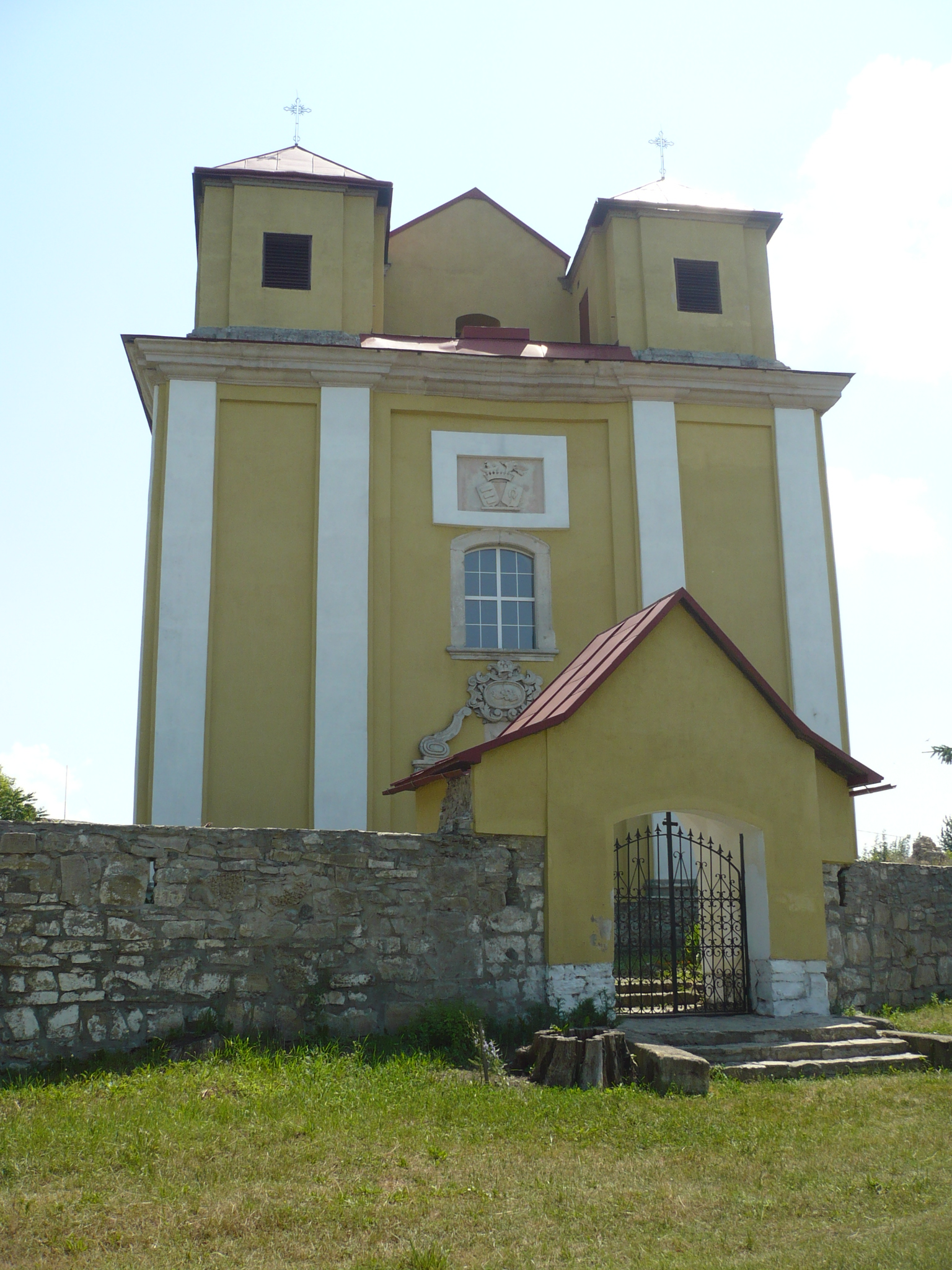
Armenian church in Zhvanets (18th century)

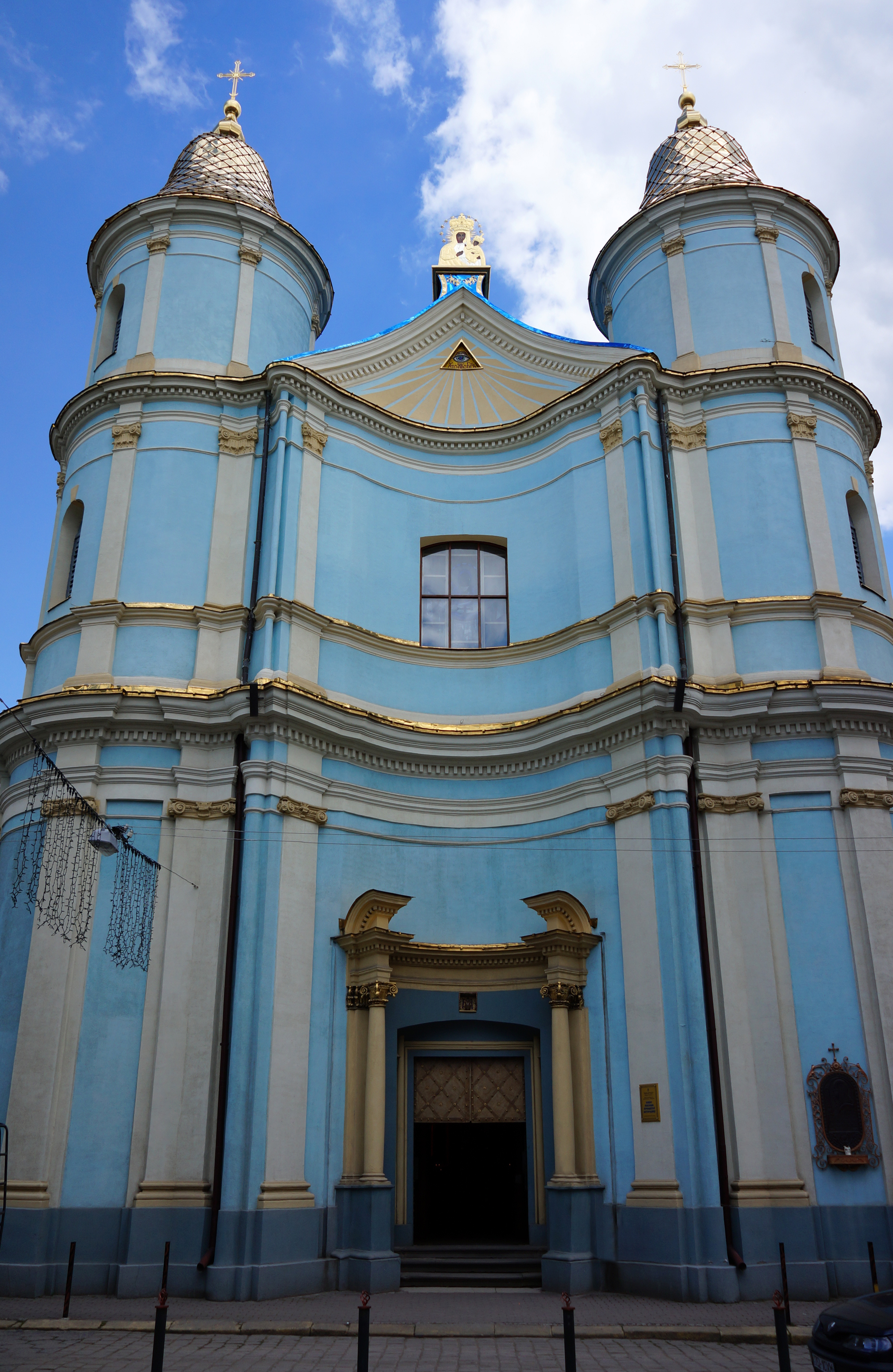
Armenian church in Ivano-Frankivsk (18th century). Now it is the Cathedral of the Intercession of the Most Holy Theotokos of the Orthodox Church of Ukraine.

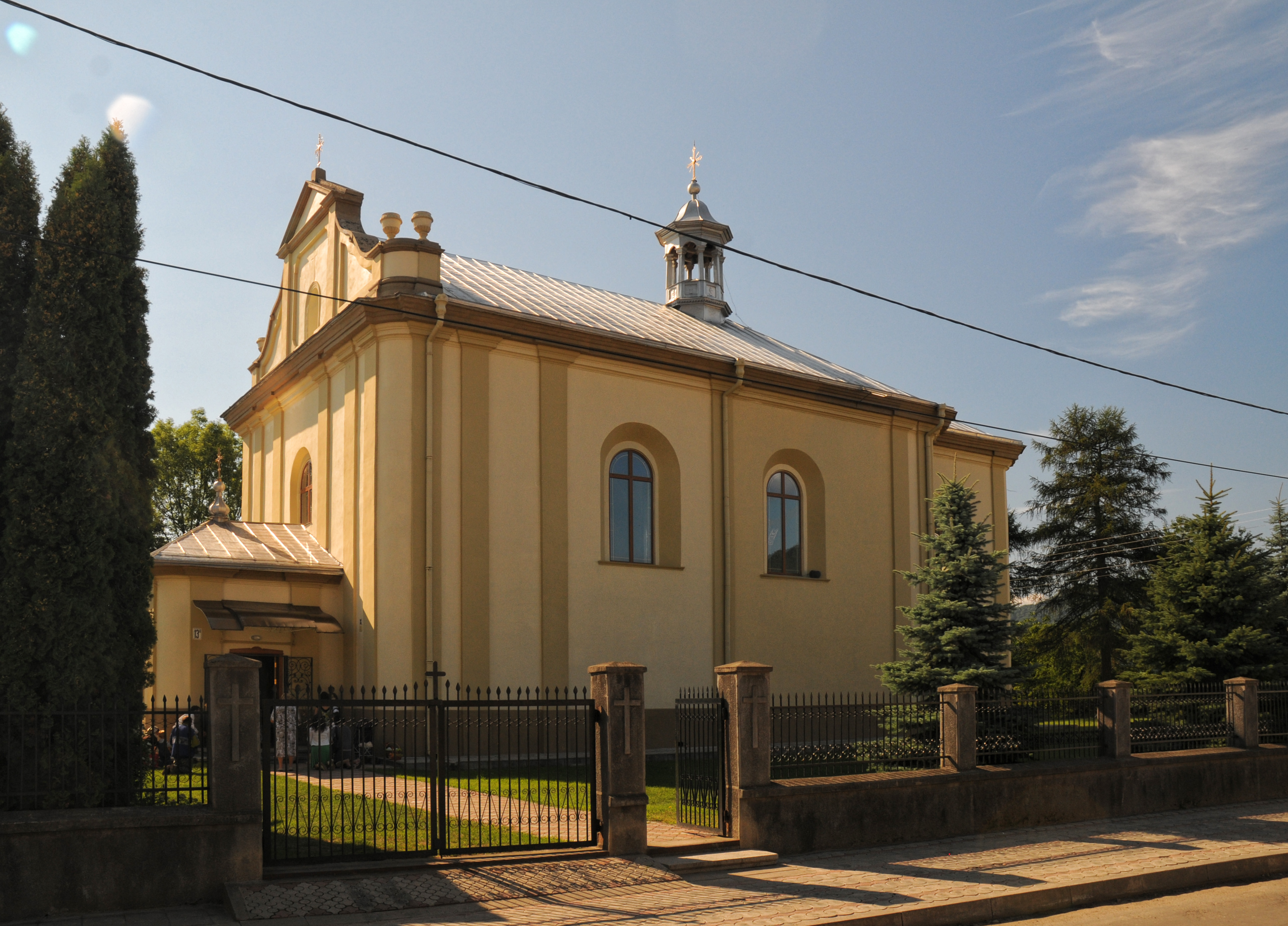
Armenian church in Kuty (18th century)

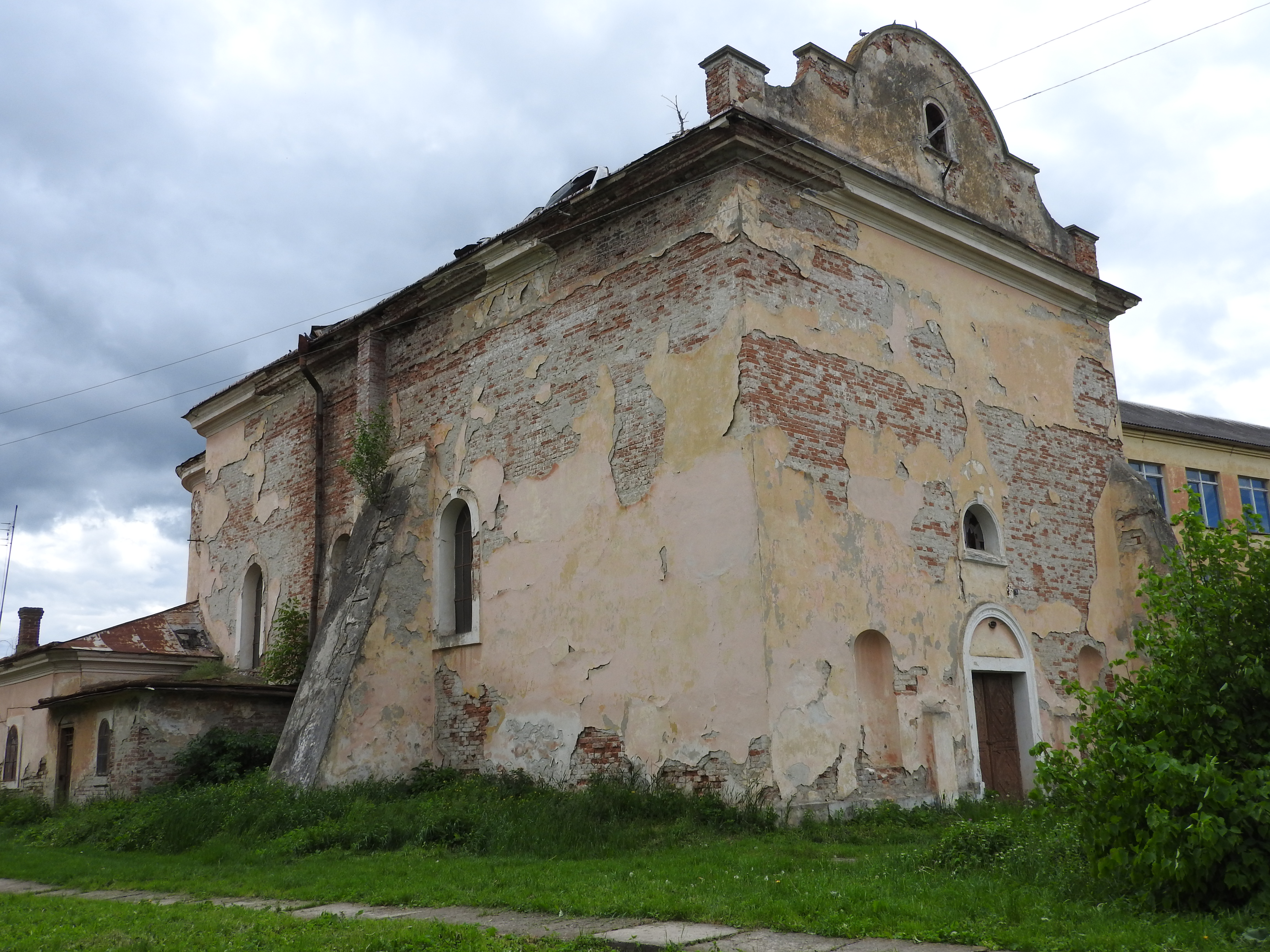
Armenian church in Sniatyn (18th century)

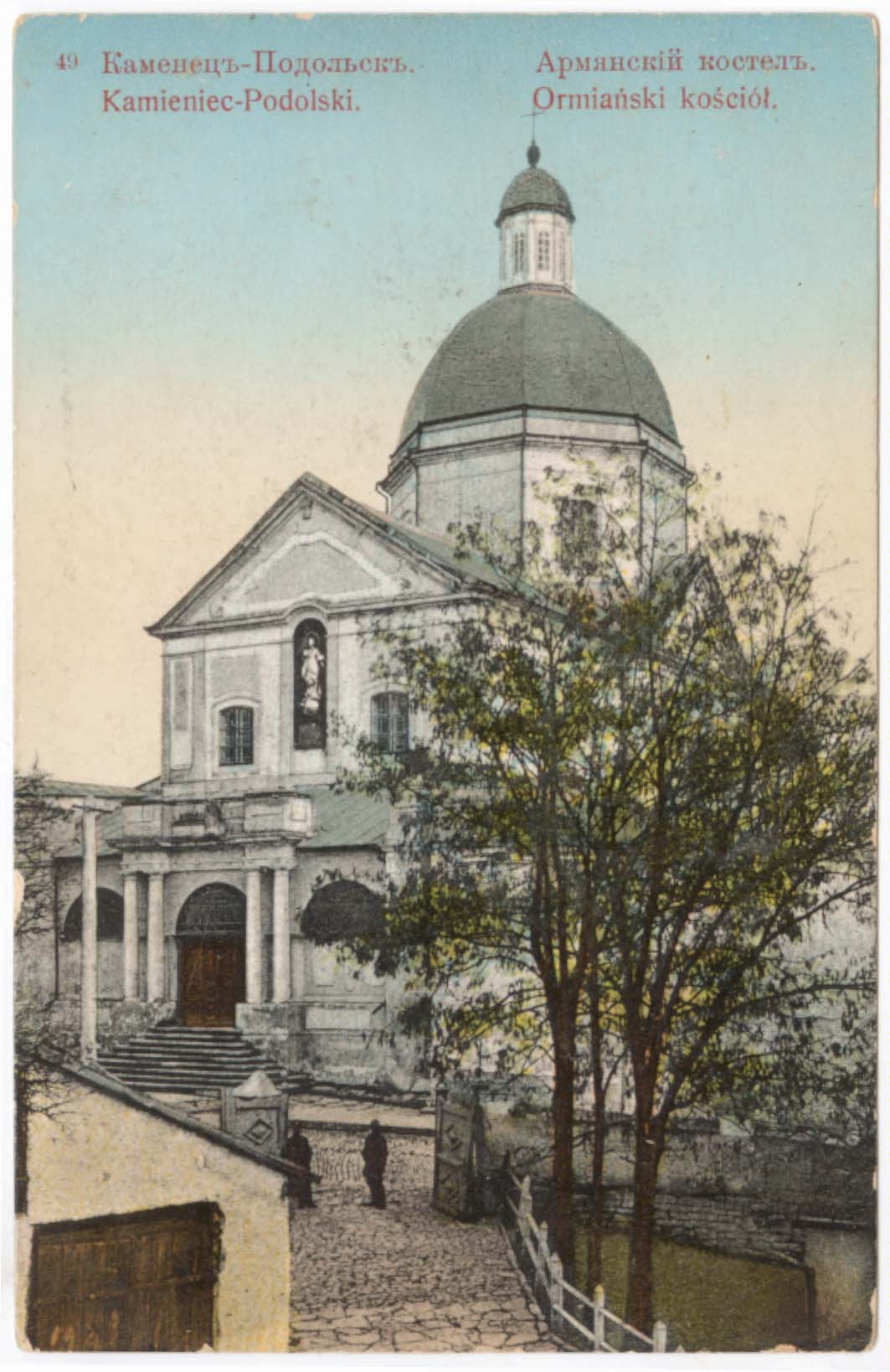
A 19th century postcard of St. Nicholas Armenian Church in Kamenets-Podolsk (destroyed during the 1930s)

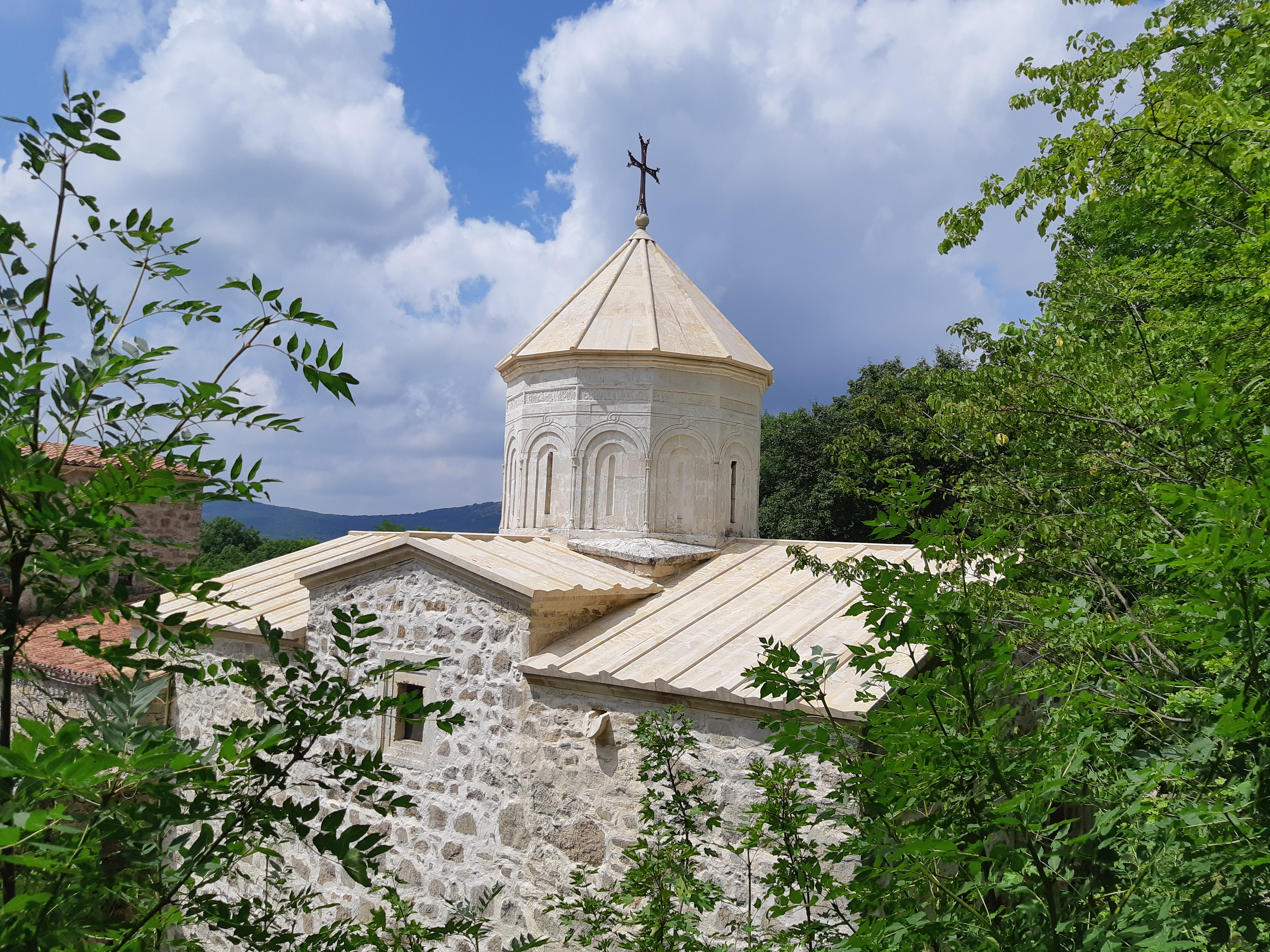
Surb-Nshan Church in the city of Staryi Krym, Autonomous Republic of Crimea

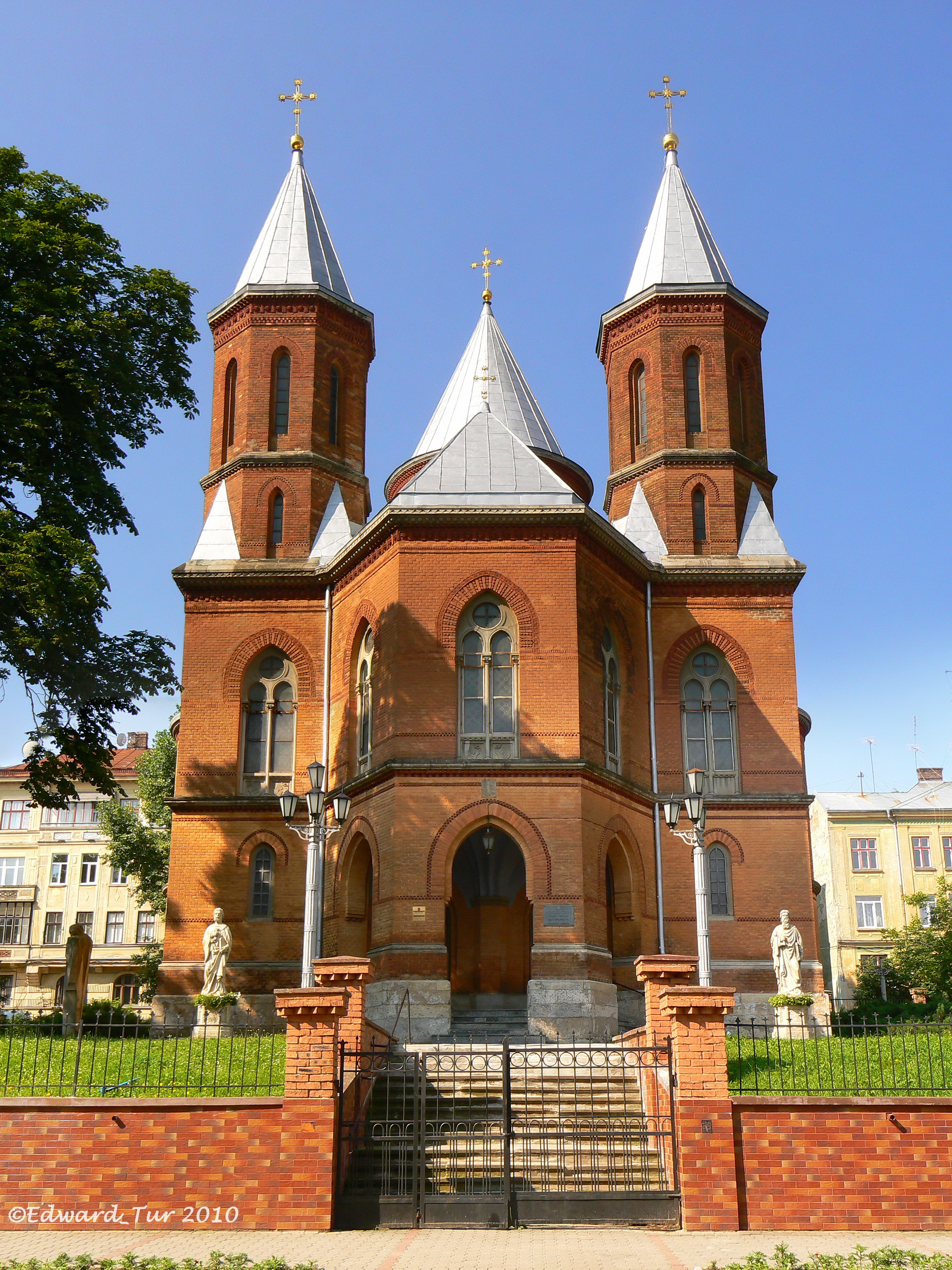
Armenian church in Chernivtsi (19th century)

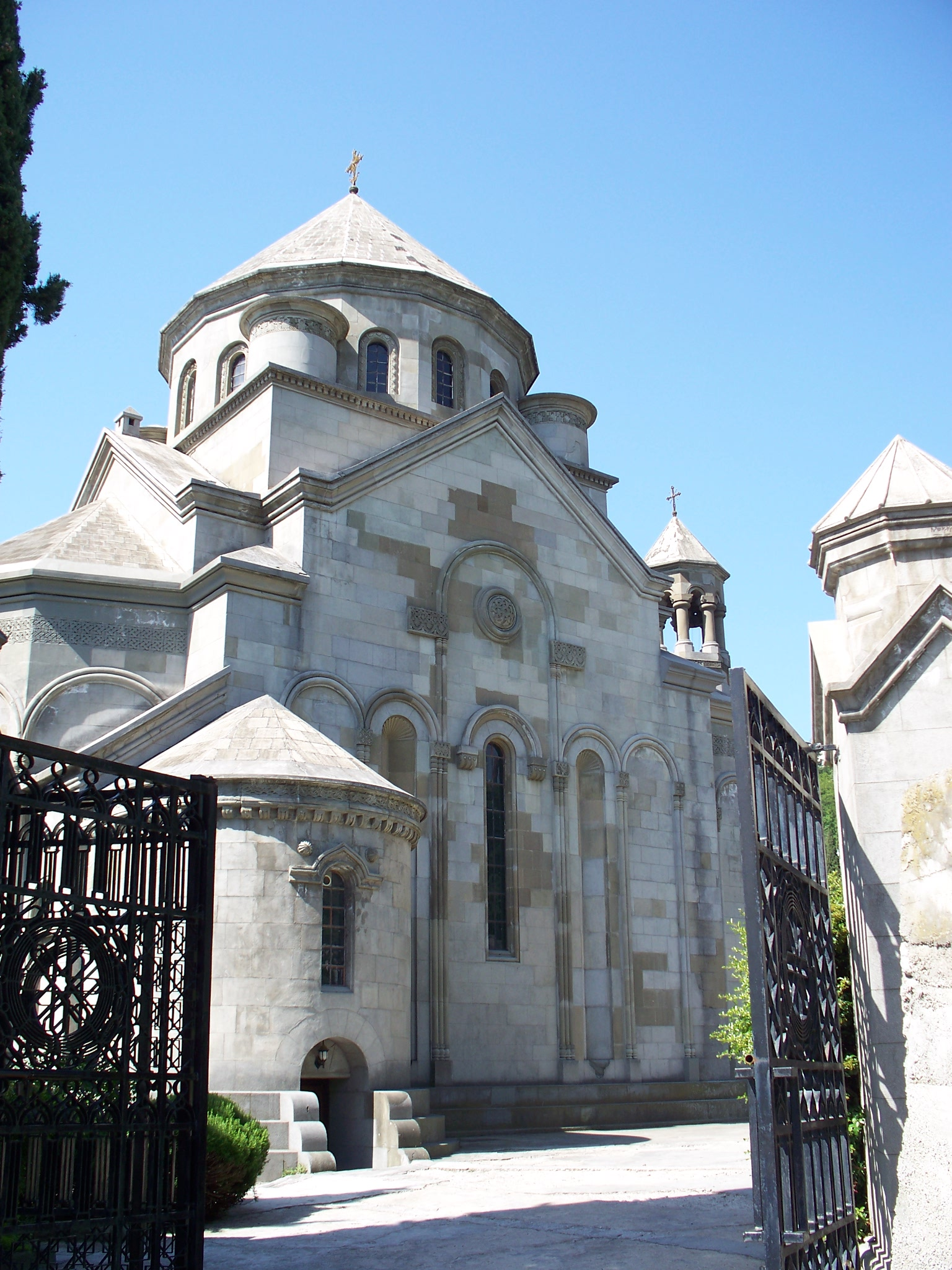
Church of Saint Hripsime in Yalta, Autonomous Republic of Crimea

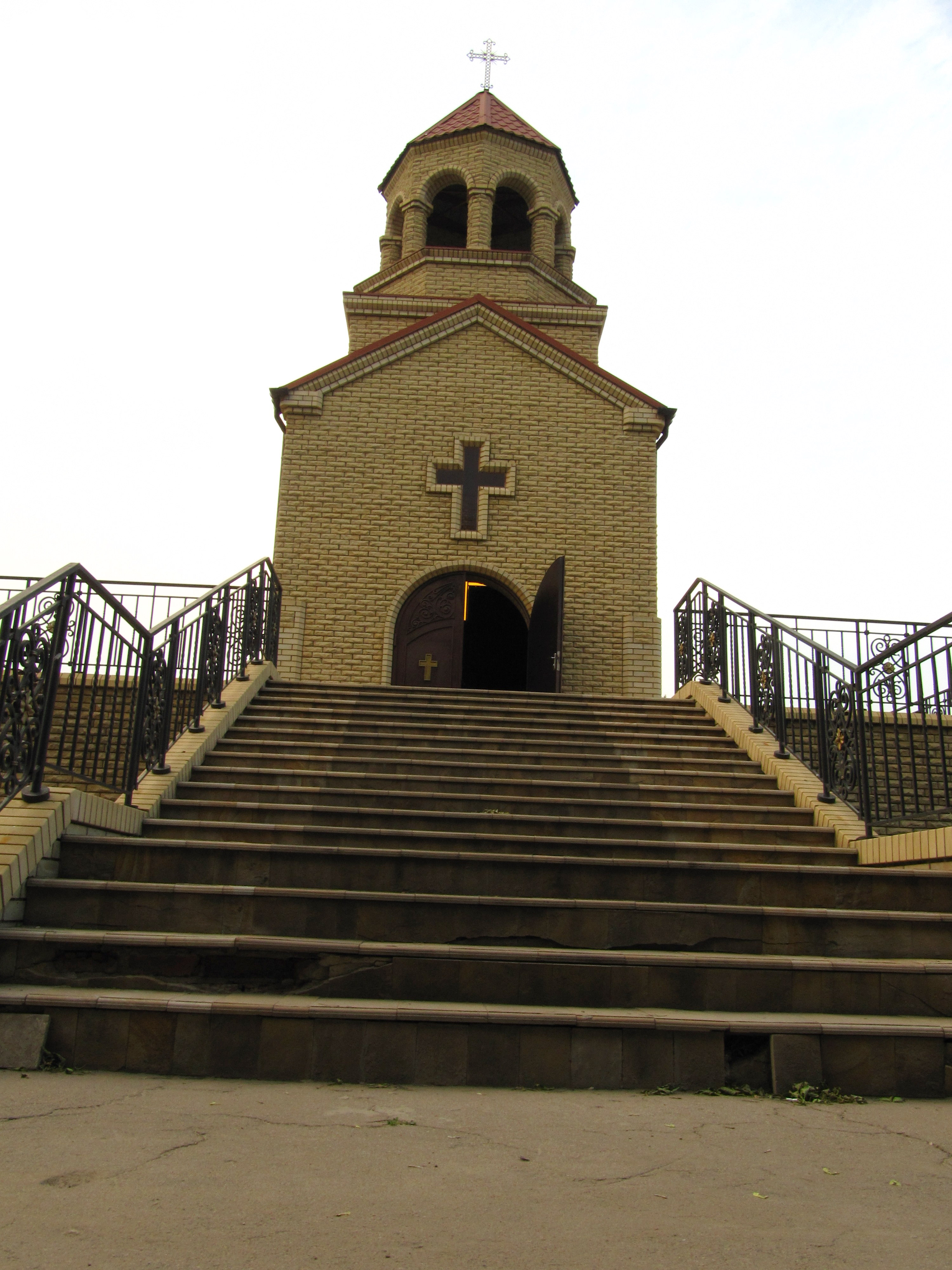
Armenian church in Luhansk

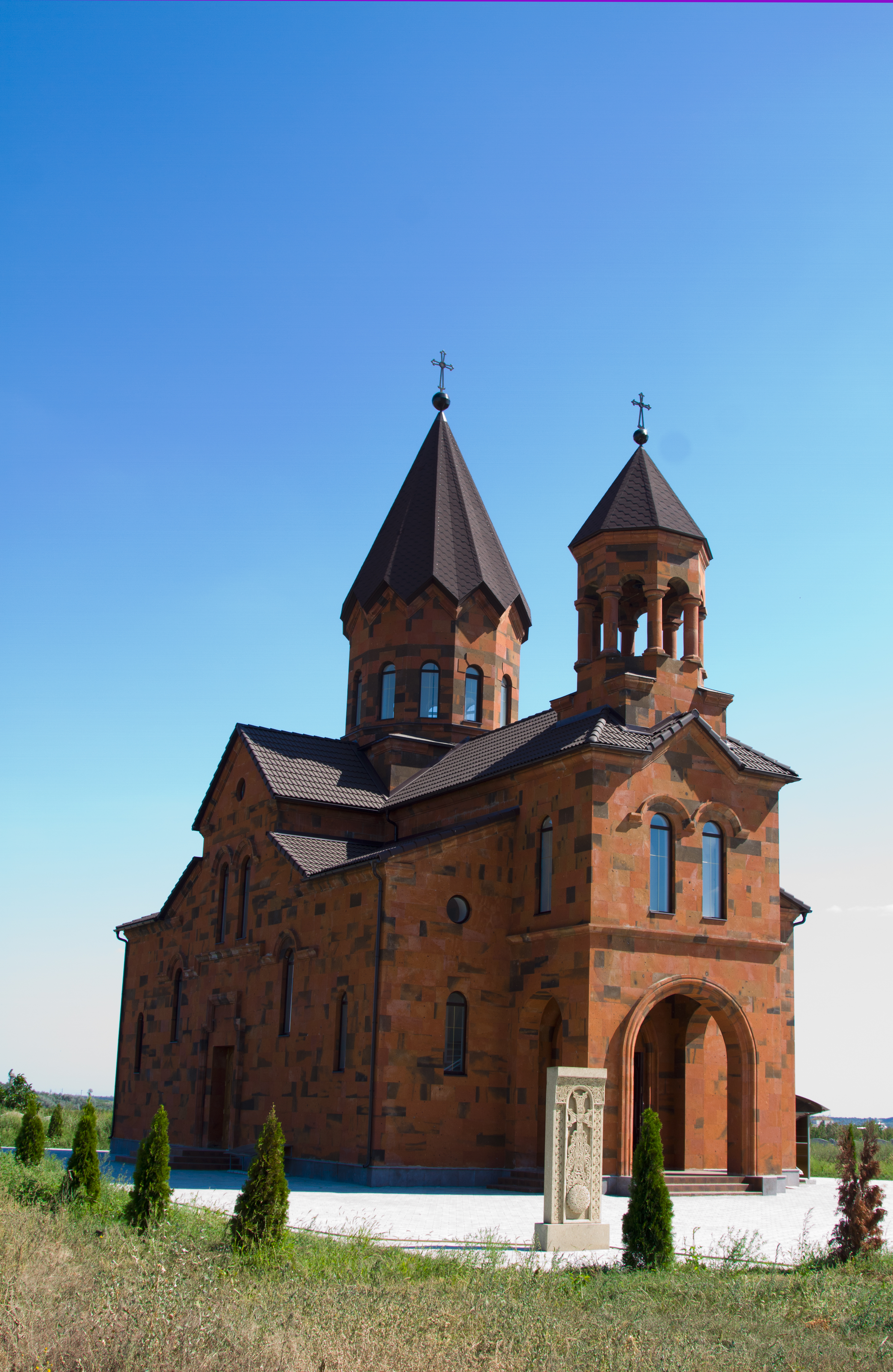
Armenian Surb Gevorg church in Mykolaiv

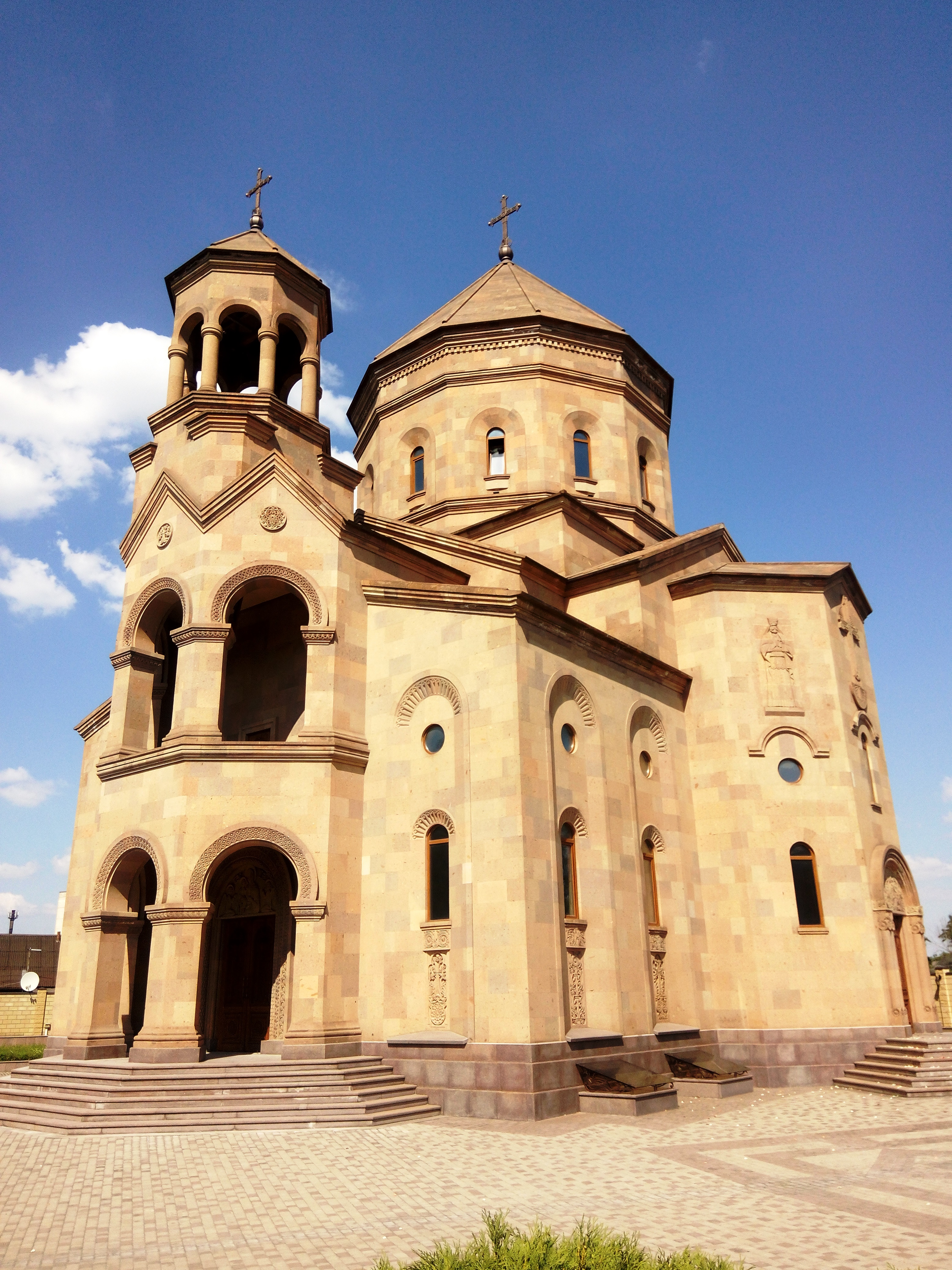
Church of St. Gregory Lusavorich in the city of Dnipro

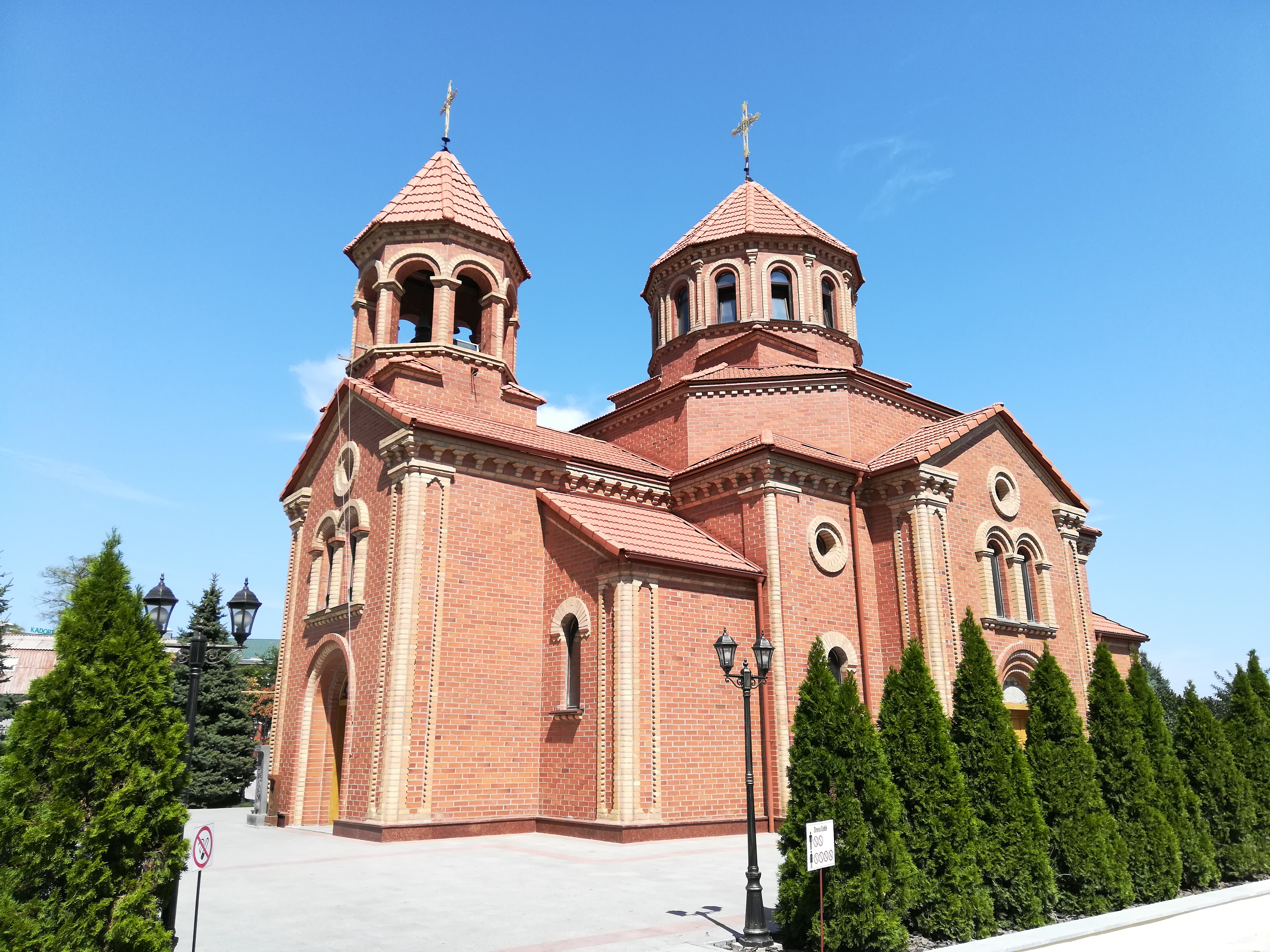
Church of St. Gregory the Illuminator in the city of Odesa

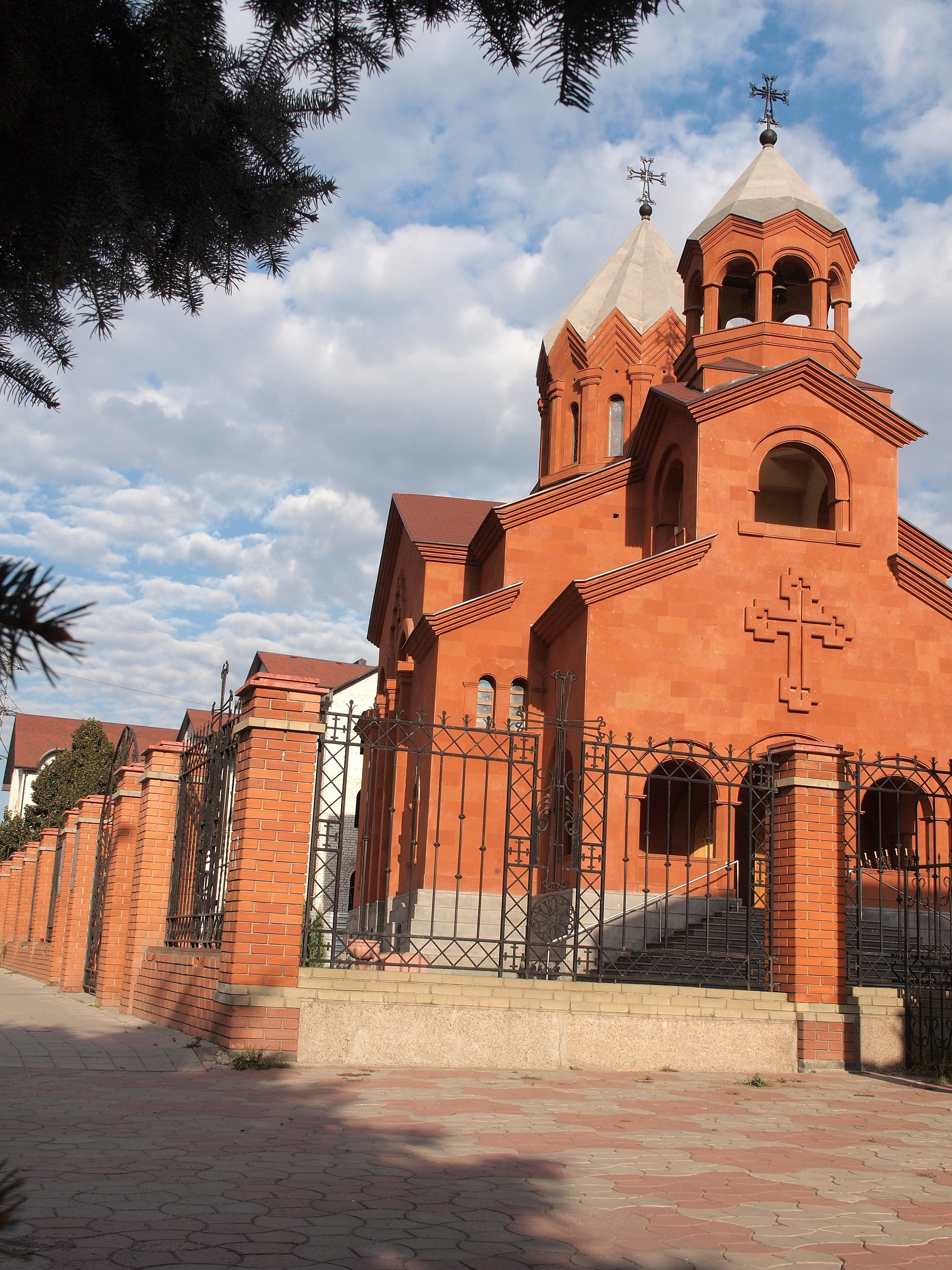
Church of St. Harutyun in the city of Kharkiv

== See also ==
- Armenian diaspora
- Armenians in Crimea
- Armenian Cathedral, Lviv
- Ukrainians in Armenia
- Armenia–Ukraine relations
- Armenians in Moldova
- Armenians in Poland
- Armenians in Russia
- Armenians in Romania
