= Abrahamowicz =

Abrahamowicz is a Polish surname meaning "son of Abraham". Notable people with the surname include:

- Adolf Abrahamowicz (1849–1899), ethnic Armenian Austro-Hungarian writer
- Dawid Abrahamowicz (1839–1926), ethnic Armenian Polish Austro-Hungarian politician, brother of Adolf
- Eugeniusz Abrahamowicz (1851–1905), ethnic Polish Austro-Hungarian politician
- Florian Abrahamowicz (born 1961), ethnic Armenian Austrian priest
- Krzysztof Abrahamowicz (1852–1916), ethnic Armenian Polish politician
- Mikołaj Abramowicz or Abrahamowicz (1590s–1651), Polish-Lithuanian soldier
