= Anatoly Zinevich =

- Анатолій Зіневич
- Born: 20 November 1932; Proskuriv, Ukrainian SSR, Soviet Union
- Died: 1 August 2000 (aged 67); Yerevan, Armenia
- Burial place: Holy Trinity Church St Nicholas Cemetery
- Military career
- Allegiance: Soviet Union; Nagorno-Karabakh; Armenia
- Branch: Soviet Army; Nagorno-Karabakh Defense Army
- Service years: 1953–1997
- Rank: Lieutenant General
- Commands: 40th Army; 7th Army
- Conflicts: Soviet–Afghan War; Ethio-Somali War; First Nagorno-Karabakh War: Battle of Aghdam

Anatoly Vladimirovich Zinevich (Russian: Анатолий Владимирович Зиневич; Ukrainian: Анатолій Володимирович Зіневич; Armenian: Անատոլի Վլադիմիրի Զինևիչ; 20 November 1932 – 1 August 2000) was a Soviet, and later Armenian General-Lieutenant of Ukrainian origin, for whom "Armenia became the second homeland." He was one of the commanders of Nagorno-Karabakh Defense Army.

== Life ==
Zinevich was born on 20 November 1932 in Proskuriv (now Khmelnytskyi), Ukrainian SSR. He entered the Proskurovsky Tank School on 14 August 1950. After he graduated, Zinevich attended and graduated from the Frunze Military Academy and the highest academical courses for the USSR leadership. He was a military advisor in the Ethio-Somali War. Zinevich served eight years as Operations Chief of Staff of the 40th Army in the Soviet–Afghan War, where he was wounded three times.

In 1988, he was appointed Chief of Staff Operations Division of the 7th Army in the Armenian SSR. After a second heart attack and coronary bypass in 1989, he was discharged from the armed forces, but stayed in Armenia. At the request of the first Defence Minister of Armenia Vazgen Sargsyan, Zinevich arrived in the Nagorno-Karabakh Republic in June 1992 and participated in the First Nagorno-Karabakh War.

Zinevich was appointed Chief of Staff of the Nagorno-Karabakh Defense Army in 1994, and from May 1997 to August 2000 he served as Deputy Defense Minister. He was personally involved in combat operations and is the creator of operational systems of protection and management of the NKR Defense Army.

He died on 1 August 2000 in Yerevan. He was buried at the Holy Trinity Church St Nicholas Cemetery in the city Kovrov of the Vladimir region.

== Personal life ==
He was married and had two children.

In memory of Zinevich, a street is named after him in Stepanakert, the capital of Nagorno-Karabakh.

== Awards ==
- Order of the Red Banner
- Order for Service to the Homeland in the Armed Forces of the USSR

== Filmography ==
- "General-Leytenant Anatoli Zinevich", 2000, Yerevan, 30 min., dir. A. Gevorkyan.

== See also ==
- Armenian-Ukrainian relations
- Ukrainians in Armenia
