= Kulali =

Kulali may refer to:

- Aygedzor, Armenia
- Karmir Gyukh, Armenia
- Karmir-Kulali, Armenia
