= Sarkis Ordyan =

Ukrainian-Armenian painter (1918–2003)

- Born: 20 December 1918; Aygedzor, Armenia
- Died: 2003 (aged 84–85)
- Spouse: Arevhat Grigoryan
- Children: 2

Sarkis Ordyan (Armenian: Սարգիս Օրդյան; 20 December 1918 – 2003) was a Ukrainian-Armenian painter.

== Biography ==
He was born to unknown parents in the village of Aigedzor, in the Shamshadin region of Armenia (now part of the Tavush province). Ordyan was married to Arevhat Grigoryan and had two children, Rafik Ordyan and Anahit Ordyan.

Ordyan left Armenia for Moldova where he lived for several years until settling in Ukraine. In the city of Odesa, he became known as "the Lonely Painter". Ordyan died in 2003, and is buried in Odesa, Ukraine.

Few of Ordyan's works survive today. Some are in the possession of private collectors, some of which are in Armenia.
