= Ukrainians in Armenia =

Ethnic group in Armenia

Ukrainians in Armenia (Armenian: Ուկրաինացիները Հայաստանում, romanized: Ukrainats'inery Hayastanum; Ukrainian: Українці Вірменії, romanized: Ukrayintsi Virmeniyi) are people of full or partial ethnic Ukrainian origin who live in Armenia.

== Origins ==
The first Ukrainians in Armenia came in the mid 19th century after the migration to Transcaucasia by “the Cossacks from Minor Russia” to seal the Empire’s southern borders. The main activity of the migrants was agriculture and livestock.

== Statistics ==
According to 2011 census there were 1176 Ukrainians in Armenia, 606 of whom reported Ukrainian as their mother tongue. Ukrainians are fifth-largest ethnic minority in Armenia. According to election code of Armenia parliament seats are reserved to four largest ethnic minorities.

According to 2001 census there were 1633 Ukrainians in Armenia.

According to 1989 census, there were 8.3 thousand Ukrainians in Armenia.

== Notable Armenian Ukrainians ==
- Roman Berezovsky, football coach, born in Yerevan
- Yuriy Koval, football coach and former player, born in Dilijan
- Anatoly Zinevich, Armenian general of Ukrainian origin

== Ukrainian community organisations ==
- Federation of Ukrainians of Armenia "Ukraine" (Ukrainian: Федерація Українців Вірменії «УКРАЇНА»), which publishes a Ukrainian-Armenian language newspaper Dnipro-Slavutych (Ukrainian: "Дніпро-Славутич").
- Vocal and dance ensembles: "Dnipro", "Dzvinochok", "Verbychenka", "Malyatko"
- "Ukraina" Benevolent Fund

== See also ==
- Armenia–Ukraine relations
- Ukrainian diaspora
- Census in Armenia
- Ethnic minorities in Armenia
- Demographics of Armenia
- Anatoly Zinevich
- Russians in Armenia
- Armenians in Ukraine
