= Battle of Aghdam =

Battle of the First Nagorno-Karabakh War

- Part of the First Nagorno-Karabakh War
Date	12 June – 23 July 1993
Location	Aghdam, Azerbaijan
Result	Armenian victory

Belligerents
Armenia (Republic of Artsakh) Nagorno-Karabakh	(Azerbaijan Democratic Republic) Azerbaijan

Commanders and leaders
(Republic of Artsakh) Samvel Babayan (Republic of Artsakh) Anatoly Zinevich (Republic of Artsakh) Vitaly Balasanyan (Republic of Artsakh) Monte Melkonian †	(Azerbaijan Democratic Republic) Talib Mammadov (Azerbaijan Democratic Republic) Nadir Aliyev † (Azerbaijan Democratic Republic) Ibad Huseynov

Strength
6,000 troops, 1 squadron of Mi-24's; ~ 60 tanks	6,000 troops, unknown number of tanks, armoured fighting vehicles and Mi-24 helicopters

Casualties and losses
Unknown	Unknown
- ~130,000 civilians displaced from the town and surrounding Aghdam District

The Battle of Aghdam (June – July 1993) took place on 23 July 1993 during the First Nagorno-Karabakh War, during which Armenian forces captured the Azerbaijani city of Aghdam. The city of Aghdam, which had about 50,000 inhabitants prior to its capture, is located about 30 km northeast of Stepanakert and 5 km east of the border of the former Nagorno-Karabakh Autonomous Oblast. Armenian forces considered Aghdam as a main staging area of Azerbaijani forces for attacks and artillery strikes against the Armenian-populated Nagorno-Karabakh region. A significant part of the surrounding Aghdam District was captured by Armenian forces as well.

According to Human Rights Watch, Armenian forces used the power vacuum in Azerbaijan at the time, and seized Aghdam in July 1993. HRW reported that "during their offensive against Aghdam, Karabakh Armenian forces committed several violations of the rules of war, including hostage-taking, indiscriminate fire, and the forcible displacement of civilians". After the city was seized, it was intentionally looted and burned under orders of Karabakh Armenian authorities in retaliation for Azerbaijan's destruction of the Armenian-populated city of Martakert. BBC reported that every single Azeri house in the town was blown up to discourage return.

== Background ==
With collapse of the USSR and the beginning of the Karabakh war, as a result of the division of the property of the Soviet Armed Forces, in addition to military equipment, ammunition depots also came under the control of Azerbaijan, including the 49th Arsenal of the Main Missile and Artillery Directorate in the city of Aghdam. The leadership of the Azerbaijani army concentrated a large amount of artillery in Aghdam, which was used in the shelling of Askeran, Martakert and Martuni regions of Nagorno-Karabakh. "In early March [1992], Armenian forces began intense shelling of towns located along the eastern border, separating Nagorno-Karabakh from the rest of Azerbaijan. These towns include Agdam and Fizuli, which [were] staging grounds for Azerbaijani operations in Nagorno-Karabakh."

By mid-1993, Azerbaijani forces had lost control of most of the territory of the former Nagorno-Karabakh Autonomous Oblast which they had captured in Operation Goranboy in 1992. In June 1993, the rebellious Azerbaijani colonel Surat Huseynov marched his troops on Baku, leaving the Karabakh front vulnerable in the ensuing political crisis. Armenian forces took advantage of the crisis and advanced on Aghdam. Azerbaijanis in Aghdam and Armenians in Stepanakert and Askeran would exchange heavy artillery fire.

== Battle ==
The battle of Aghdam started on June 12 from north and south of Aghdam using Grad missile launchers, heavy artillery and tanks. The campaign also included simultaneous assault on Tartar. The first attack on the city was repelled by Azerbaijani defense. The clash was marked by the death of Monte Melkonian, a famed Armenian military commander. Armenians were able to capture Farukh mountain 10 km away from Aghdam overlooking the town from the northeast. Khydyrly village around which Azerbaijani forces took up positions fell next.

== Aftermath ==
Despite the national mobilization, Azerbaijani forces were able to retake only a few villages but not the city.

Following the battle of Aghdam, on July 25 ceasefire was announced by Armenian authorities and Azerbaijani government. Several villages such as Chirakhly and the city of Aghdam became ghost towns. Other villages of the Aghdam District were repopulated by the persons displaceds from the former NKAO.

== See also ==
- United Nations Security Council Resolution 853
- Operation Goranboy
