= Suto Mamoian =

Ukrainian entrepreneur and politician

- Суто Мамоян
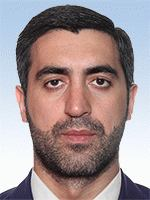
- Official portrait, 2019

People's Deputy of Ukraine
- Incumbent
- Assumed office 29 August 2019
- Constituency: Opposition Platform — For Life, No. 33

Personal details
- Born: 2 December 1981 (age 43)
- Political party: Opposition Platform — For Life

Suto Choloievych Mamoian (Ukrainian: Суто Чолоєвич Мамоян; born 2 December 1981) is a Ukrainian entrepreneur and politician. He is a People's Deputy of Ukraine in the 9th Ukrainian Verkhovna Rada.

== Biography ==
In 2020 Mamoian lived in the village of Nalyvaykivka, in the Makariv district of Kyiv region. He is the founder of LLC "Mehapolis-Hrup", and the deputy director of the LLC "Miasprom".

== Parliamentary activities ==
In the early parliamentary elections of 2019, he was a candidate for people's deputies from the political party "Opposition Platform — For Life", on general state multi-mandate constituency, Number 33 on the list. On 29 August 2019, he took the oath of People's Deputy of Ukraine.

He is a member of the Verkhovna Rada of Ukraine Committee on Law Enforcement and the Standing Delegation in the Parliamentary Dimension of the Central European Initiative.

Furthermore, Mamolan is the head of a group for inter-parliamentary relations with the Islamic Republic of Afghanistan and the co-chairman of a group for inter-parliamentary relations with the Republic of Iraq. He is member of the groups for inter-parliamentary relations with the United Arab Emirates, Armenia, the United States of America, the State of Israel and the United Kingdom of Great Britain and Northern Ireland.
