= Eugeniusz Abrahamowicz =

Polish politician, lawyer and landowner

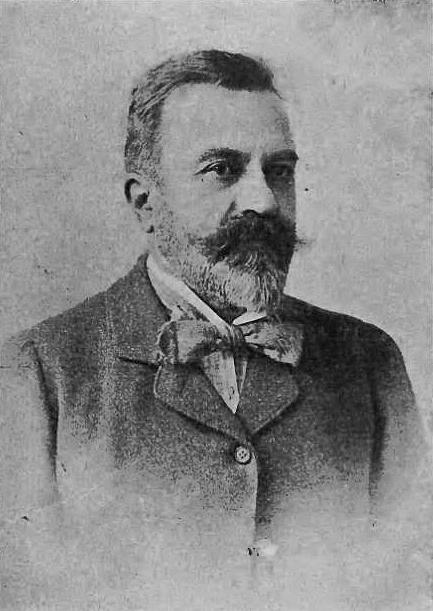
Eugeniusz Abrahamowicz's Portrait

Eugeniusz Abrahamowicz (1851 - 1905) was a Polish conservative politician, lawyer, and landowner. In the years 1891–1905 he was a Member of the Austrian parliament, and was a spokesman for the interests of landowners in Lviv.
