= Krzysztof Abrahamowicz =

Polish politician

Krzysztof Abrahamowicz (1852–1916) was a politician from Congress Poland.

Abrahamowicz was of Armenian descent. He was a member of the Sejm, representing a defunct Armenian-Polish party. His views were conservative in nature.

Abrahamowicz died on 20 June 1916.
