= Armenia–Ukraine relations =

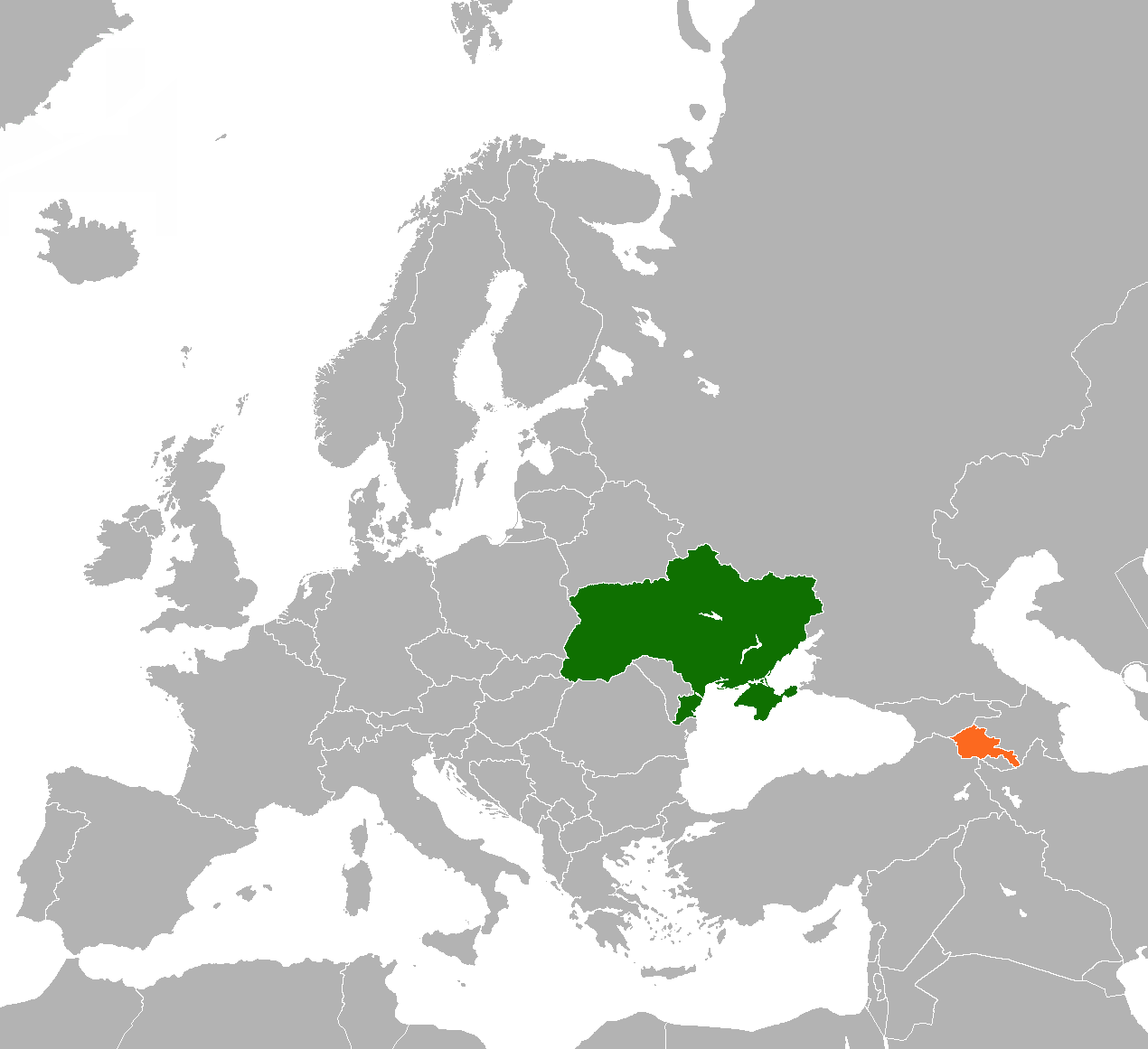

- Ukraine: Armenia

Diplomatic mission
- Embassy of Ukraine, Yerevan: Embassy of Armenia, Kyiv

Armenia–Ukraine relations are the bilateral relations between Ukraine and Armenia, which were established on 25 December 1991. Until then, both were member republics of the Soviet Union. Today, the countries are both members of the World Trade Organization, Organization for Security and Co-operation in Europe, the United Nations, and the Eastern Partnership initiative of the EU. Currently, Ukraine has the 5th largest Armenian community in the world. The Embassy of Armenia in Kyiv opened in 1993. The Embassy of Ukraine in Yerevan opened in 1996. The current Ambassador of Armenia to Ukraine is Vladimir Karapetyan. The current Ambassador of Ukraine to Armenia is Ivan Khukhta.

== Economic cooperation ==
The main principles of economic cooperation between Ukraine and Armenia were outlined in the Treaty of Friendship and Cooperation between Ukraine and Armenia, which entered into force on May 26, 1997. Today, Ukraine and Armenia cooperate within the framework of the "Joint Intergovernmental Ukrainian-Armenian Commission on Economic Cooperation". Ukrainian exports to Armenia are metallurgical, chemical, agricultural, food goods and equipment, grain crops, alcoholic beverages, buses, and tires. Armenian exports to Ukraine electrical products, brandy, juices, tomato paste, mineral waters, cigarettes, and agricultural goods. For 9 months in 2015, the trade turnover between the countries amounted to 94.2 million US dollars, while the trade in goods amounted to 76.7 million dollars.

Exports from 2017-2020
Year	Exports from Ukraine to Armenia (millions)	Exports from Armenia to Ukraine (millions)
2020	126.98	26.40
2019	148.46	24.61
2018	152.47	18.25
2017	114.4	10.19

The turnover of goods between Ukraine and Armenia for January-May 2022 amounted to $33.21 million, decreasing by 27.7%. Ukrainian exports to Armenia in the same period amounted to $29.01 million, decreasing by 26.5%. Armenian imports to Ukraine in the same period amounted to $4.1 million, decreasing by 46.4%. The balance of trade in goods and services for the relevant period in Ukraine is positive, at $24.81 million.

== Cultural ties ==
Lviv is home to the Armenian Catholic Church in Ukraine. Since the Soviet Union captured Lviv, its see remains "vacant". Since 1997, Lviv also became a center of Ukrainian eparchy (diocese) of the Armenian Apostolic Church (Orthodox).

The city of Armyansk, originally as Ermeni Bazzar, is named after the Crimean Armenian community.

== Ambassadors ==
=== Ambassadors of Ukraine in Armenia ===
- Aleksander Bozhko (1996–2001)
- Volodymyr Tyahlo (February 2, 2002 – June 2005)
- Aleksander Bozhko (June 2005 – July 22, 2010)
- Ivan Khukhta (July 22, 2010 – present)

=== Ambassadors of Armenia in Ukraine ===
- Andranik Manukyan (April 26, 2010 – August 2, 2018)
- Tigran Seiranian (December 28, 2018 – June 1, 2021)
- Vladimir Karapetyan (June 1, 2021 – present)

== High level visits ==
Guest	Host	Place of visit	Date of visit
(Ukraine) President Leonid Kuchma	(Armenia) President Levon Ter-Petrosyan	Yerevan	13-14 May 1996
(Armenia) President Levon Ter-Petrosyan	(Ukraine) President Leonid Kuchma	Kyiv	22 July 1997
(Armenia) President Robert Kocharyan	(Ukraine) President Leonid Kuchma	Kyiv	1-2 March 2001
(Ukraine) President Leonid Kuchma	(Armenia) President Robert Kocharyan	Yerevan	October 10, 2002
(Armenia) President Serzh Sargsyan	(Ukraine) President Viktor Yushchenko	Kyiv	July 28–29, 2008
(Armenia) President Serzh Sargsyan	(Ukraine) President Viktor Yushchenko	Kyiv	February 25, 2010
(Armenia) President Serzh Sargsyan	(Ukraine) President Viktor Yanukovych	Kyiv	July 1–2, 2011
(Armenia) President Serzh Sargsyan	(Ukraine) President Viktor Yanukovych	Kyiv	July 1–2, 2012
(Ukraine) President Volodymyr Zelenskyy	(Armenia) Prime Minister Nikol Pashinyan and President Vahagn Khachaturian	Yerevan	May 3-5 2026

== Ukrainians in Armenia ==
The Ukrainian community in Armenia began to form in the 19th century. As early as 1858, about 150 people were resettled from the territory of Ukraine to the modern territory of Armenia, where the village of Mykolaivka (now Amrakits, Stepanavan district) was founded. The majority of Ukrainians who currently live in Armenia arrived there in the post-WWII period (1945-1990). According to the 2001 census, 1,633 ethnic Ukrainians lived in Armenia by then.

The Yerevan Scientific and Educational Institute, created based on the Yerevan branch of the West Ukrainian National University, operates in Armenia. It is the only Ukrainian higher education institution in the South Caucasus.

== Recent events ==
Throughout the Russo-Ukrainian War from 2014 to 2021 Armenia consistently supported Russia in voting against Ukraine at the United Nations, in particular voting against United Nations General Assembly Resolution 68/262 on the territorial integrity of Ukraine. In the Nagorno-Karabakh conflict, Ukraine has consistently supported Azerbaijan's territorial integrity and voted for United Nations General Assembly Resolution 62/243 demanding an "immediate, complete and unconditional withdrawal of all Armenian forces from all the occupied territories of Azerbaijan" and reaffirming "the inalienable right of the population expelled from the occupied territories of the Republic of Azerbaijan to return to their homes".

However, following the 2022 Russian invasion of Ukraine, Armenia ended its support for Russia's positions at the United Nations, and called for dialogue to end the war. On 1 June 2023, during an interview, Pashinyan had stated, "Armenia is not an ally of Russia in the war in Ukraine." On 7 September 2023, Anna Hakobyan, the wife of Armenian Prime Minister Nikol Pashinyan met with Ukrainian President Volodymyr Zelenskyy and his wife Olena Zelenska in Kyiv, Ukraine. She had traveled to Kyiv at the invitation of the First Lady of Ukraine to participate in the "Summit of First Ladies and Gentlemen." Hakobyan personally handed over 1,000+ smartphones, tablets and laptops for primary schoolchildren at the Ministry of Education and Science of Ukraine in Kyiv. This was Armenia's first delivery of humanitarian aid for Ukraine since the Russian invasion of Ukraine started in February 2022.

In October 2023, Armenia participated in a multilateral peace forum, as part of Ukraine's Peace Formula, hosted in Malta. Armen Grigoryan, head of the Security Council of Armenia met with Ukrainian president Volodymyr Zelenskyy.

In June 2024, Armenian Ambassador to Ukraine Vladimir Karapetyan and Tigran Ter-Margaryan, the head of the Nor Nork District of Yerevan visited the site of Russian war crimes Bucha and condemned Russian aggression in their speeches. In response, Russia sent a protest note to Armenia and recalled their ambassador.

On 15 June 2024, Armen Grigoryan, head of the Security Council of Armenia, participated in the June 2024 Ukraine peace summit in Lucerne, Switzerland.

== Resident diplomatic missions ==
- Armenia has an embassy in Kyiv.
- Ukraine has an embassy in Yerevan.
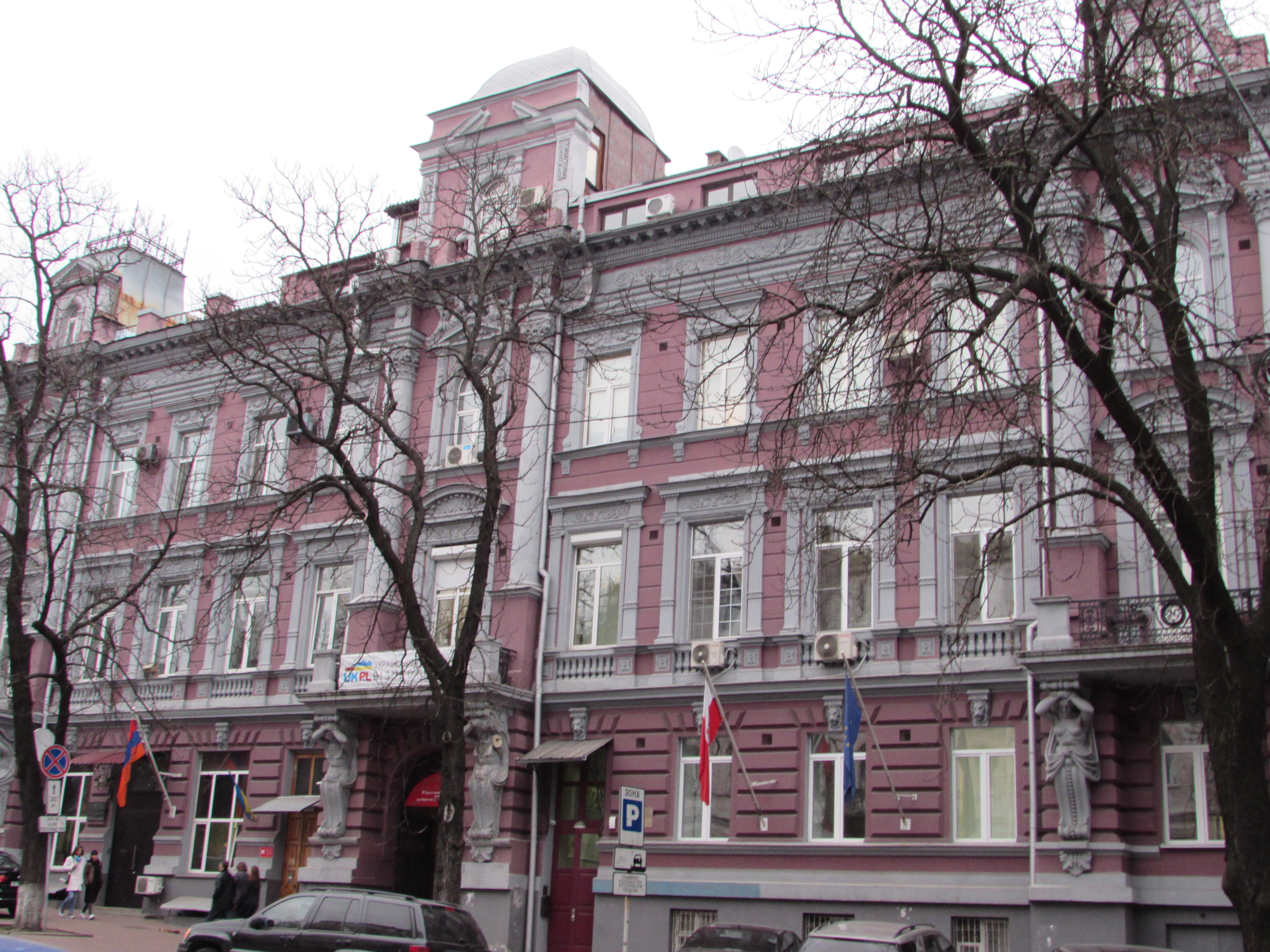
Embassy of Armenia in Kyiv

== See also ==
- Foreign relations of Armenia
- Foreign relations of Ukraine
- Armenia–Russia relations
- Armenians in Ukraine
- Ukrainians in Armenia
