= Dawid Abrahamowicz =

Polish politician and social activist

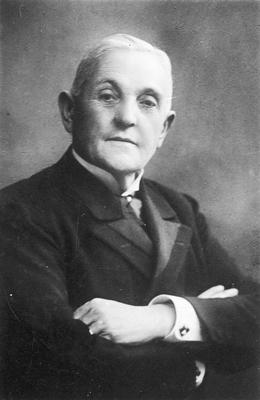
- Born: 30 June 1839; Torhovytsya, Austrian Empire
- Died: 24 December 1926 (aged 87); Lwów, Second Polish Republic
- Burial place: Lychakiv Cemetery
- Awards: Commander of Order of Leopold, Order of the Iron Crown

Dawid Abrahamowicz (Armenian: Դավիթ Աբրահամովիչ, Polish: Dawid Abrahamowicz, Ukrainian: Давид Абрагамович; 1839–1926) was a Polish conservative politician and social activist of Armenian descent. Brother of Adolf Abrahamowicz, from 1863–1918 he was a member of the Diet of Galicia and Lodomeria, from 1875–1918 a member of the Imperial Council, and from 1881–1909 a member of the Chamber of Deputies.
