= Meri Akopyan =

Ukrainian government minister

- Акопян Мері Андраніківна
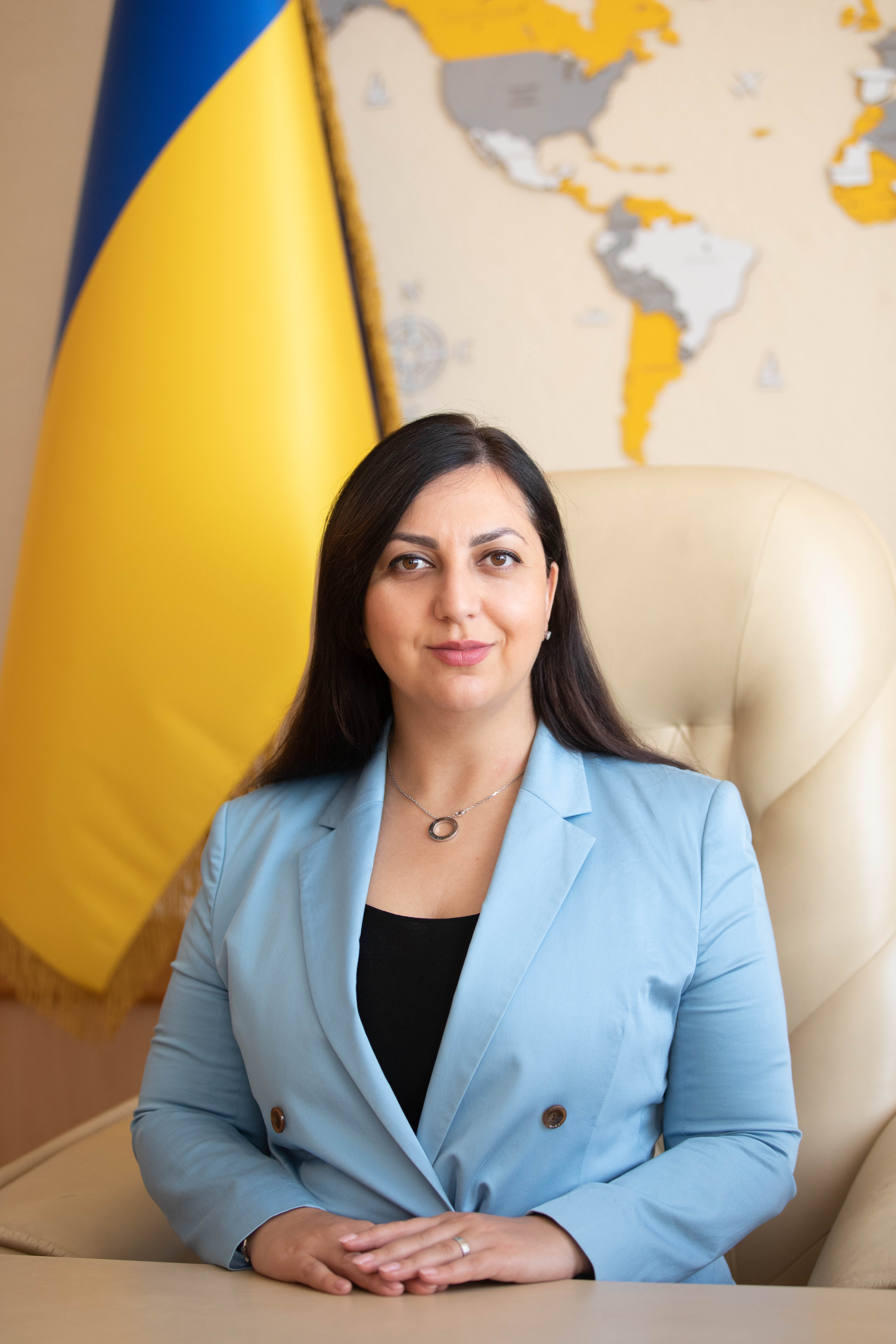

Deputy Minister of Internal Affairs of Ukraine
- Incumbent
- Assumed office 4 August 2021
- President: Volodymyr Zelenskyy
- Prime Minister: Denys Shmyhal
- Minister: Denys Monastyrsky

Personal details
- Born: 24 June 1984 (age 41) Autonomous Republic of Crimea
- Education: Tavrida National V.I. Vernadsky University National Academy of Internal Affairs

Meri Andranikivna Akopyan (Ukrainian: Мері Андраніківна Акопян; born 24 June 1984, Autonomous Republic of Crimea) is a philologist, Director of the Department of International Cooperation and European Integration of the Ministry of Internal Affairs of Ukraine (2015-2021). She was previously the Deputy Minister of Internal Affairs of Ukraine (starting 4 August 2021).

== Education ==
From 2001 to 2006, she was studying at the Vernadsky Taurida National University, majoring in "Oriental studies: Arabic language and literature", received a master's degree with honors.

In 2005, she studied at Cairo State University.

2007–2009 – she was a postgraduate student of the Chair for the Department of Eastern Philology of Vernadsky Taurida National University.

In 2017–2019, she was studying at the National Academy of Internal Affairs at the Faculty of Law and received a master's degree in Law.

During 2017-2018, she has also obtained a master's degree in Public Administration while studying at the Kyiv-Mohyla Business School.

As part of her professional development, Meri Akopyan has participated in educational programs by leading international educational institutions, in particular, Geneva College for Security Policy, the European Academy of Berlin, George C. Marshall European Center for Security Studies, European Security and Defense College, the National University "Kyiv-Mohyla Academy", the National Academy of Public Administration under the President of Ukraine, the School of Public Management and the Ukrainian Catholic University under the program held in partnership with the Stanford University`s Center.

== Career ==
In 2006-2008, she was working as a specialist of the PR Marketing Advertising Department at the Advertising and Exhibition Company "Dominanta".

During 2007-2012, Meri Akopyan was a teacher of the Department of Oriental Philology of Vernadsky Taurida National University of the following disciplines: Arabic Language, the History of the Arab countries, Arabic Literature.

From 2008 to 2013, she was a head of the PR Marketing Advertising Department at the Advertising and Exhibition Company "Dominanta" working part-time.

From 2009 to 2012, she was also working part-time as a TV presenter, an author of TV programmes and chief editor of the Spivdruzhnist’ editorial office at the State TV and Radio broadcast “Crimea”.

During 2014–2015, she was a Chief Advisor to the Main Directorate for Foreign Affairs of the Administration of the President of Ukraine.

From July to November 2015, she was working as a Head of the International Relations Department of the Ministry of Internal Affairs of Ukraine.

During 2015-2021, Meri Akopyan was a Director of the Department of International Cooperation of the Ministry of Internal Affairs of Ukraine.

On 4 August 2021 she was appointed as the Deputy Minister of Internal Affairs of Ukraine.

Since January 2019, she has been working part-time as a lecturer of Arabic language at the Institute of International Relations of Taras Shevchenko National University of Kyiv.

== Honorary distinctions ==
- Council of Ministers of the Autonomous Republic of Crimea, Acknowledgment (2009);
- Ministry of Culture of the Autonomous Republic of Crimea, Charter (2010);
- Ministry of Culture of Ukraine, Acknowledgment (2016);
- Ministry of Internal Affairs, Acknowledgment (2017).

== Personal life ==
Meri Akopyan is not married.

Meri Akopyan speaks English, Arabic, Armenian, Turkish and Ukrainian.
