= Aygedzor =

Aygedzor Այգեձոր
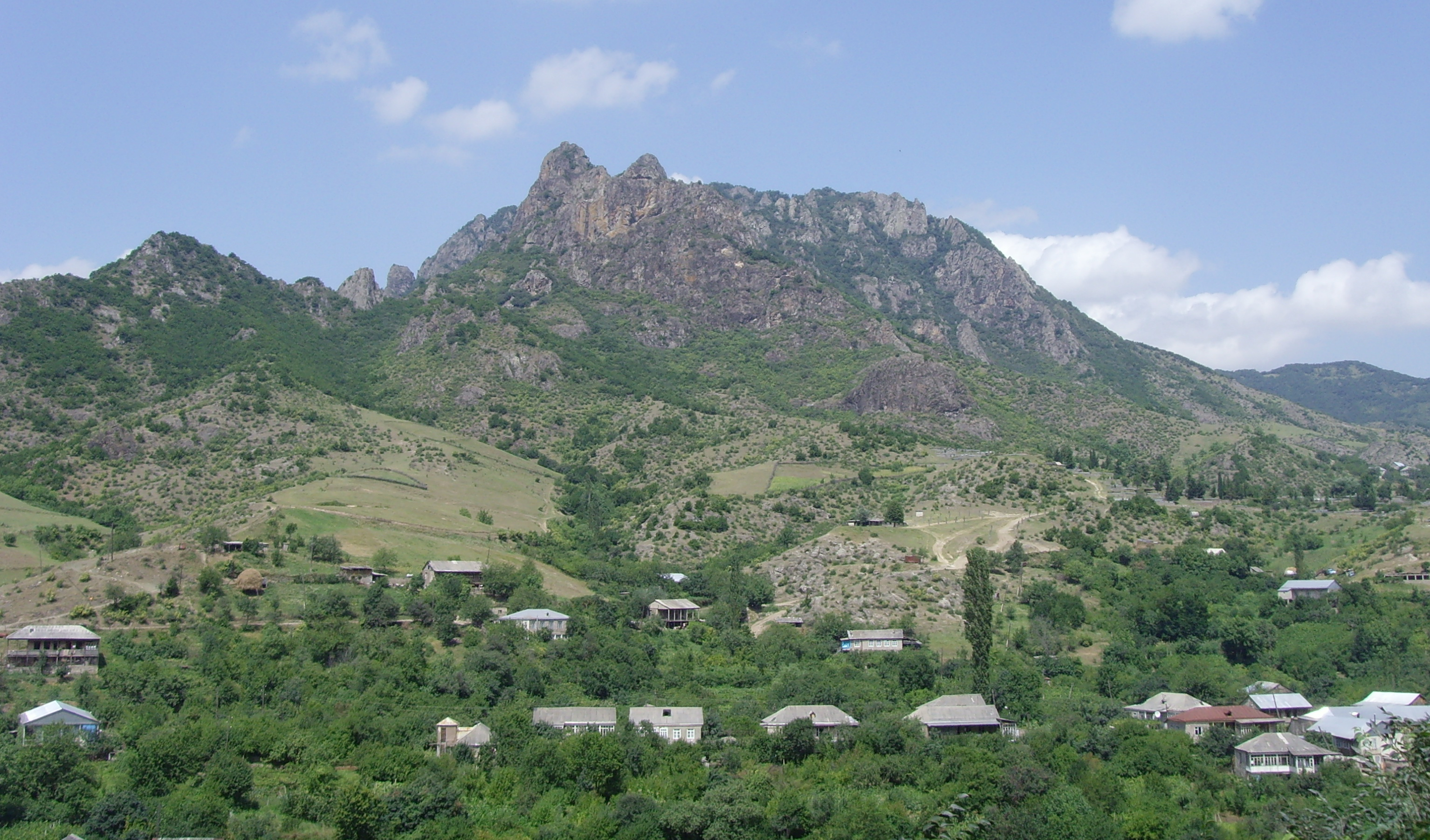
- A view of Aygedzor

- Location within Armenia Location within Tavush
- Coordinates: 40°49′32″N 45°32′27″E
- Country: Armenia
- Province: Tavush
- Municipality: Berd
- Elevation: 1,830 m (6,000 ft)

Population (2011)
  - Total: 2,044
- Time zone: UTC+4 (AMT)

Aygedzor (Armenian: Այգեձոր) is a village in the Berd Municipality of the Tavush Province of Armenia. The Aghjkaberd mountain fortress is located close to Aygedzor.

== Toponymy ==
The village was previously known as Kulali.

== Gallery ==
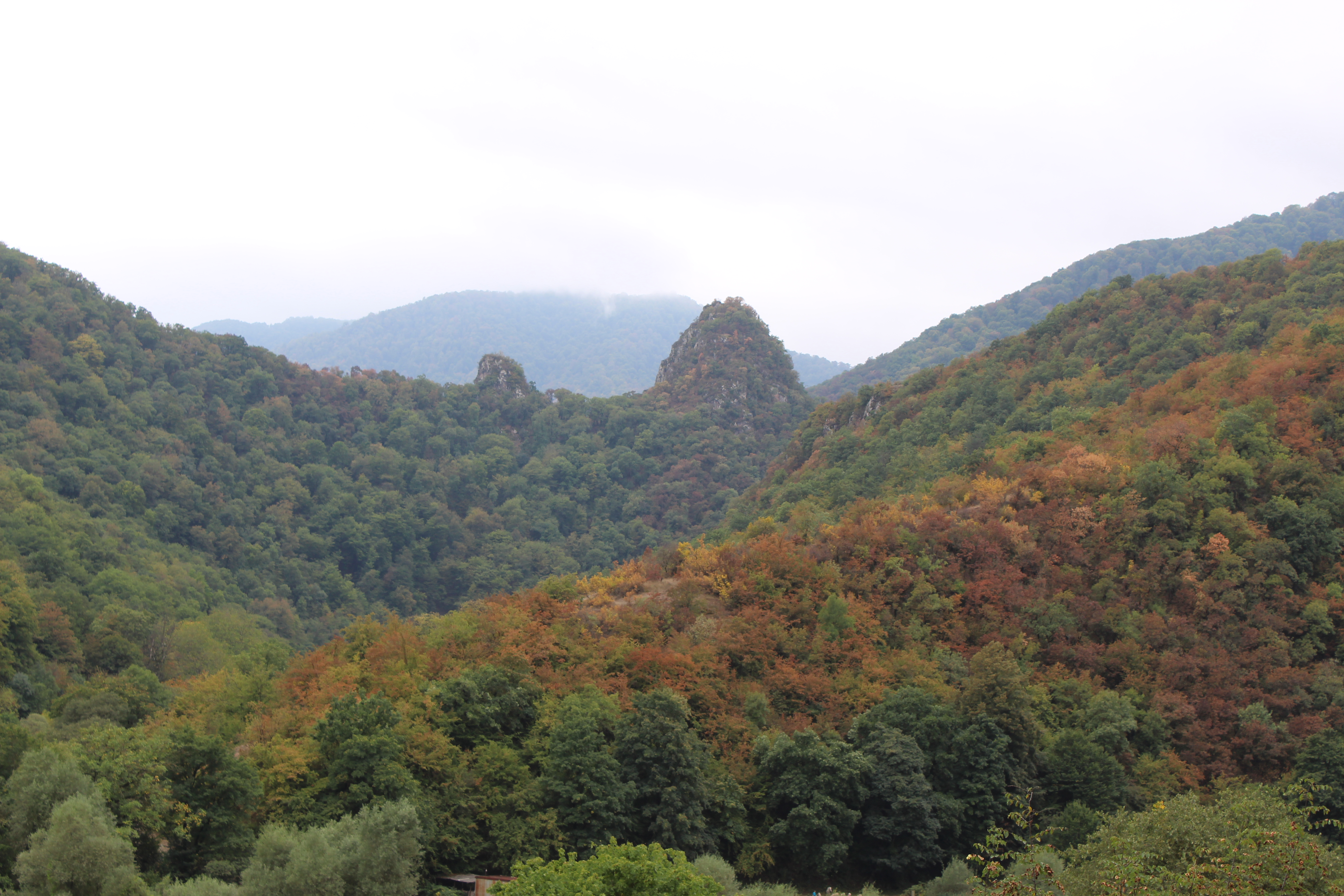
Scenery around Aghjkaberd

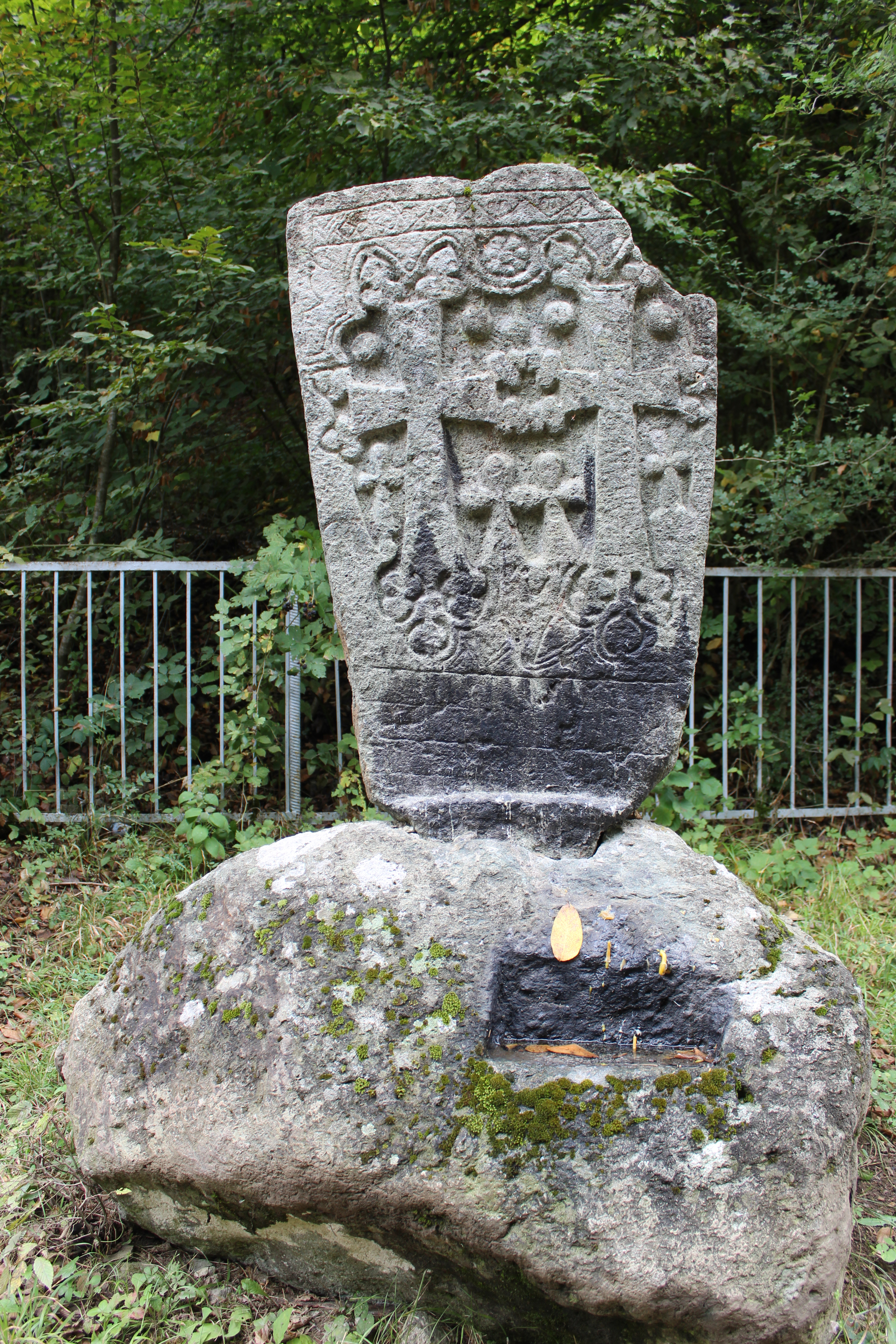
Khachkar memorial dedicated to Andranik

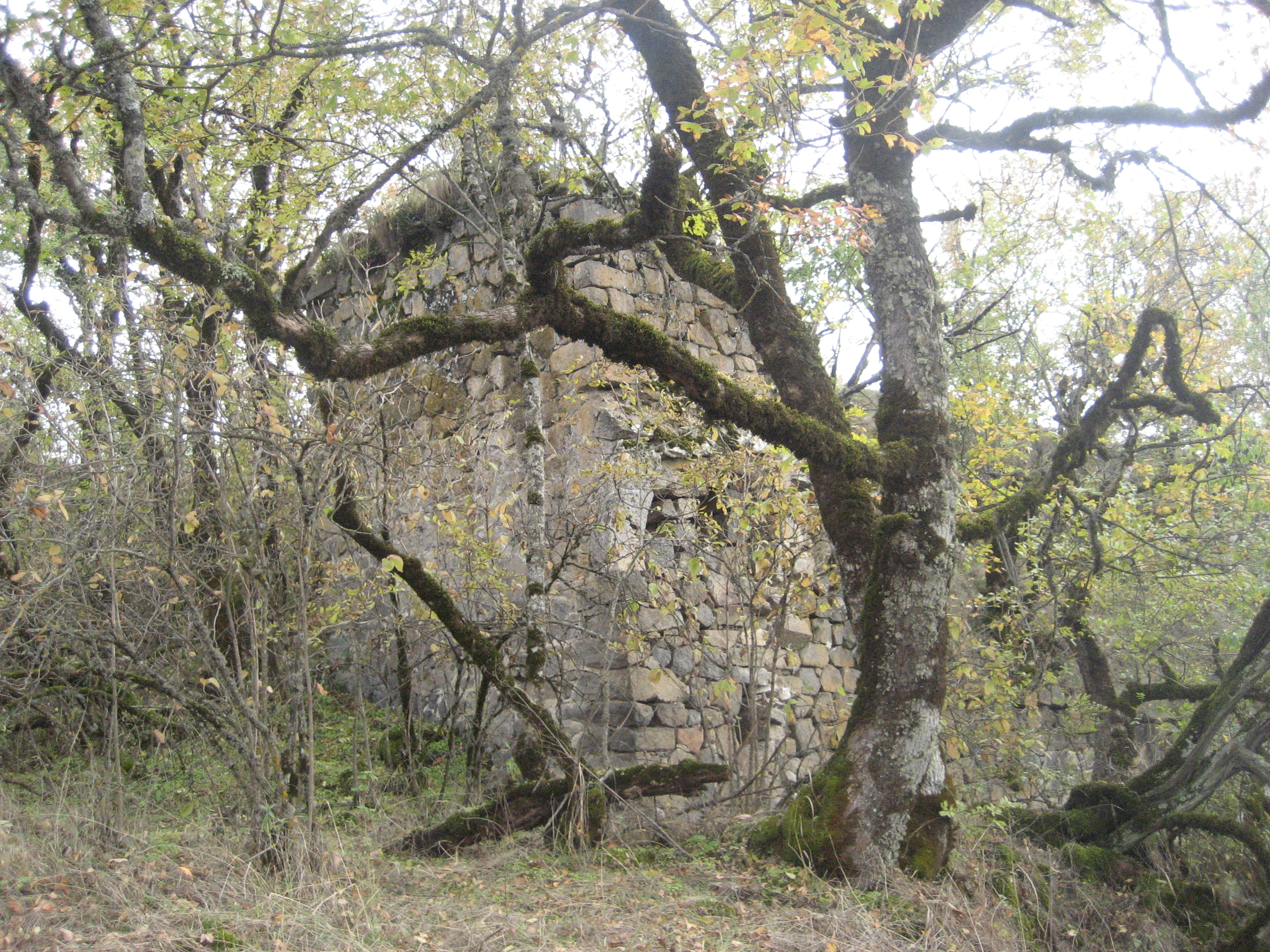
Aghjkaberd

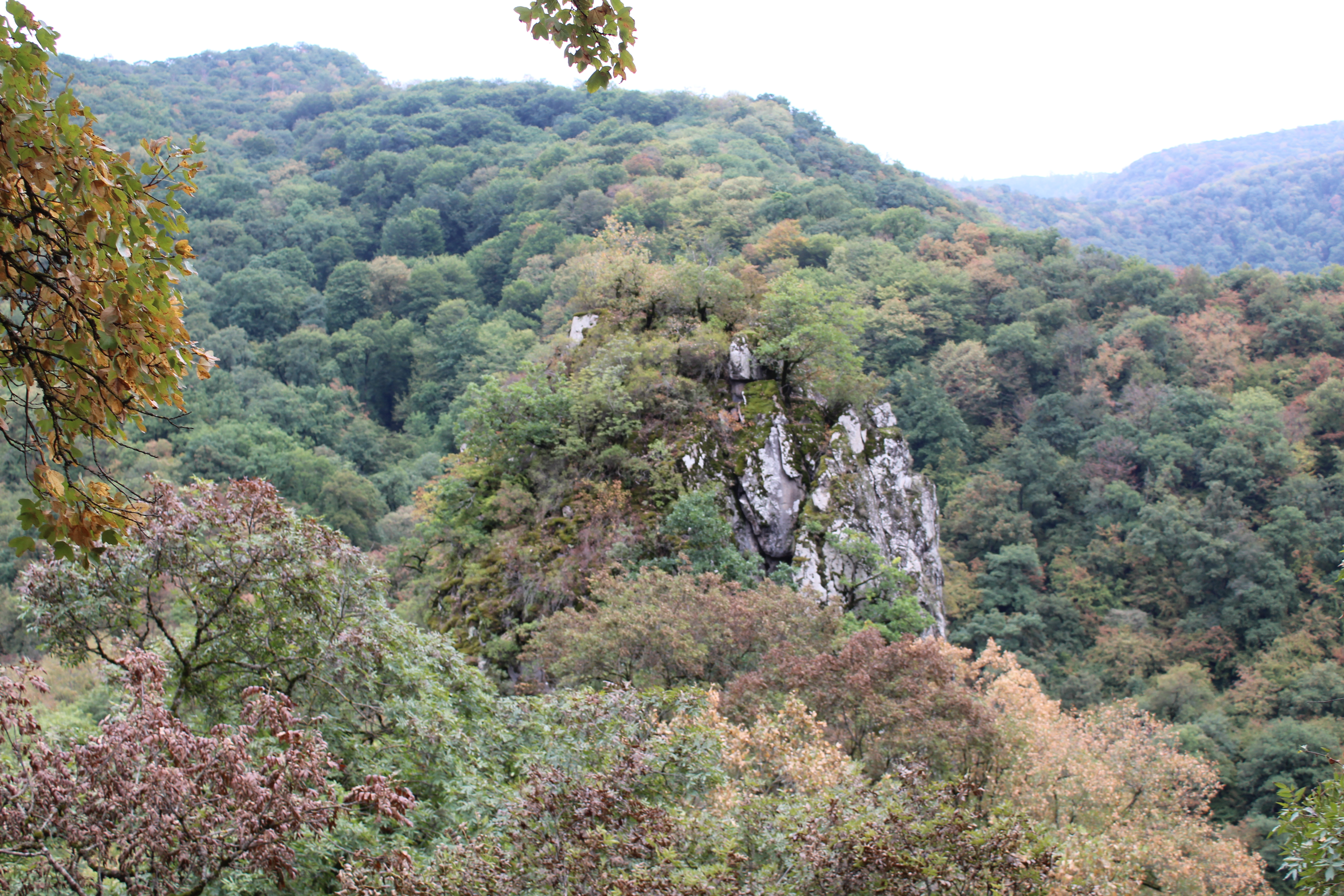
Aghjkaberd

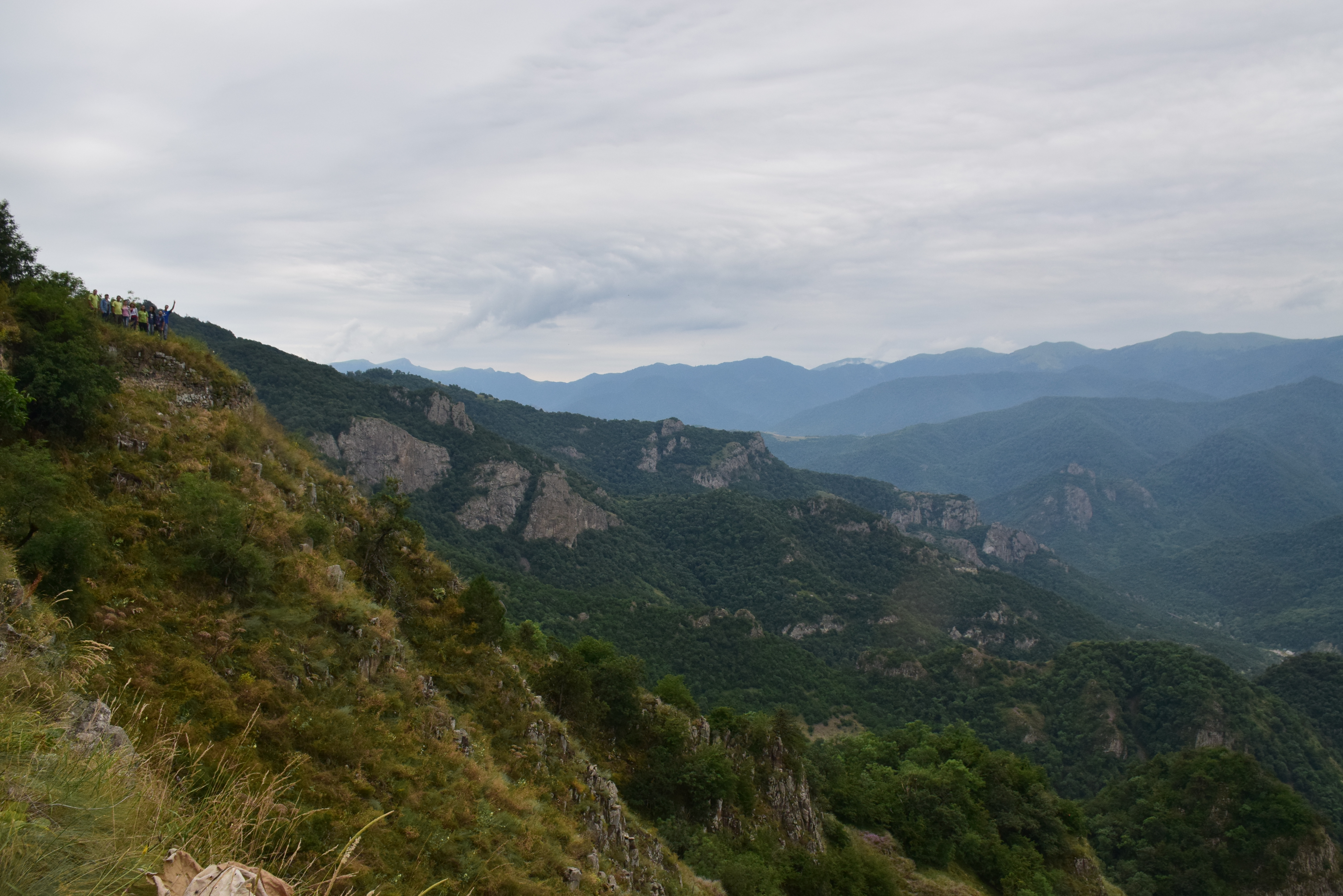
Scenery around Aghjkaberd

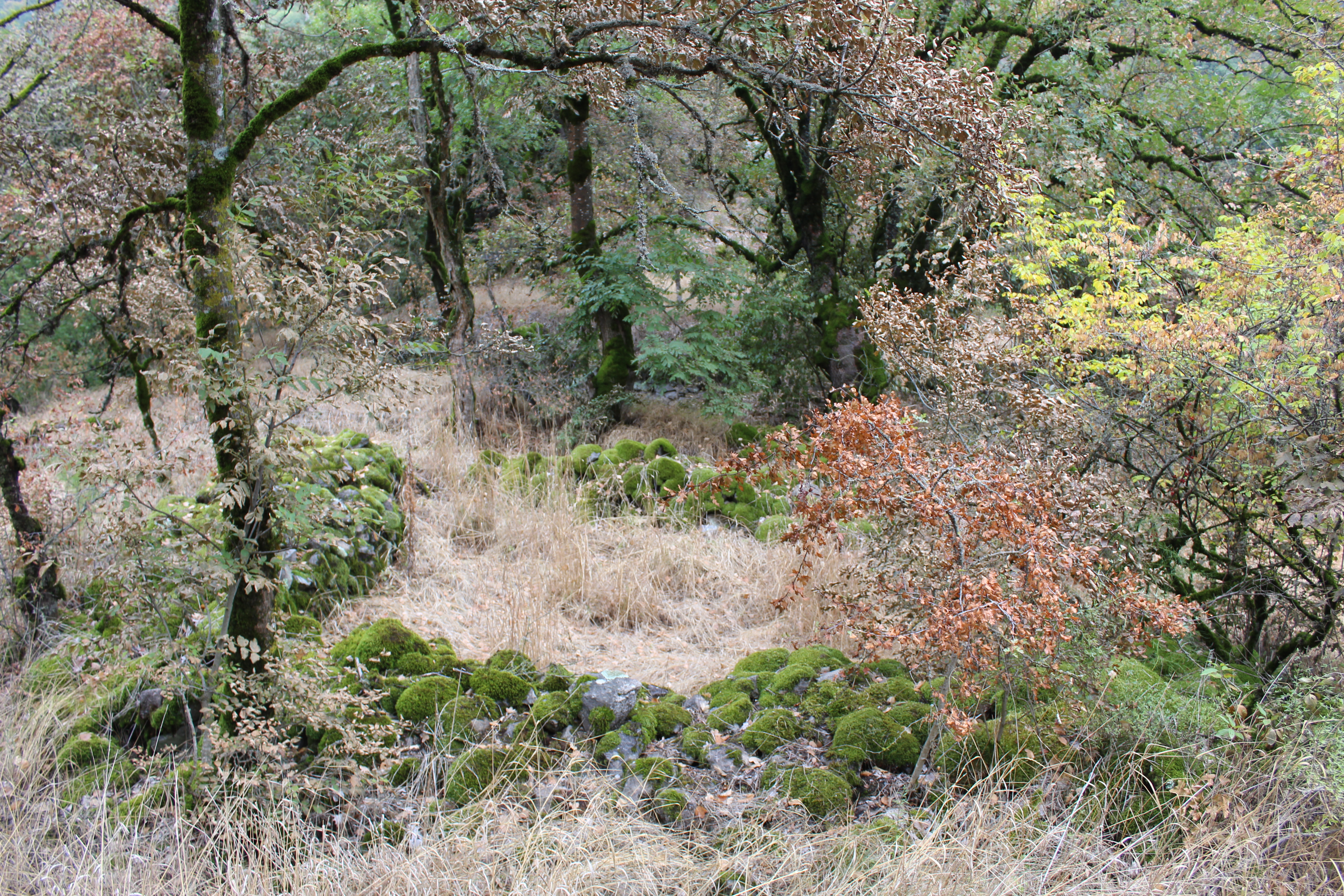
Nature around Aghjkaberd

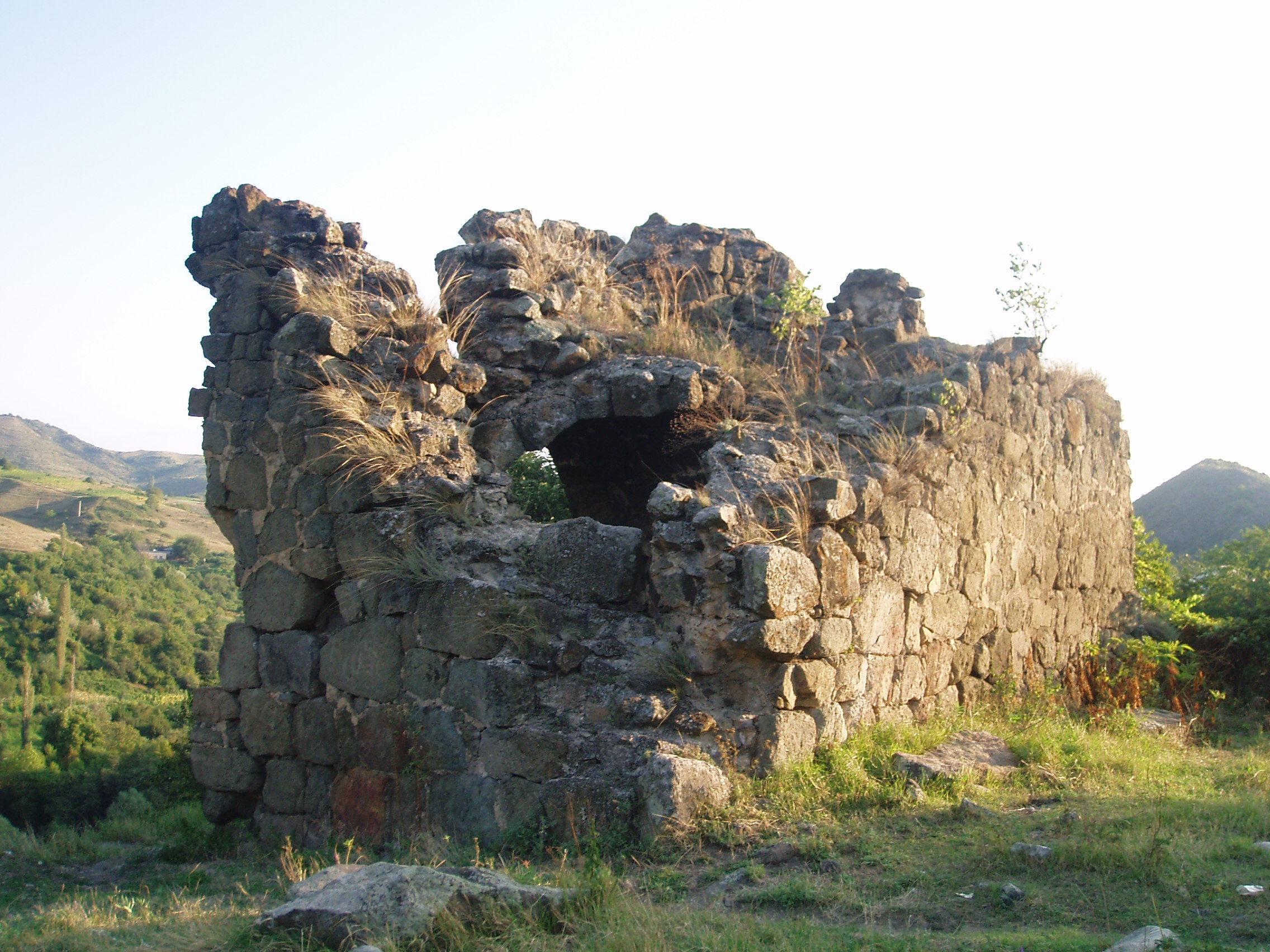
St. Hripsime Church
