= Adolf Abrahamowicz =

Polish playwright (1849–1899)

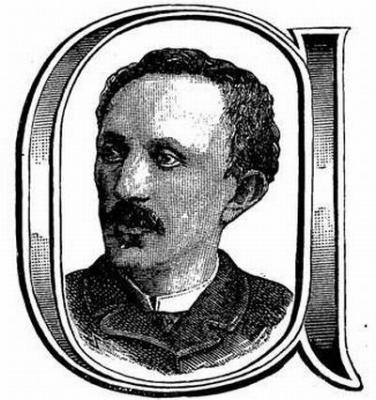

Adolf Abrahamowicz (Armenian: Ադոլֆ Աբրահամովիչ or Ադոլֆ Աբրահամյան; 7 November 1849 – 16 August 1899) was an Austro-Hungarian Armenian writer who wrote in the Polish language. He was a landowner, but lived of his life in Lviv. He worked with many directors and actors, especially with Ryszard Ruszkowski (from 1884-1891). His farce and slapstick was very popular in the Polish entertainment repertoire of the nineteenth century.
