= Stefanowicz =

Stefanowicz is a Polish patronymic surname derived from the given name Stefan . Notable people with the surname include:

- Antoni Stefanowicz
- John Stefanowicz
- Kajetan Stefanowicz
- Magdalena Stefanowicz
- Monika Stefanowicz
- Maurycy Stefanowicz
- Steven Stefanowicz
