= Armenians in Poland =

Ethnic group in Poland

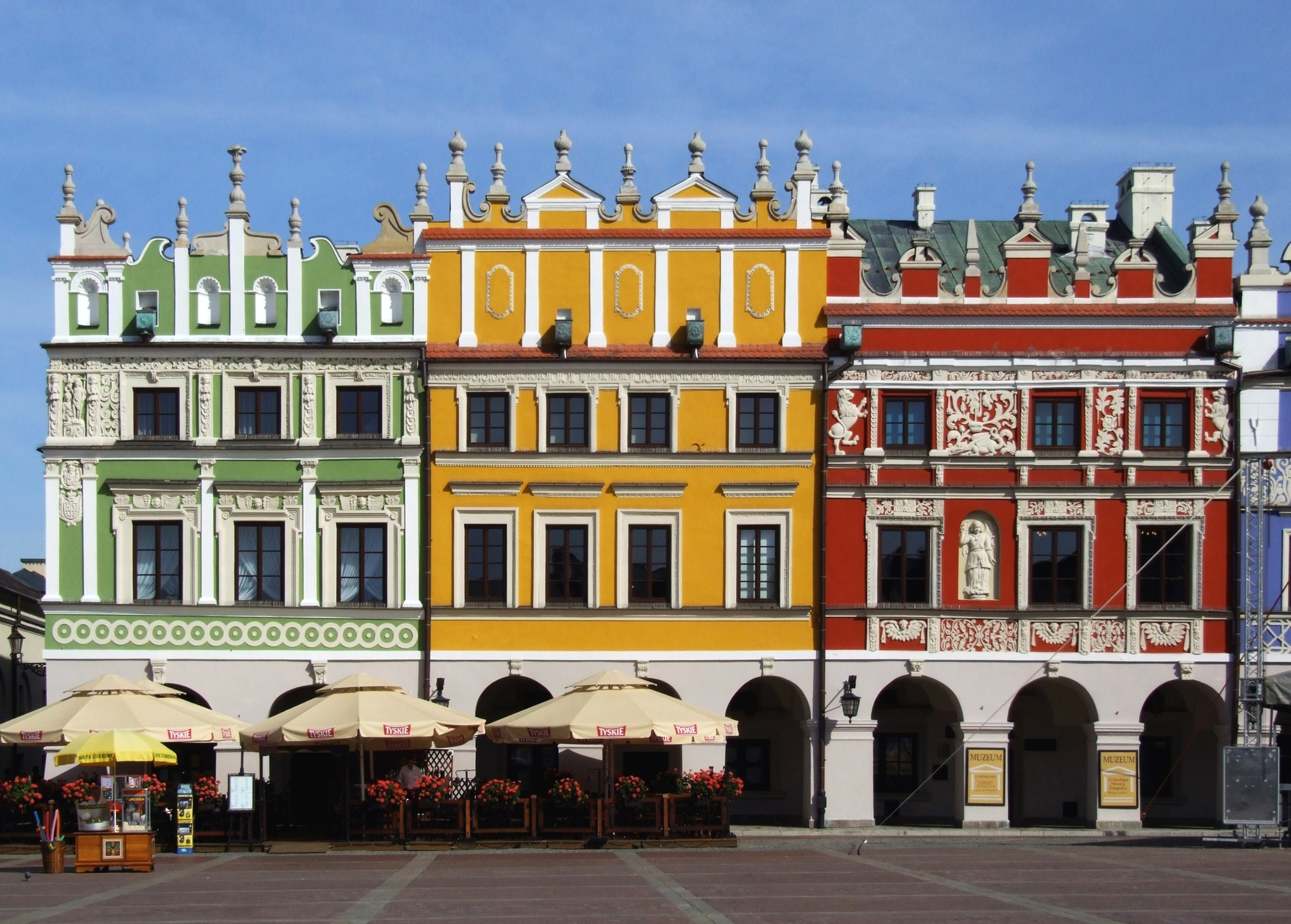
- Mannerist-Baroque "Armenian Tenements" in Zamość

Total population
- 7,000–45,000

Regions with significant populations
- Warsaw and other major population centers

Languages
- Armenian (Both Eastern and Western Dialects), Polish, Russian (Armenians from post-Soviet states)

Religion
- Armenian Apostolic Church, Catholic Church

Related ethnic groups
- Armenians in Slovakia, Armenians in the Czech Republic

Armenians in Poland (Armenian: Հայերը Լեհաստանում, romanized: Hayery Lehastanum; Polish: Ormianie w Polsce) are one of nine legally recognized national minorities in Poland, their historical presence is going back to the Middle Ages. According to the Polish census of 2021 there are 6,772 ethnic Armenians in Poland. They are spread throughout the country, having largely assimilated while preserving a long-standing tradition of settlement.

== History ==
=== Origins ===
The origin of the Armenian presence in the region can be traced back to the late 10th century. Historically back then their settlement did not occur in Poland but in Ruthenia, where they were invited by the Ruthenian rulers of Kyiv and employed as mercenaries. Emigration to Ruthenia intensified first after the Seljuk penetration into Greater Armenia and the fall of Ani in 1064, and later again in the 12th century.

With the rise of the principalities in Western Ruthenia, Prince Davyd Ihorovych invited Armenian settlers to his lands. Others relocated there after the Mongol conquest of Kyiv in 1240. They settled primarily in Galicia and Podolia, including in Kamianets-Podilskyi and surrounding villages, where they had built a church by 1250.

After the wars for Galicia–Volhynia succession in 1340–1392, Ruthenia was partitioned between Poland and Lithuania. And thus majority of the Ruthenian Armenians became subject of the Polish crown. The rest had lived primarily in Volhynia where the third largest Armenian community had thrived in Lutsk. After 1569 Union of Lublin and subsequent transfer of the Ruthenian voivodeships to the Kingdom of Poland, they ended up under Polish rule as well.

=== Late medieval and early modern periods ===
After the conquest of Ruthenia, Casimir III (1333–1370) gave to the Armenians of Kamieniec Podolski in 1344 and those of Lwów in 1356 the right of setting up a national council, exclusively Armenian, known as the "Voit." This council, composed of twelve judges, administered Armenian affairs in full independence. All acts and official deliberations were conducted in the Armenian language and in accordance with the laws of that nation. The Armenians of Lwów had built a wooden church in 1183; in 1363 it was replaced by a stone edifice which became the seat of the Armenian prelates of Poland and Moldavia. Through successive immigrations, the Armenians of Poland gradually formed a colony, comprising up to 6,000 (excluding Kaffa). They were welcomed by the Kings of Poland and were granted not only religious liberty, but also political privileges.

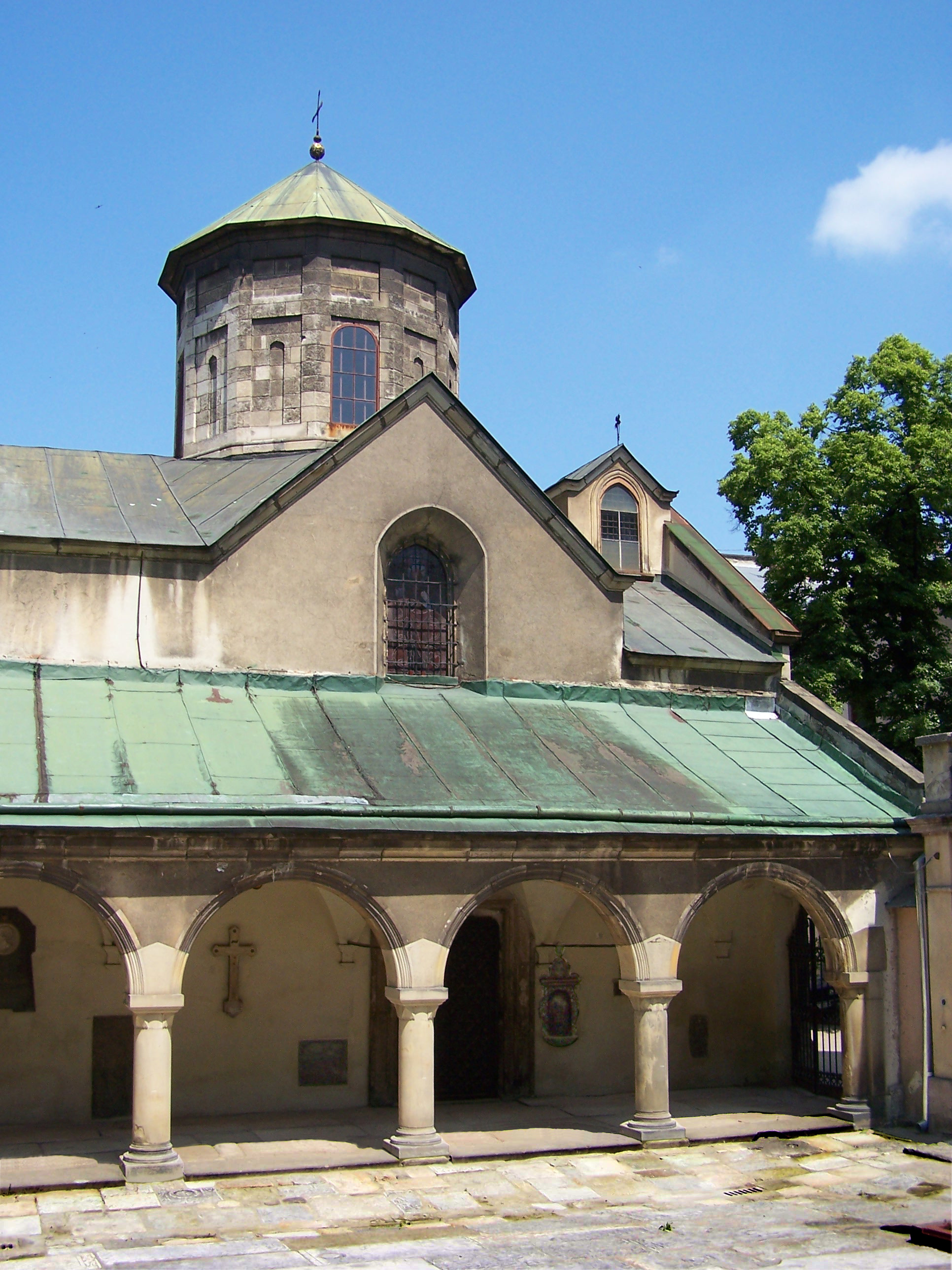
The Armenian Cathedral of Lwów (now Lviv) was for centuries the most important Armenian church in Poland

In the battles of Grunwald and Varna, the forebears of the Alexandrovics, the Augustinovics, the Agopsovics and Apakanovics took part. Also from their ranks came forth later renowned Poles, such as the Malowski, Missasowicz, Piramowicz, Pernatowicz, Jachowicz, Mrozianowski, Grigorowicz, Barowicz, Teodorowicz, among others.

As Kaffa in Crimea voluntarily recognised Polish sovereignty in 1462, with around 46,000 Armenians (66% of the city's population) in the 1470s, it became the largest concentration of Armenians under Polish sovereignty until the Ottoman capture of the city.

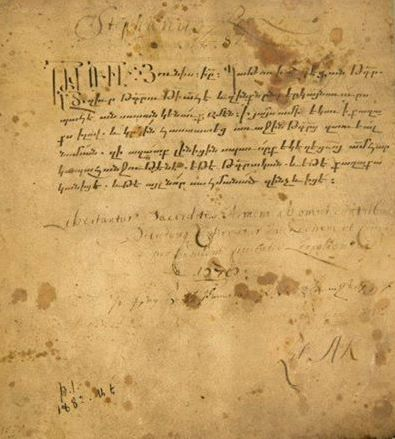
Armenian document written in Lwów, 1578

In 1516 King Sigismund I authorized the installation in the wealthy and aristocratic center of Lwów an Armenian tribunal called the Ermeni tora in Armeno-Kipchak (Datastan in Armenian). The peaceful life of the colony was troubled in 1626. An abbot named Mikołaj Torosowicz was ordained a bishop in 1626 by Melchisedek, a former coadjutor-Katholikos of Etchmiadzin who supported restoring unity with the Roman Catholic Church. Despite the ensuing rift between the majority of the Armenian community and the few followers of Torosowicz the Armenian community finally reentered into communion with the Holy See forming the Armenian Catholic Church which retained a separate hierarchy and used the Armenian Rite.

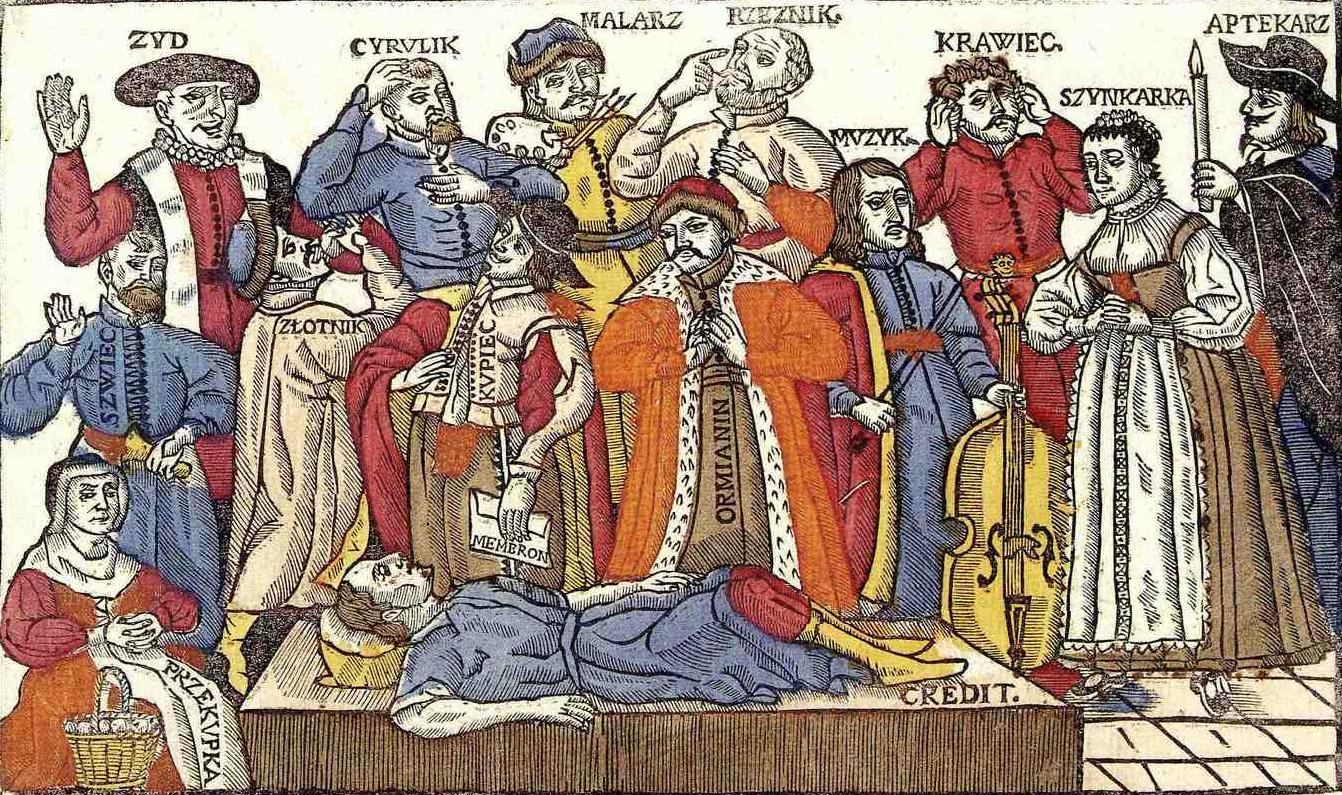
Social strata in the Commonwealth's society in 1655 disputing nations of Polish–Lithuanian Commonwealth with image of Armenian (Ormianin)

Armenians enjoyed better living and earning conditions in Poland, local Armenian self-government, religious tolerance and the opportunity to preserve their own customs. Initially, Armenians settled in royal cities along important trade routes, but later also in private towns, attracted by Polish magnates. Armenians lived mostly in south-eastern Poland, with the largest Armenian communes in the major royal cities of Lwów and Kamieniec Podolski, where they inhabited defined Armenian quarters, and which with several churches served as the main religious centers of Armenians in Poland. Other local Armenian communes were in Brody, Brzeżany, Horodenka, Jazłowiec, Józefgród, Łysiec, Mohylów Podolski, Obertyn, Podhajce, Raszków, Stanisławów, Studzienica, Śniatyn, Tyśmienica, Złoczów and Żwaniec. In addition, there were Armenian churches in Bełz, Buczacz, Jarosław, Kijów, Kubaczówka, Kuty, Lublin, Łuck, Waręż, Włodzimierz, Zamość, Żółkiew, and an Armenian chapel in Warsaw. Armenians were also noted in other towns of south-eastern Poland, such as Przemyśl, Bar, Sokal, Halicz, Dubno. Since the 16th century, Armenian churches in Poland were erected not in the Armenian style, but rather in line with the prevailing Polish trends, such as Renaissance (e.g. in Jazłowiec) and Baroque (e.g. in Brzeżany and Stanisławów). Some Armenians moved to other parts of the Polish–Lithuanian Commonwealth, e.g. Kraków, Warsaw, Gdańsk, Płock, Piotrków and Vilnius. In 1655–1675, the Armenian community in Poland further grew due to immigration from Van, Constantinople and Isfahan.

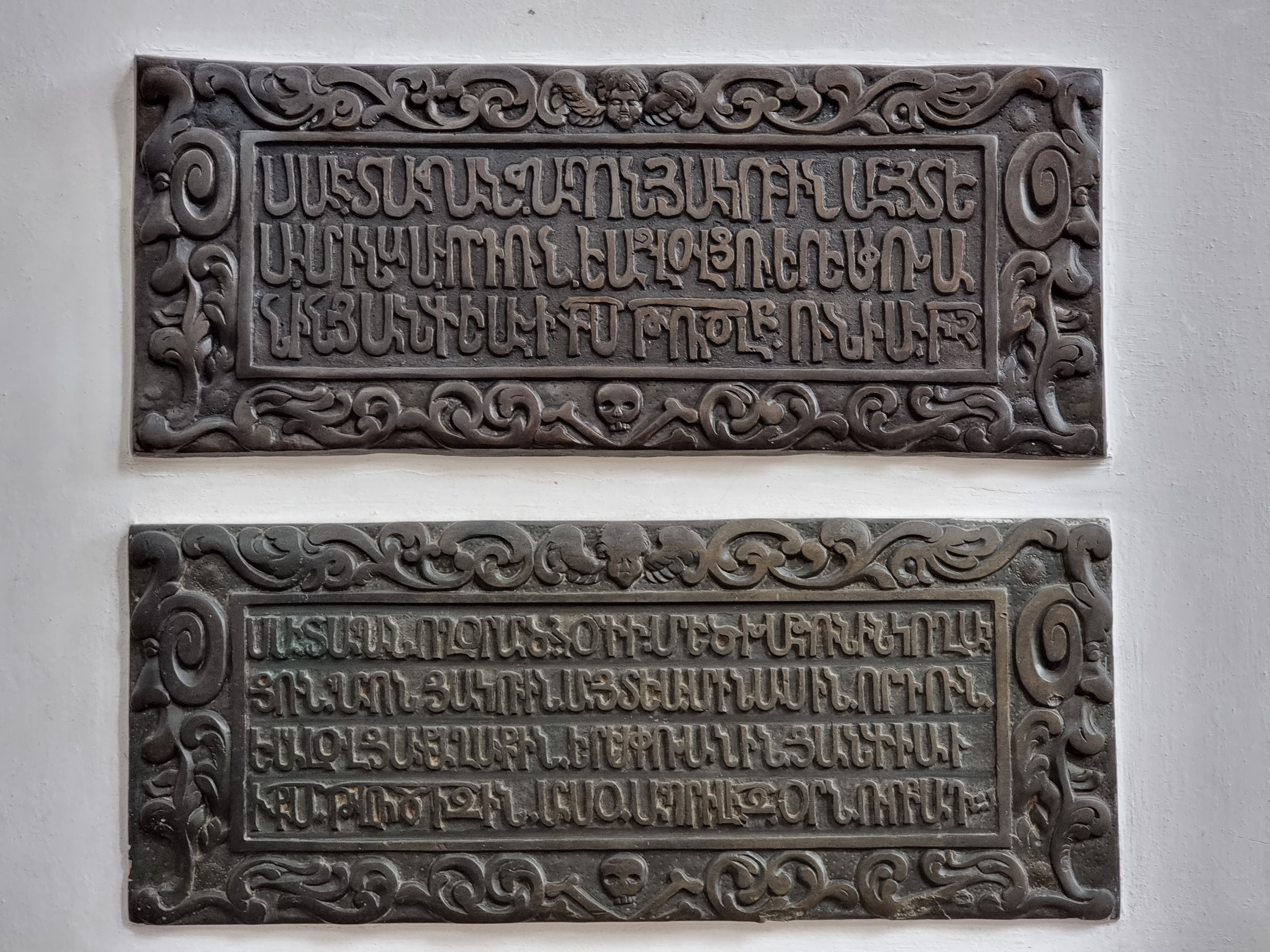
17th-century Armenian epitaphs in the St. Hyacinth's Church, Warsaw

In 1660, the Armenians of Kijów were expelled by the Russian occupiers. In 1674, Armenians of Kamieniec Podolski were expelled by the Ottoman occupiers, and after around three years of exile in the Balkans, they returned to Poland and mostly settled in Lwów, Stanisławów, Brody, Łysiec, Tyśmienica and Złoczów, but some settled in western and central Poland. The Armenian community of Warsaw gained importance and grew since 1672, when many Armenians fled there from Ottoman-occupied Podolia. After Poland regained control of Podolia, Armenians once again settled in various towns in the region, including Józefgród, Mohylów Podolski, Obertyn, Raszków and Satanów. A group of Polish Armenians took part in the Syunik rebellion against Ottoman rule in Armenia in the 1720s.

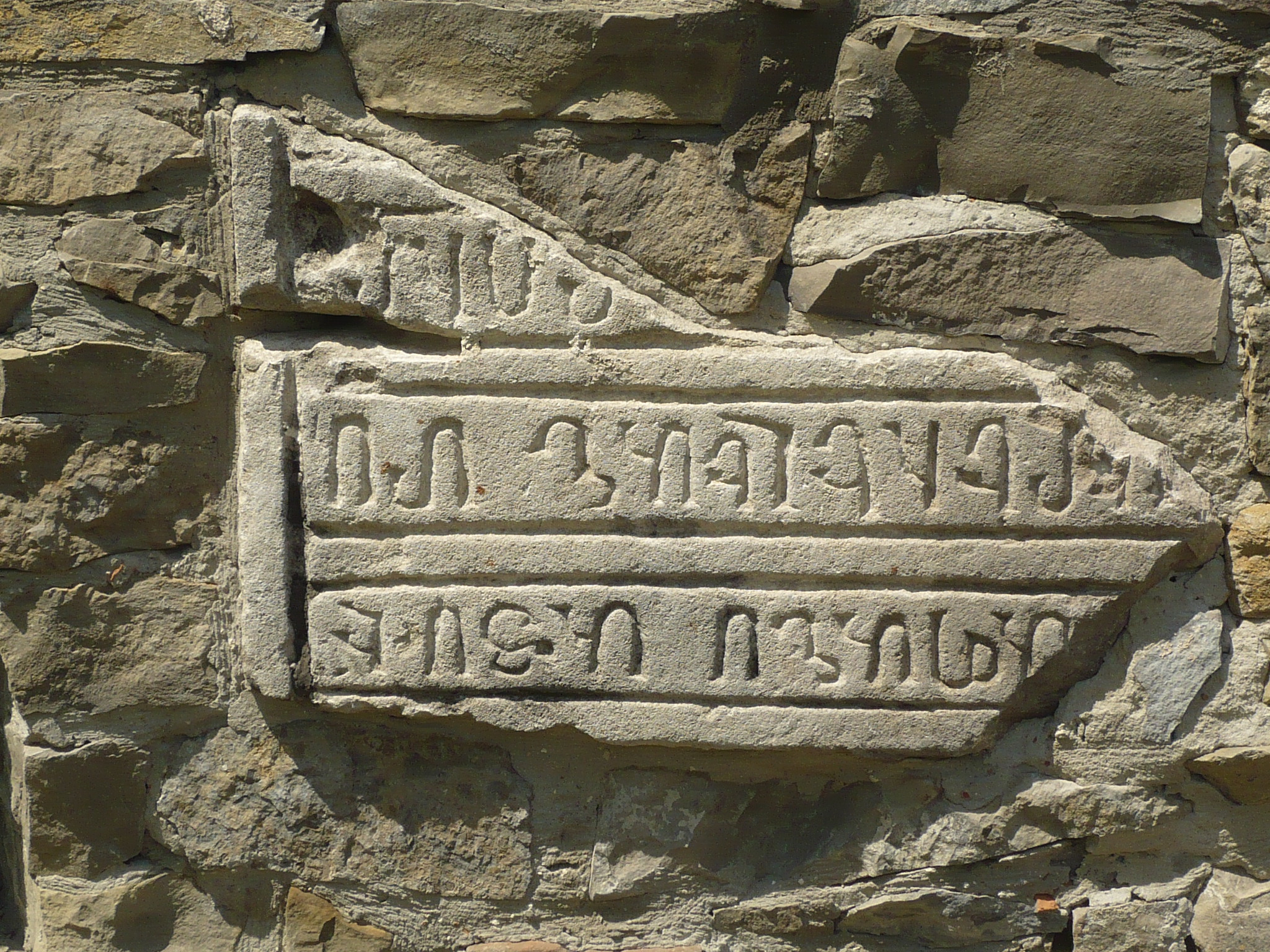
Armenian-language tablet at the 18th-century Armenian church of Żwaniec

The Armenians played an important role in shaping Poland's economic and cultural landscape, leaving a lasting impact through their contributions:

"They were mainly occupied with trade and craft. In the 16th and 17th centuries, Armenians introduced Orient onto the Polish market, importing from the East a variety of oriental luxury goods, and producing their own from oriental designs for the nobility and patricians. Although they were an affluent community, some restrictions were imposed on them, since members of the Armenian Apostolic Church were regarded as heretics in the Polish society. However, in 1630 they entered a union with the Roman-Catholic Church and became Catholics of the Armenian Liturgy. This advanced their assimilation processes"

The Armenians grew wealthy from trade, specializing in importing a wide variety of goods from eastern markets, i.e. Moldavia, Wallachia, Turkey, Egypt, Persia, India and Muscovy to Polish trade centers, such as Kraków, Gdańsk, Lublin, Poznań, Jarosław, Toruń and Vilnius. Armenians were also often translators, secretaries and diplomats of Poland to more eastern countries, sometimes even Polish intelligence agents in Turkic and Tatar countries, and counterintelligence agents in Poland. The first known Armenian to serve in Polish diplomacy was an interpreter of the first Polish mission to the Ottoman Empire in 1415. Sefer Muratowicz, Polish diplomat of Armenian descent, contributed to the establishment of Iran–Poland relations. Armenians also mediated ransoms or ransomed Polish captives from Turkish and Tatar slavery themselves. Some Armenians from Poland even served in the diplomacy of other countries, i.e. Sweden, Wallachia and Austria.

=== Ties to the Armenian community in the Romanian lands ===
Armenians in Moldavia were under the jurisdiction of the Armenian Diocese of L'viv since 1365, shortly after the principality was founded. As merchants, the Armenians mere present in many of the important commercial centers in the various polities which now make up Romania and Moldova. The oldest architectural monument built by Armenians on these lands and preserved to this day is the church of St. Mary of Botosani, built in 1350. Nicolae Șuțu writes in Notion statistiques sur la Moldavie (published in Iași, 1849): "From the 11th century, the Armenians, leaving their settlements invaded by the Persians, took refuge in Poland and Moldova. Subsequent emigrations took place in 1342 and 1606. The Armenian churches in Moldavia, the oldest of which is in Botoșani and founded in 1350, while the other is in Iași which dates from 1395." The fact that two Armenian Bibles from Caffa dating to 1351 and 1354 were preserved in this church is a testament to the antiquity and importance of the Armenian colony in Botoșani. During the short-lived persecution of the Armenian community under the reign of Moldavian Hospodar Ștefan VI Rareș, many Armenians fled across the border into Poland.

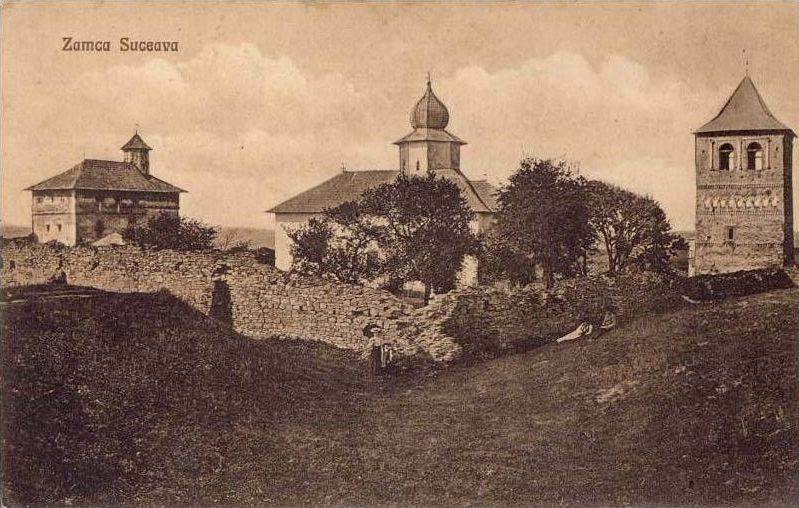
The Armenian monastery of Suceava colloquially known as the Zamca was the base of operations for James Louis Sobieski's failed bid to become the Prince of Moldavia.

Around 10,000 of the Lwów Armenian community who had settled in Moldavia moved from there during the Turko-Polish war in 1671 to Bucovina and Transylvania. In Bucovina, they lived in the city of Suceava and its vicinity. In Transylvania they founded two new cities, Erszebetvaros (Dumbrăveni) and Szamos-ujvar (Gherla), which, as a special favor, were declared free cities by Charles VI, Emperor of Austria (1711–1740).

When James Louis Sobieski attempted to ascend to the Moldavian throne, his base of operations was the 15th century Armenian monastery of Suceava. Beginning in 1690, the Monastery became the headquarters of the Polish Army for all of their operations in Moldova related to Poland's participation in the War of the Holy League against the Ottoman Empire. Staying at the monastery for several years, the Poles built an extensive network of bastion fortifications which are well preserved to this day. The popular name of the monastery, "Zamca" likely comes from this period and is derived from zamek, the Polish word for castle.

=== Late modern period ===
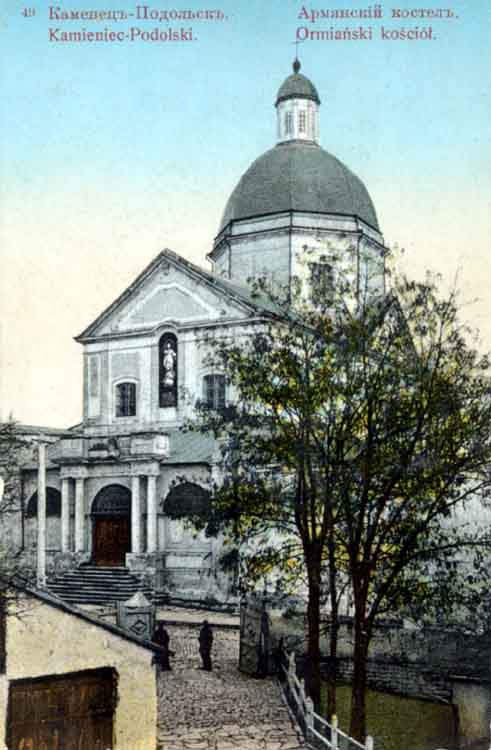
Armenian Catholic church of Saint Nicholas in Kamieniec Podolski in the late 19th or early 20th century

The Armenian origins of many Polish families can be traced to before World War II, the result of intermarriage. The Armenian cathedral of Lwów, modelled on the Cathedral of Ani, was an important site for religious pilgrimages. The last Armenian Archbishop in Poland, Józef Teodorowicz, as the head of the community, was a member of the Austro-Hungarian Senate, together with Roman Catholic and Greek Catholic colleagues.

Following the late-18th-century Partitions of Poland, most Polish Armenians found themselves in the Austrian Partition. By the end of the 18th century, the Austrian authorities dissolved Armenian church schools for children and the Armenian Collegium in Lwów, with only one Armenian school active until the 1860s in Kuty. The Armenian community of partitioned Poland have maintained contacts mainly only with Armenians from the neighboring regions of Bukovina and Bessarabia, while they very rarely had contact with Armenians of Armenia or with other Armenian diaspora. As most of Podolia fell to the Russian Partition and the Armenians there were cut off by the border from the Armenians in the Austrian Partition and the Armenian Cathedral of Lwów, Mohylów Podolski was designated the seat of a local Armenian Catholic bishop (the only one in what was then Russia). By the 1870s, the Armenian communes in the Russian Partition, such as in Mohylów Podolski, were abolished. The Armenian community of Warsaw further grew in the 19th century, due to immigration of Armenians from the Caucasus and Russia.

Following Polish and Ukrainian national revival in Galicia in 19th century and significant drop of proficiency in Armenian among local Armenians, they became actively assimilated between local Polish and Ukrainian population. Armenian elites primarily sided with Polish cause and eventually started to self-identify as part of Polish nation while retaining aspects of Polish-Armenian culture. On the contrast poorer Armenians tended to fully assimilate between Ukrainians, without retaining any of the prior cultural difference. Polonised Armenian elites took part in Polish uprisings against foreign rule, but siding with Polish national movement became hostile towards Ukrainian national movement and declined to recognise any of Ukrainian national aspirations.

Malyi Virmeny which translates to "Little Armenia" in Ukrainian is a historic old town once near the Smotrych River which was founded during the Polish–Lithuanian Commonwealth.

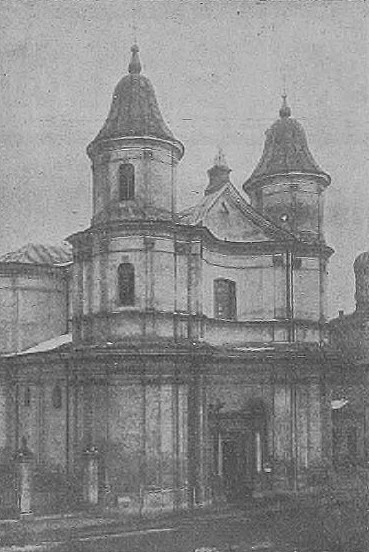
Armenian Catholic church of Stanisławów in the 1930s

At the beginning of the 20th century, there were about 6,000 Armenians living mostly in Eastern Galicia (today Western Ukraine), with centers in Lwów (Lviv), Stanisławów (Ivano-Frankivsk), Brzeżany (Berezhany), Kuty, Łysiec (Lysets), Horodenka, Tłumacz (Tlumach) and Śniatyn (Sniatyn). An Armenian-language faculty was introduced at the University of Lwów in 1904.

During WWI some activists sought to reestablish an independent Armenia or to obtain international protection for Armenians from the Turkish-perpetrated massacres. In 1916, Archbishop Józef Teodorowicz attempted to bring several thousand Armenian survivors of the Armenian genocide to Lwów, but to no avail due to the hostile attitude of the Turkish-allied Austrian occupier. The Armenian community and Poles supported efforts to restore an independent Armenia following World War I. The Polish-Armenian Society was founded by a group of Poles and Armenians in Lwów in 1920, which after the Red Army invasion of Armenia advocated the admission of 40,000 Armenians from the Caucasus and Russia to Poland, which, however, was impossible due to the Soviet occupation.

=== World War II and post-war period ===
During World War II, south-eastern Poland was at various times occupied by the Soviet Union and Nazi Germany, and Polish Armenians were like Poles the victims of both occupiers and Ukrainian nationalists. The Soviets conducted deportations to the USSR and executions of several Armenian Catholic preachers. Dionizy Kajetanowicz, the last diocesan administrator of the Armenian Catholic Archeparchy of Lwów, issued Armenian Catholic baptismal certificates to Jews, saving them from the Holocaust, and was arrested by the German occupiers in 1943. Polish Armenians were also the victims of the massacres of Poles in Volhynia and Eastern Galicia, perpetrated by the Ukrainian nationalists.

After suffering heavy losses along with the rest of Poland's population in the war, the Polish Armenian community suffered a second loss. The regions of Poland where Armenians were concentrated such as Eastern Galicia were annexed into the Soviet Union as part of the agreements reached at the Yalta Conference. As a result, the Polish Armenian community became dispersed all over Poland. Many of them were resettled in cities in northern and western Poland such as Kraków, Gliwice, Opole, Wrocław, Poznań, Gdańsk, and Warsaw.

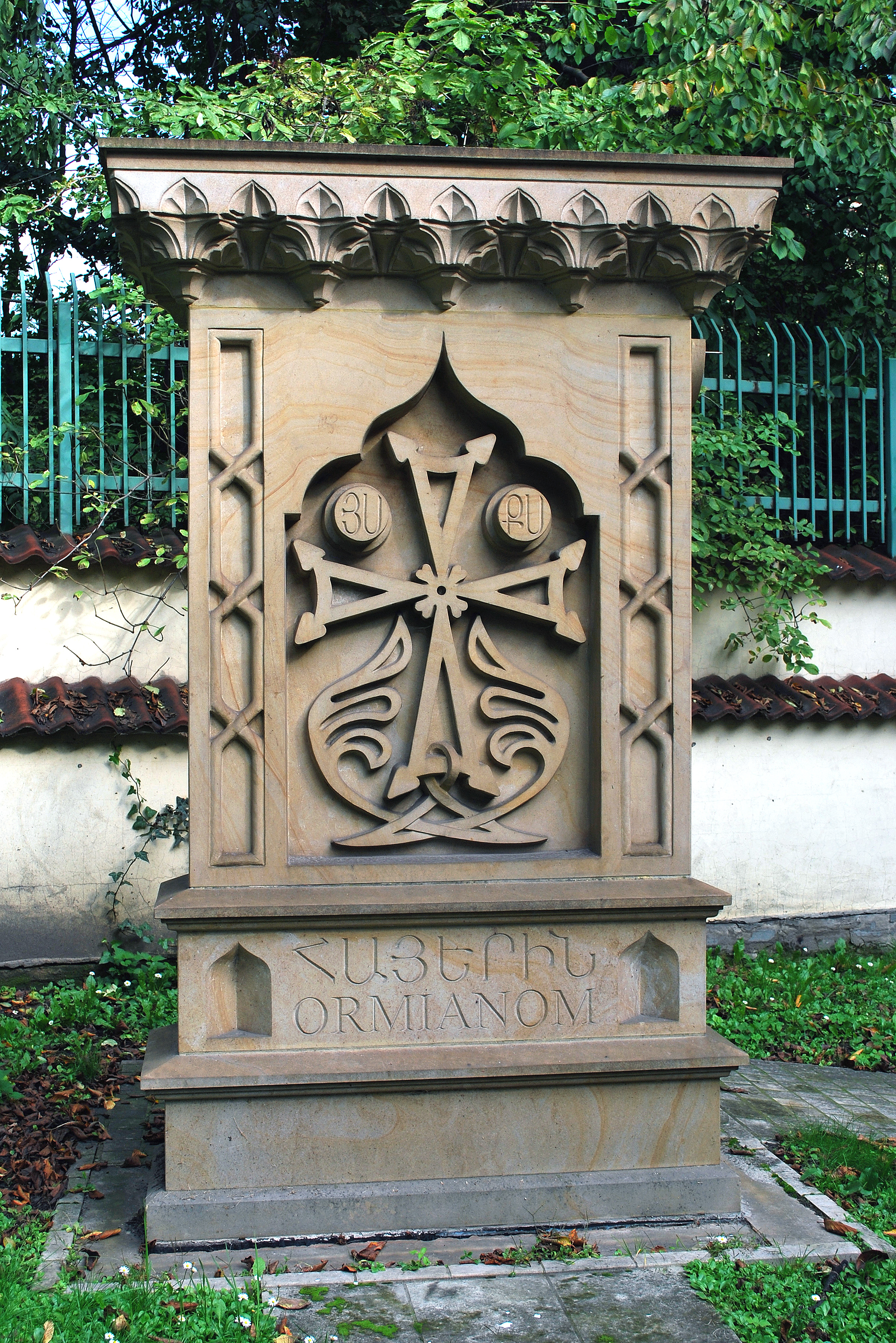
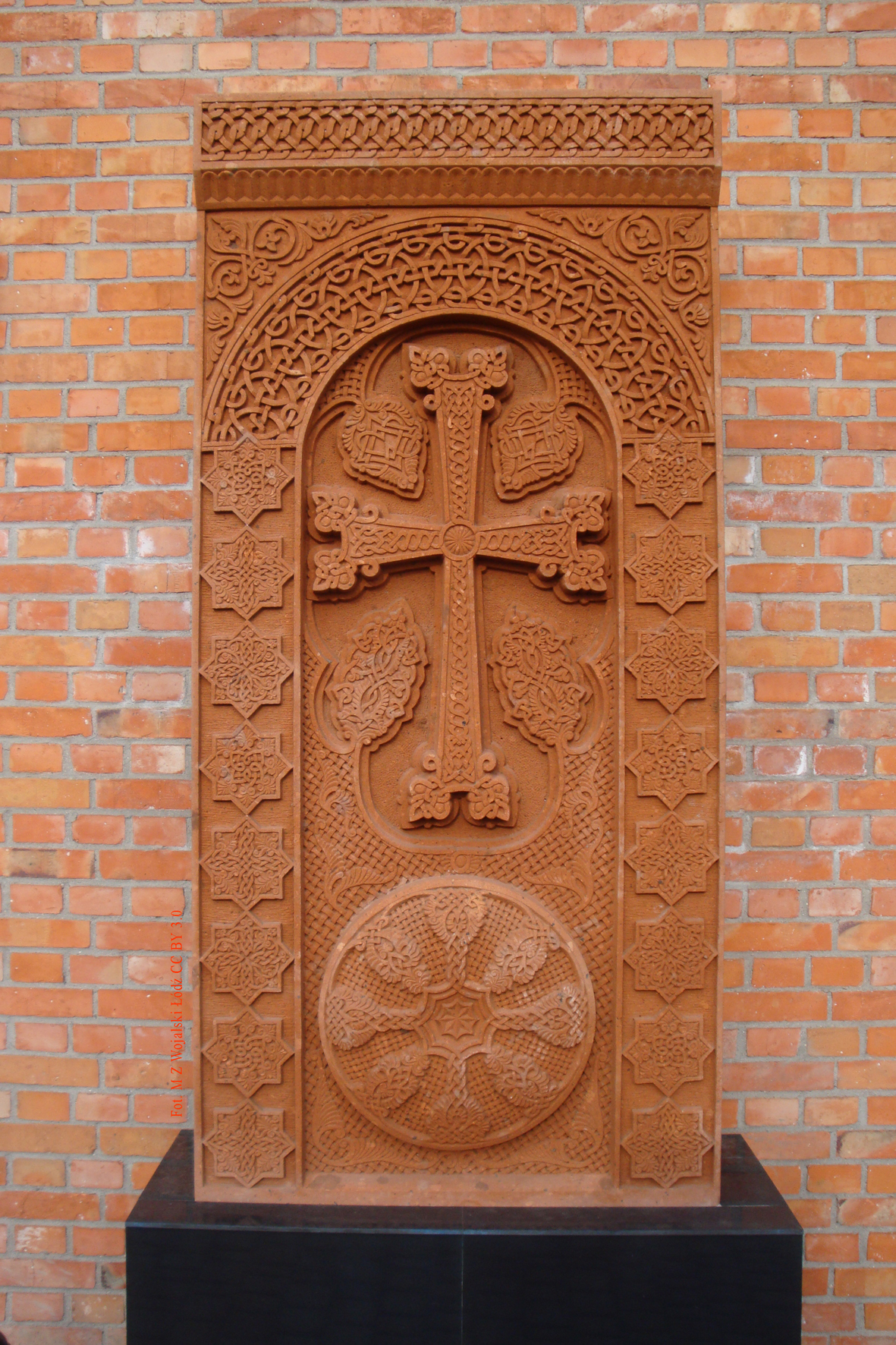
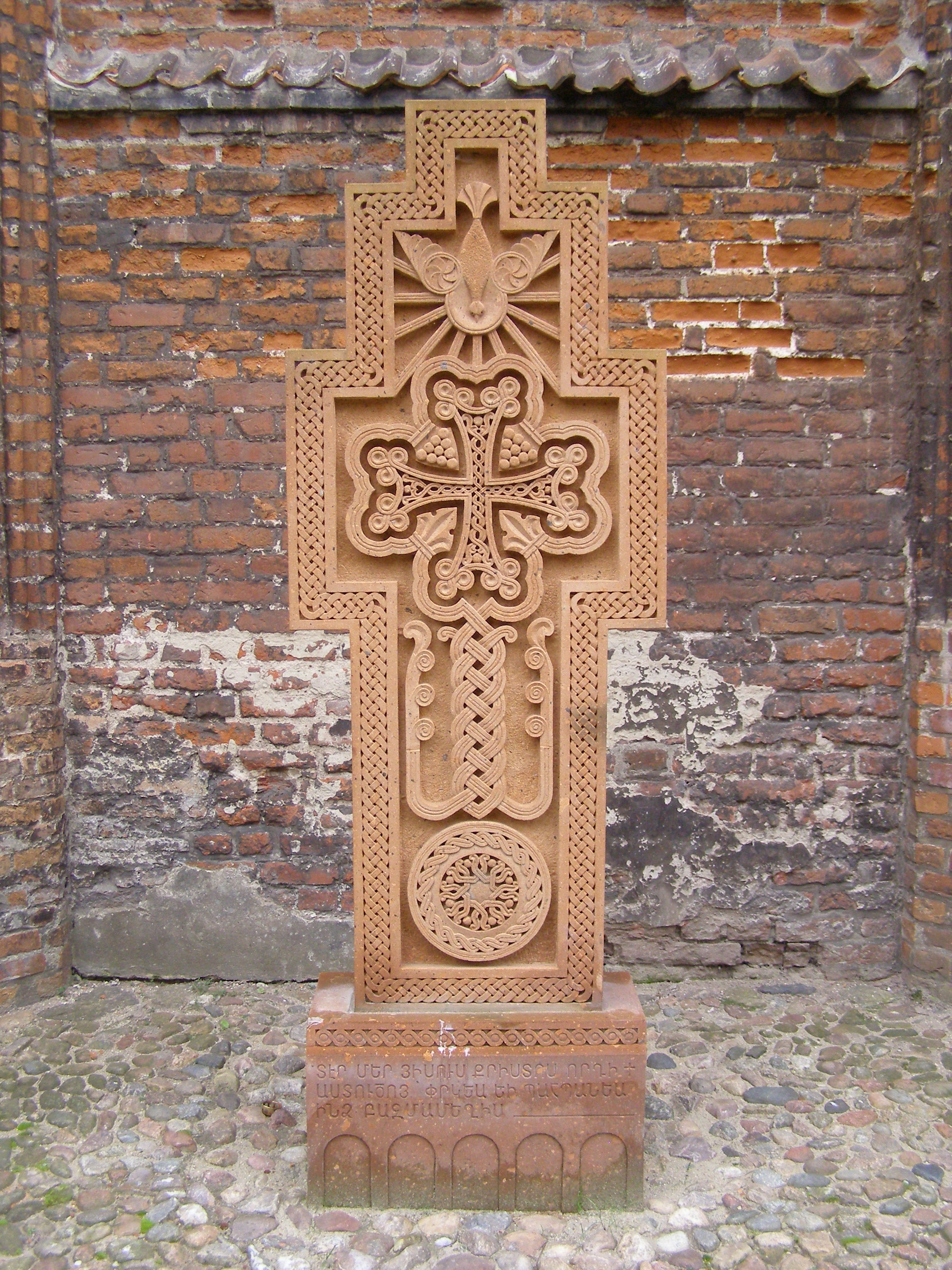
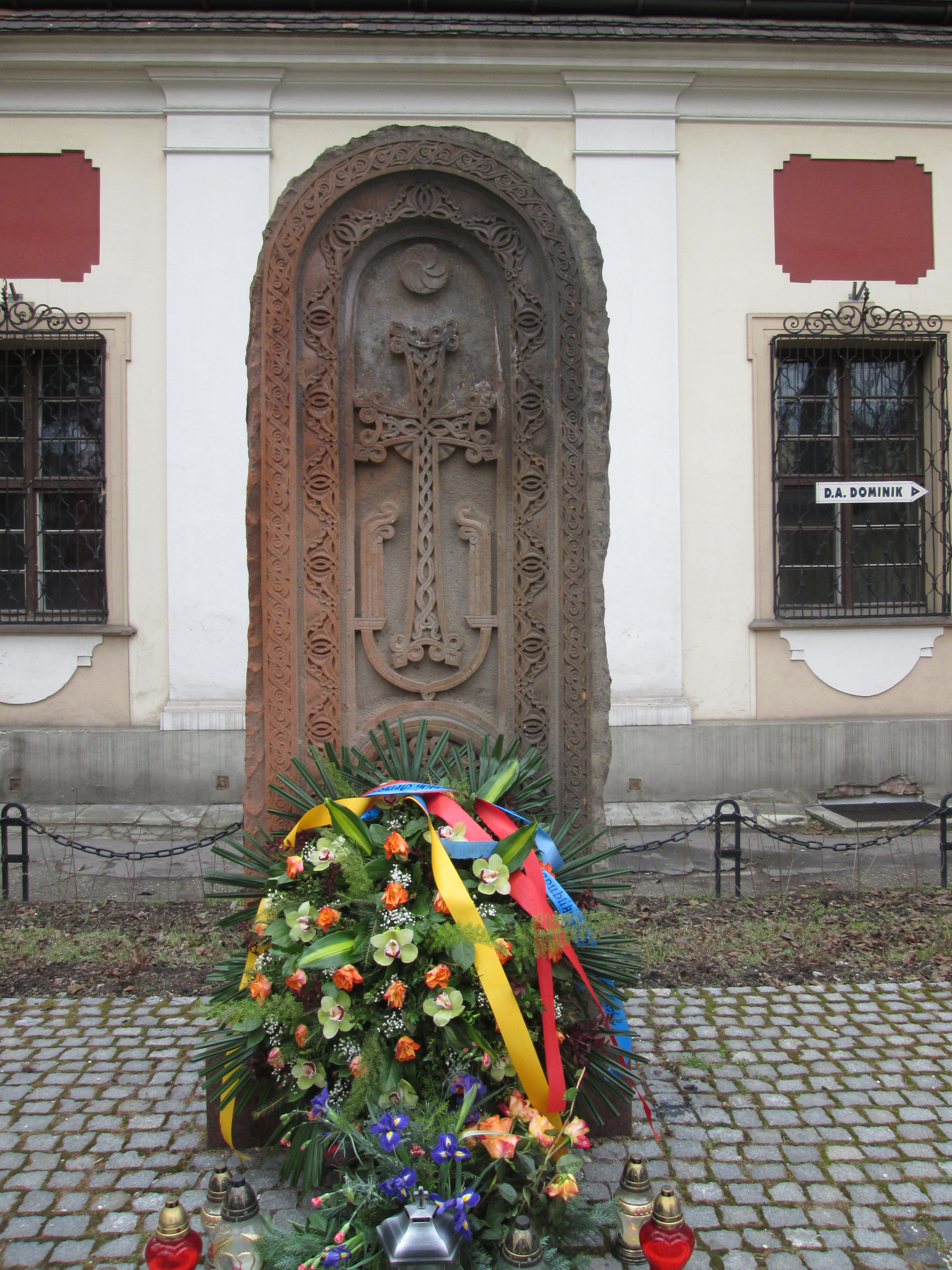
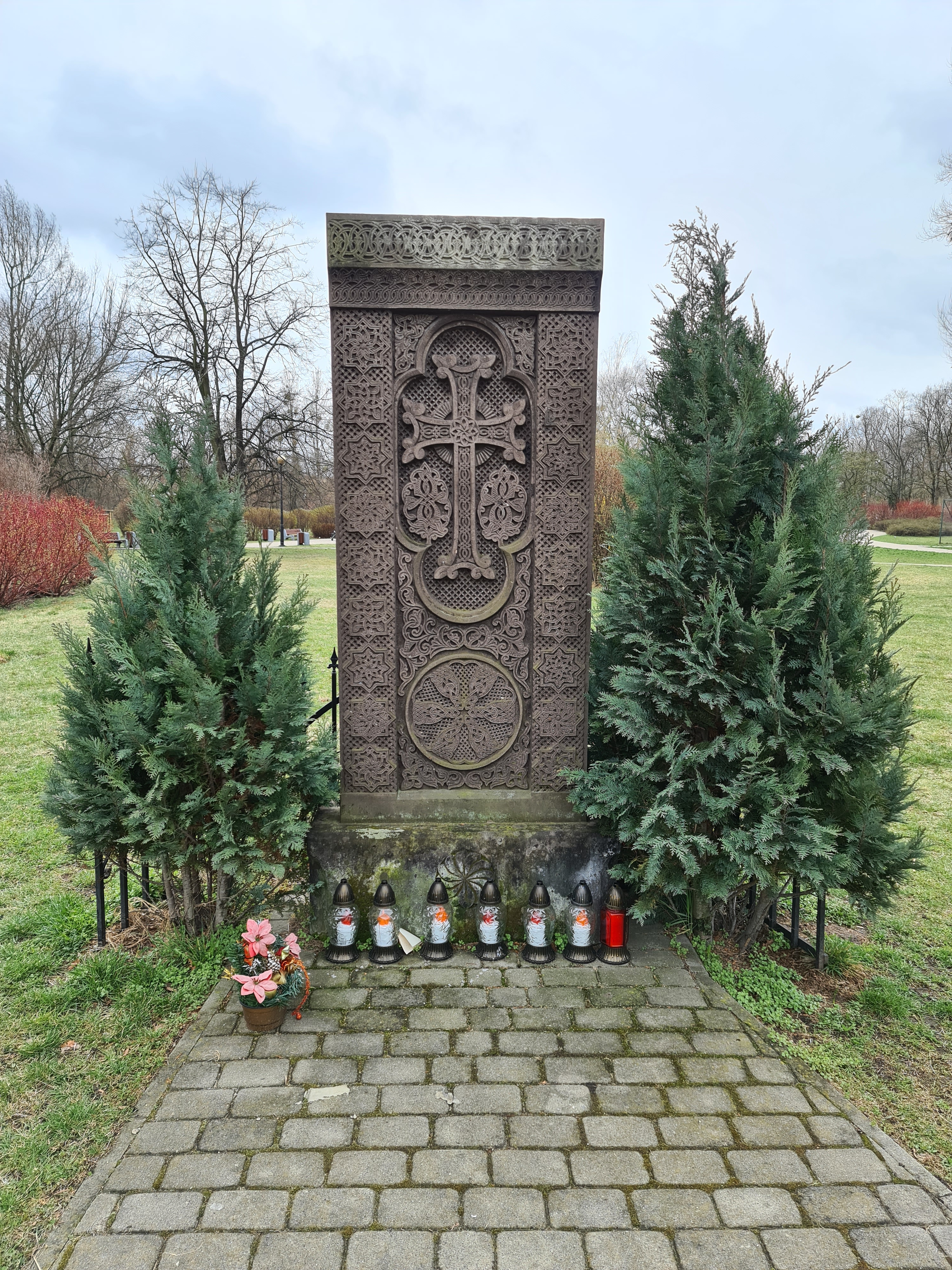
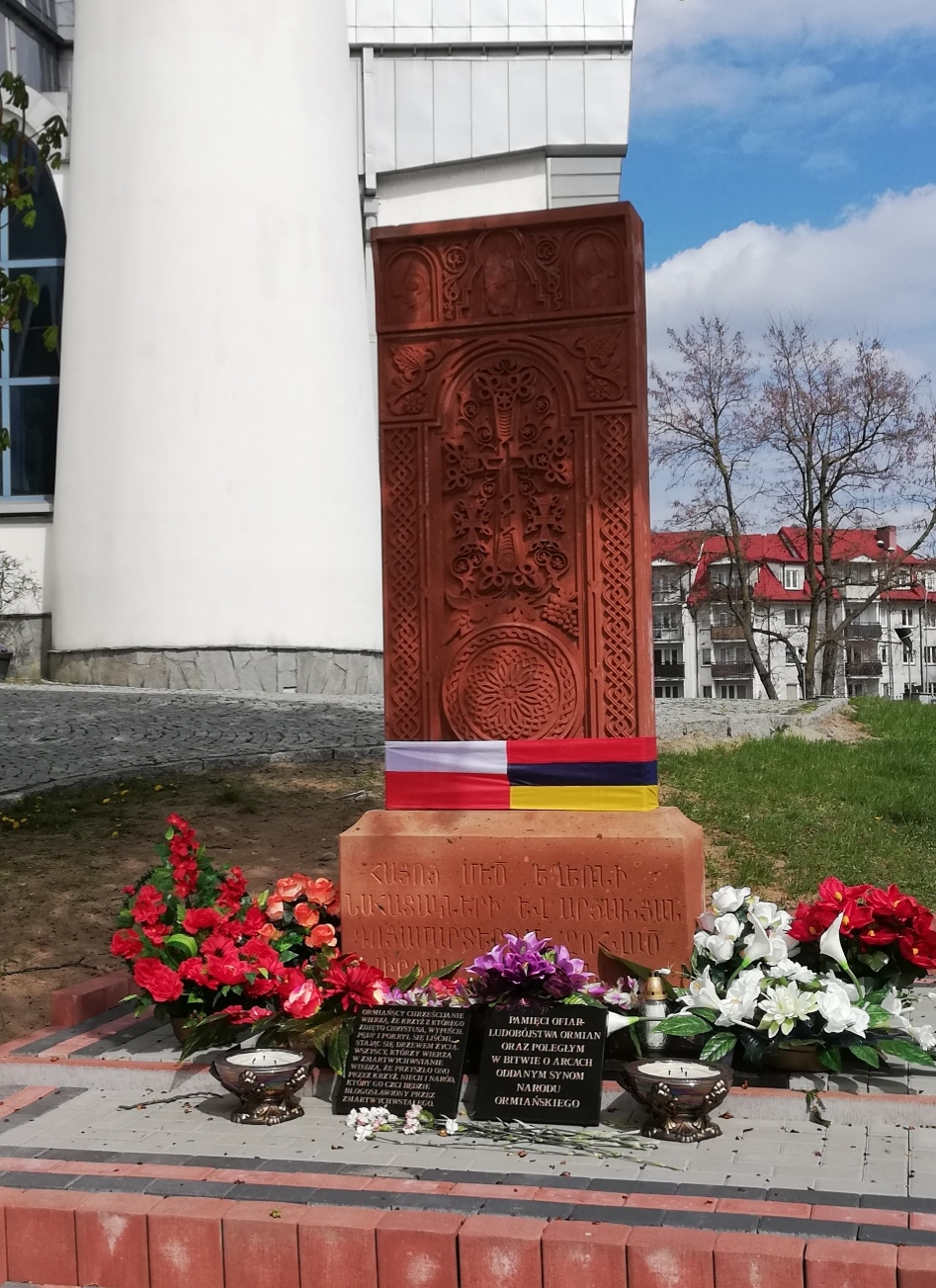
Khachkars in Kraków, Łódź, Gdańsk, Wrocław, Warsaw and Białystok

To combat this dispersion they began to form Armenian Cultural Associations. Additionally, the Catholic Church opened two Armenian Catholic parishes with one in Gdańsk and the other in Gliwice, while Roman Catholic churches in other cities such as St. Giles in Kraków would from time to time also hold Armenian Rite services for the local Armenian community.

Some Polish Armenians as part of the Anders Army ended up as emigrants in Western Europe and later in Australia, the United States and Canada, where they co-founded the Armenian Catholic parish in Montreal in 1983.

A number of cultural and artifacts of Armenian culture can still be found within Poland's present-day borders, particularly in the vicinity of Zamość and Rzeszów.

== Armenians today ==
Most Armenians living in Poland today have origins from the post-Soviet emigration rather than the older Armenian community. After the Soviet Union's collapse, thousands of Armenians came to Poland to look for the opportunity to better their life. It is estimated that between 40,000 and 80,000 Armenians came to Poland in the 1990s, (many of them returned to Armenia or went further West, but up to 10,000 stayed in Poland), with only about 3,000–8,000 from the so-called 'old emigration'.

The Foundation of Culture and Heritage of Polish Armenians was established by the Ordinary of the Armenian-Catholic rite in Poland, Cardinal Józef Glemp, the Primate of Poland, on April 7, 2006 to care for the books, paintings, religious remnants which were saved from perishing when carried away from Armenian churches situated in the Eastern former parts of Poland captured by the Soviets during World War II.

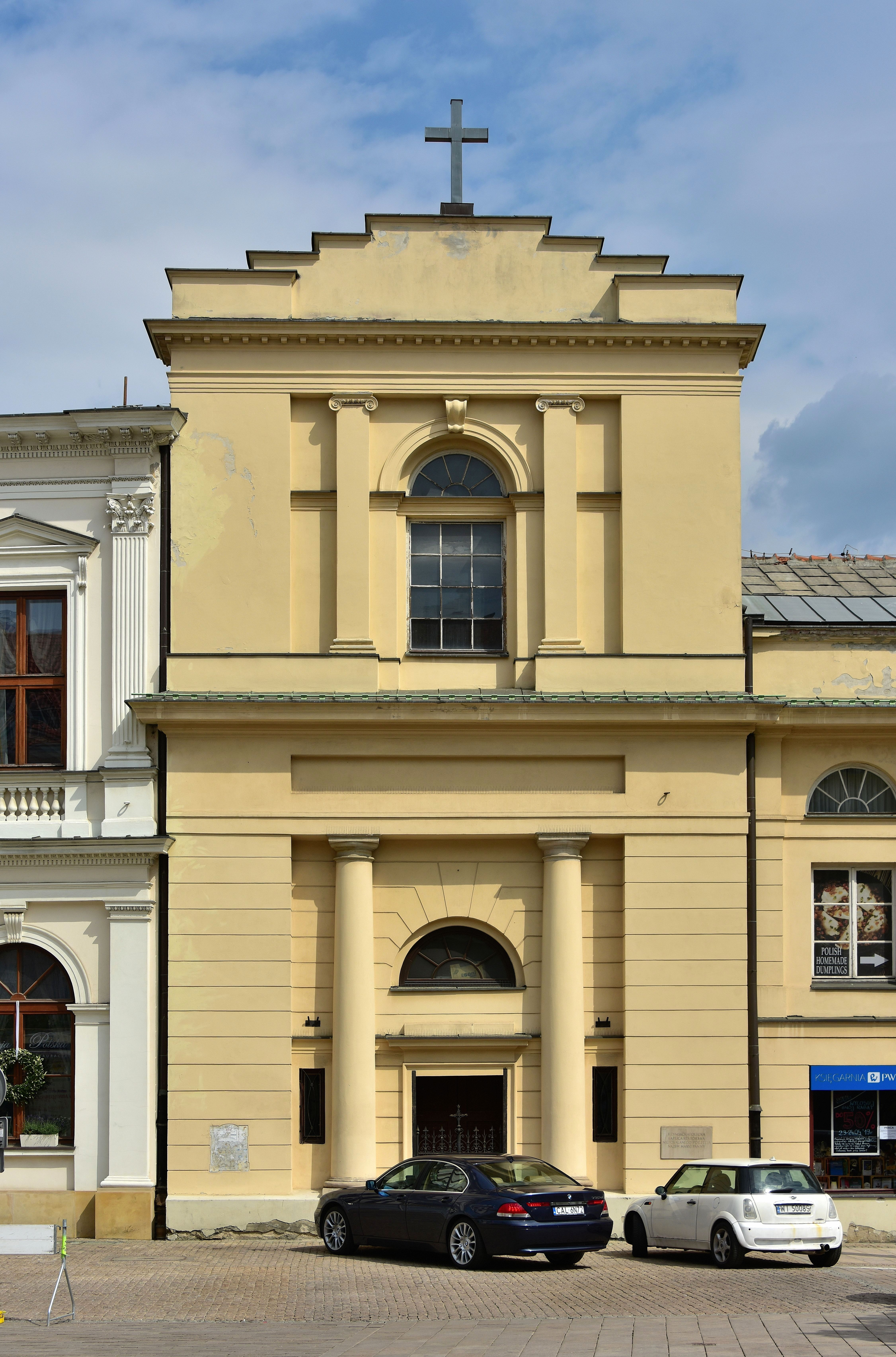
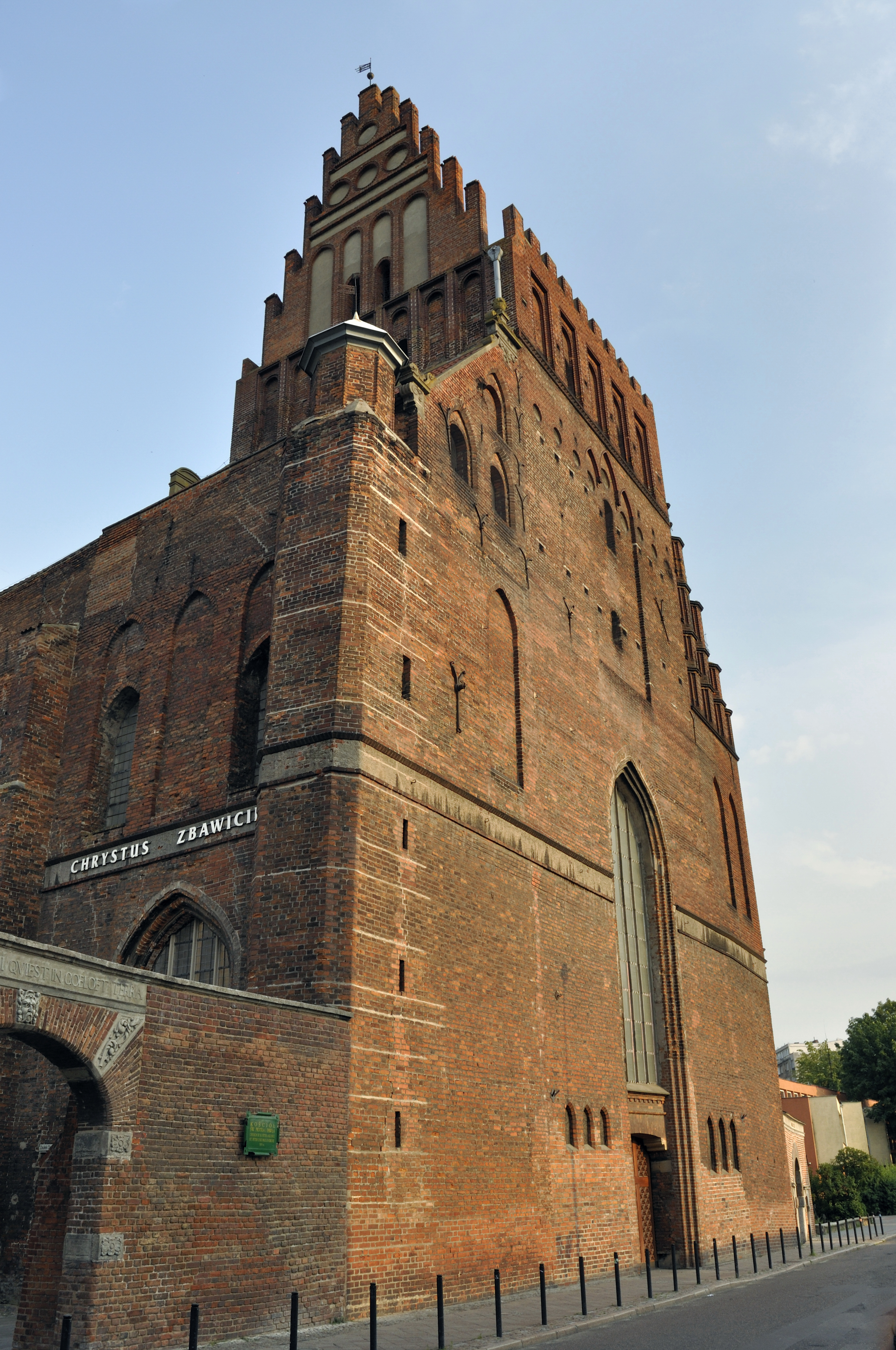
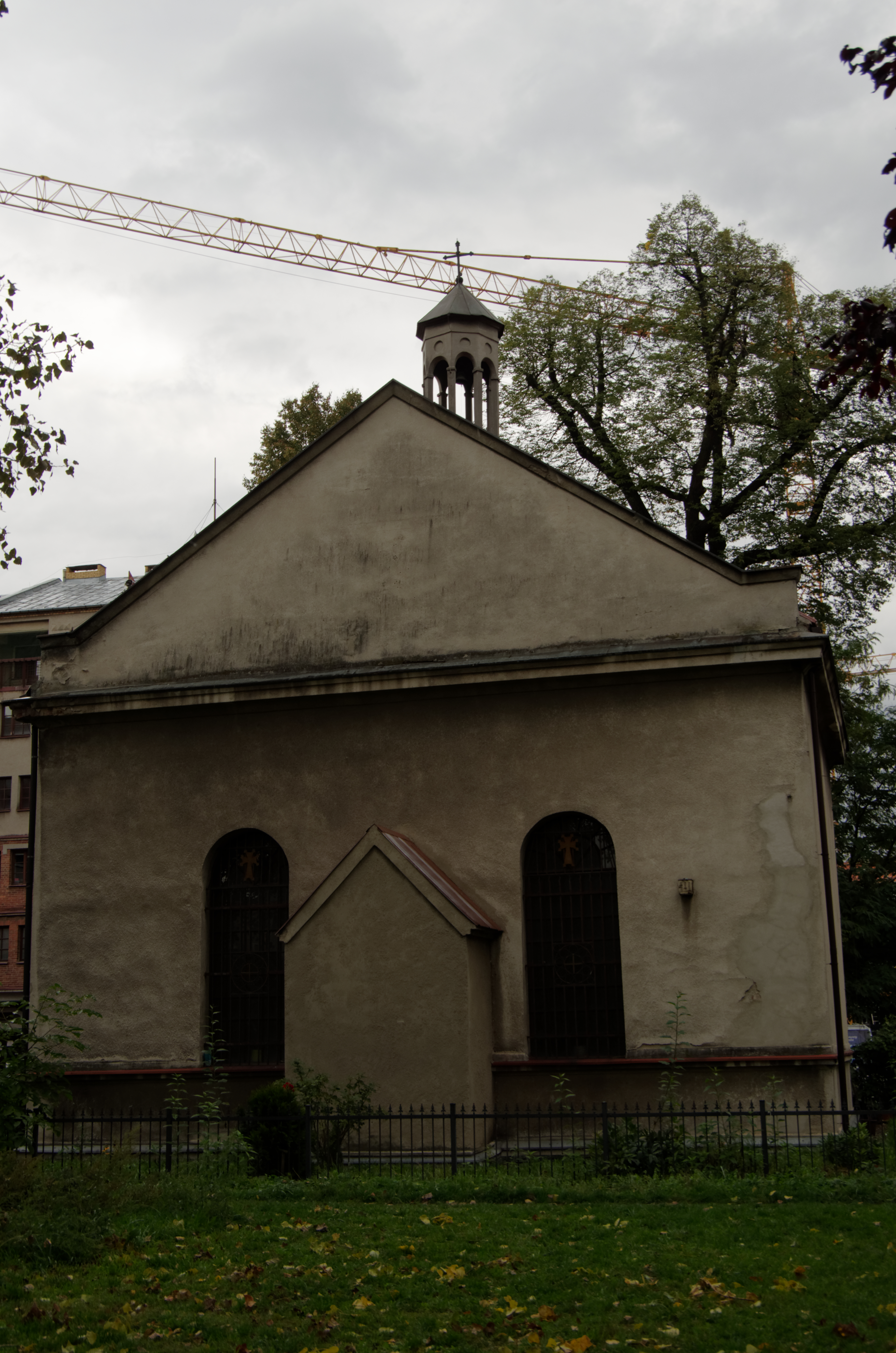
Parish churches of the Armenian Rite Catholic Church in Warsaw, Gdańsk and Gliwice

The Armenian Rite Catholic Church which had been historically centered in Galicia as well as in the pre-1939 Polish borderlands in the east, now has three parishes; one in Gdańsk, one in Warsaw and the other in Gliwice. In 2023, a former hospital chapel in Zabrze was granted to the Armenian Apostolic Church to host its only parish in Poland.

There are also now schools in Poland that have recently opened or added on courses that teach Armenian language and culture either on a regular or supplementary basis in Warsaw and Kraków.

There are some 20 khachkars in Poland, with various, typically multiple, dedications, including in Kraków, Elbląg, Gdańsk, Gliwice, Klebark Wielki, Wrocław, Warsaw, Łódź, Lublin, Zamość, Kurów, Szczecinek, Kielce, Święty Krzyż, Białystok, Kartuzy, Łomna, and Zabrze. The khachkars commemorate both tragic and positive events. The tragic ones include the Turkish-perpetrated Armenian genocide, massacres of Poles and Armenians by Ukrainian nationalists in World War II, Soviet deportations and murders of Armenian Catholic preachers, and the Second Nagorno-Karabakh War. The positive are the Polish-Armenian friendship, centuries-old Armenian presence in Poland, and the anniversaries of the creation of the Armenian alphabet, of the foundation of Armenian Diocese of Lwów, of the restoration of Armenian and Polish independence, and of the visit of Pope John Paul II to Armenia.

The Skwer Ormiański (Armenian Square) in Warsaw and Zaułek Ormiański (Armenian Alley) in Gdańsk are named after the Armenians.

== Cuisine ==
The kołacz of Armenians of Kuty and gandżabur, a traditional soup of Armenians in Poland, are designated traditional foods by the Ministry of Agriculture and Rural Development of Poland.

== Notable Poles of Armenian descent ==
- Simeon of Poland (1584–1639), traveler and writer
- Szymon Szymonowic (1558-1629), writer of Polish Renaissance
- Kajetan Abgarowicz (1856–1909) — writer
- Fr. Karol Antoniewicz (1807–1852) — Catholic priest, Jesuit and poet
- Włodzimierz Antoniewicz (1893–1973) — Polish archaeologist, rector of the University of Warsaw, and a member of the PAN
- Teodor Axentowicz (1859–1938) — painter
- Sadok Barącz (1814–1892) — Galician religious leader, historian, folklorist, archivist
- Roman Barącz (1856–1930) surgeon, otorhinolaryngologist, professor at the Faculty of Medicine of Lviv University, and collector
- Tadeusz Barącz (1849–1905), Polish sculptor
- Antoni Stefanowicz (1858–1929) — painter
- Kajetan Stefanowicz (1886–1920) — painter
- Anna Dymna (b. 1951), actress
- Zbigniew Herbert (1924–1998) — poet and essayist
- Fr. Tadeusz Isakowicz-Zaleski (1956–2024) — Catholic priest, shepherd of the Armenian Rite faithful in southern Poland, historian, charity worker and independence activist during communist rule
- Jerzy Kawalerowicz (1922–2007) — film director
- Ignacy Łukasiewicz (1822–1882) — He was one of the most prominent philanthropists in the Kingdom of Galicia and Lodomeria
- Robert Maklowicz (b. 1963) — journalist
- Stanisław Moniuszko (1819–1872) (by mother) — generally referred to as "the father of Polish national opera"
- Krzysztof Penderecki (1933–2020) — composer
- Fr. Grzegorz Piramowicz (1753–1801) — Catholic priest, educator and philosopher
- Juliusz Słowacki (1809–1849) — poet
- Abp. Józef Teodorowicz (1864–1938) — Armenian Catholic Archbishop of Lviv, renowned for his religious and social work.
- Sonia Bohosiewicz (b. 1975) — actress

== See also ==
- Armenia–Poland relations
- Armenian diaspora
- Immigration to Poland
- Poles in Armenia
- Armenians in Belarus
- Armenians in Lithuania
- Armenians in Russia
- Armenians in Ukraine

== Bibliography ==
- Osiecki, Jakub (2020). "Towarzystwo Polsko-Ormiańskie we Lwowie (1920–1922)". Lehahayer. Czasopismo poświęcone dziejom Ormian polskich (in Polish). No. 7.
- Stopka, Krzysztof (2000). Ormianie w Polsce dawnej i dzisiejszej (in Polish). Kraków: Księgarnia Akademicka. ISBN 83-7188-325-0.
- Stopka, Krzysztof (2010). "Ormianie". In Kopczyński, Michał; Tygielski, Wojciech (eds.). Pod wspólnym niebem. Narody dawnej Rzeczypospolitej (in Polish). Warszawa: Muzeum Historii Polski, Bellona. ISBN 978-83-11-11724-2.
