= Emad al-Janabi =

Iraqi blacksmith and Abu Ghraib detainee

Emad Khudhayir Shahuth al-Janabi (Arabic: عماد خضير شهوته الجنابي) (born c. 1965) was an Iraqi blacksmith detained in Abu Ghraib prison where he alleges he was abused by American military personnel and defense contractors.

== Imprisonment ==
Al-Janabi claimed that in the September following the 2003 invasion of Iraq, his home was raided at 2:00 a.m. by "persons dressed in American military uniforms and civilian clothing" who beat him and his family. Al-Janabi was told he would face execution with his brother and nephew and was then interned in the Abu Ghraib prison in Baghdad. His arrest initially unexplained, Al-Janabi said an interrogating soldier eventually "told me I was a terrorist ... preparing for an attack against the U.S. forces" and he gave forced confessions.

Al-Janabi later described that while detained he was punched, kicked, stripped, chained, hung upside down from a bedframe, kept naked and handcuffed in his cell, and repeatedly deprived of food and sleep. He also claimed to have been threatened with rape, violent death, and execution and witnessed a mock execution of his brother and nephew. He said that after being discovered by the International Committee of the Red Cross during a surprise inspection in October, he was thereafter hidden with contractor help from future inspections as a "ghost detainee".

After over 10 months, Al-Janabi was released without charge in July 2004, at which time photographs and reports of abuses and torture in the prison had become public.

== Lawsuit ==
While in Istanbul, Turkey in May 2008, Al-Janabi filed suit against U.S. military contractors CACI and L-3 Communications, accusing them of "torture, war crimes and civil conspiracy". CACI had provided interrogators to Abu Ghraib and all interpreters were employees of Titan Corporation. L-3 was named as a defendant since it had acquired Titan in 2005, in an effort to boost its intelligence portfolio.

Al-Janabi was seeking unspecified monetary damages. The complaints allege that the contractors participated in abuse, destroyed evidence, blocked reports to the Red Cross, hid prisoners, and misled government and military officials.

Al-Janabi was represented by the Center for Constitutional Rights (CCR) which took the case to establish that "Private military contractors can’t act with impunity outside the law" and have "violated the Geneva Conventions, the Army Field Manual, and the laws of the United States". The conservative Capital Research Center called CCR "the terrorists' legal team" because it had been pushing "to give due process rights to America's terrorist enemies."

Steven Stefanowicz of CACI was specifically named in the case as directing prisoner torture. A statement from a CACI spokesperson denied Al-Janabi's claims, asserting that no CACI employee had been charged with misconduct as an interrogator in Iraq. The case was filed in Los Angeles, USA where Stefanowicz lived, in the federal district court, as "Emad Khudhayir Shahuth Al-Janabi v. Steven A. Stefanowicz, et al" (CV 08-02913). After CCR filed four similar cases the next month, CACI responded that these lawsuits were "vexatious" and the CCR's was "politically driven", with "an ongoing 'big lie' propaganda campaign to keep their lawsuits in the public eye and their personal political agendas in the public light."

Similar class-action lawsuits had been filed against the companies in 2004, with the suit against Titan being dismissed. There remains some debate over which legal system, if any, had jurisdiction over American contractors acting overseas.

== See also ==
- Abu Ghraib torture and prisoner abuse
- Steven Stefanowicz
