= Roman Barącz =

Polish surgeon (1856–1930)

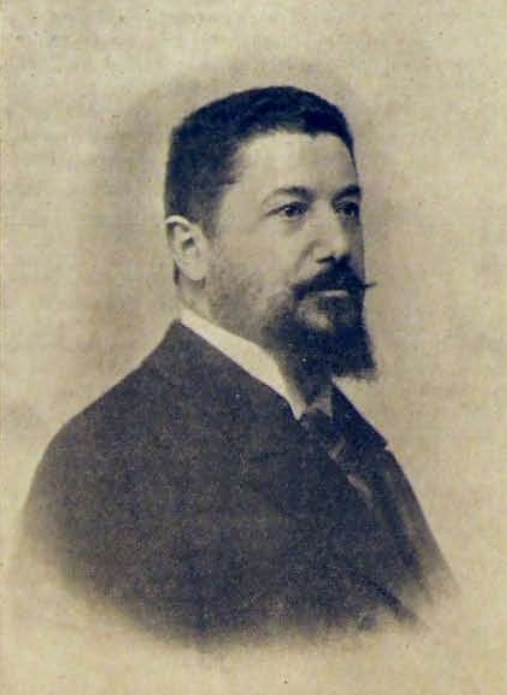
- Born: August 8, 1856
- Died: August 29, 1930 (aged 74)

Roman von Barącz (August 8, 1856 – August 29, 1930) Polish surgeon, otorhinolaryngologist, professor chair of surgery of the University of Lviv, polyglot, and collector, of noble Armenian descent.

He was son of the civil servant Jakub von Barącz and Teresa von Barącz, née von Truchlińska, brother of the mining engineer Erazm von Barącz (1859–1928), the sculptor Tadeusz Barącz (1849–1905), the opera director Władyslaw von Barącz (1865–1919) and the writer Stanisław von Barącz, father of the surgeon Zygmunt von Barącz (1886–1920); married to Maria von Barącz, née Strzyżewska.
