= Karol Antoniewicz =

Polish-Armenian Jesuit and missionary

Karol Antoniewicz (Bołoz.) Armenian: Կարոլ Անտոնեվիչ (born in Nova Skvaryava, Galicia, 6 November 1807; died 14 November 1852) was a Polish-Armenian Jesuit and missionary.

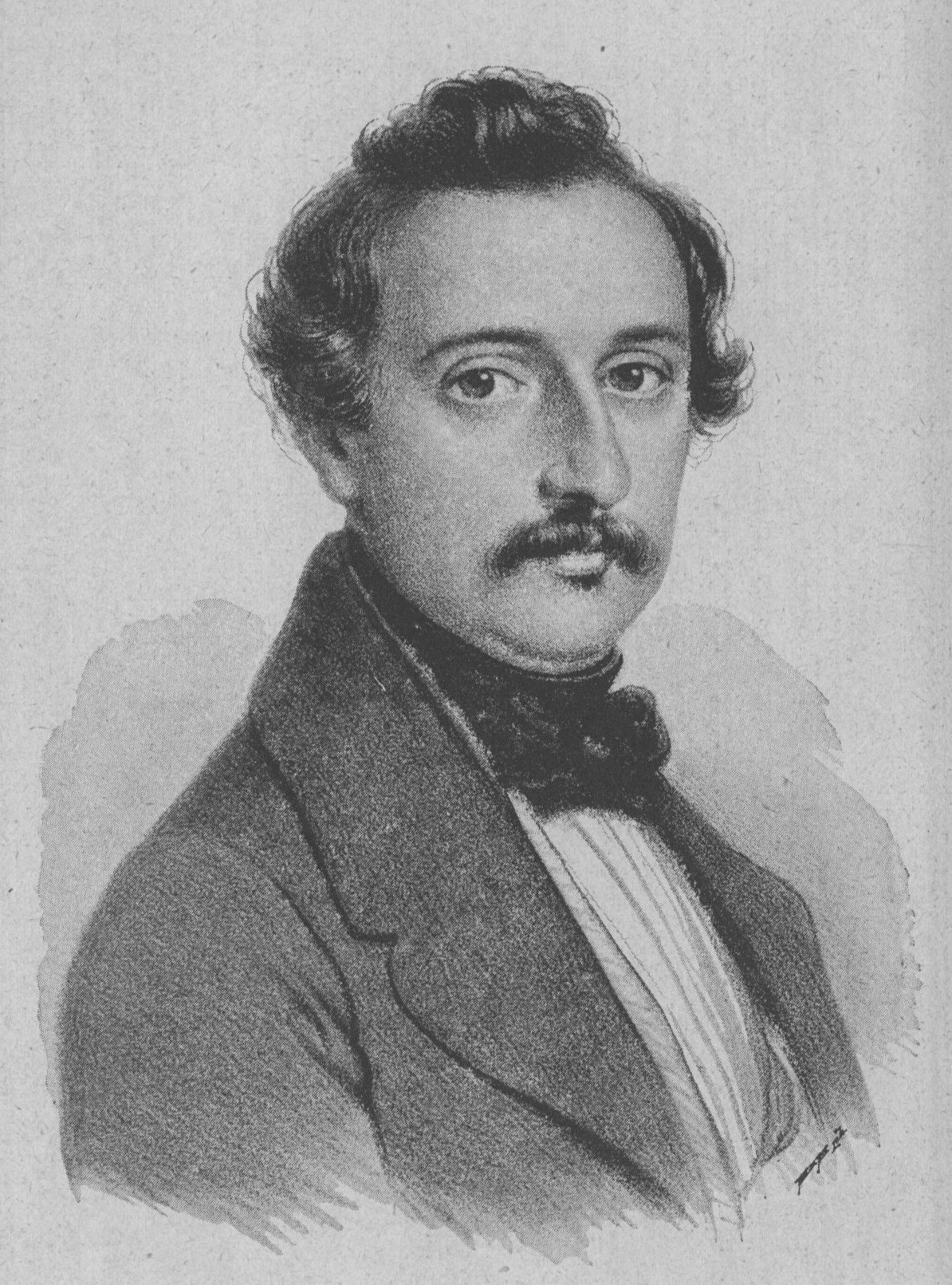
Karol Antoniewicz.

== Life ==
He was the son of Józef Antoniewicz, a nobleman and lawyer. His pious mother Józefa, née Nikorowicz, attended to his early training on their estate at Skwarzawa, where they had moved in 1818.

After the death of his father in 1823, Karol entered the University of Lviv to study law, devoting, however, much time to philology; besides Polish, he spoke fluent German, French, Italian, and English. Here he also gathered material for the history of the Armenians in Poland (his ancestors were Armenians) and wrote Polish and German poetry.

Having finished his course in law with the highest distinction in 1827, he made a tour through Austria and Romania. During the Polish insurrection of 1830-31, he served for some time under General Józef Dwernicki.

In 1833, he married his cousin Zofia Nikorowicz, and settled in Skwarzawa. His marital life ended with the death of his five children, followed shortly by that of his wife, who took religious vows on her death-bed. His mother also died in the Benedictine Order. This, as well as the advice of his spiritual director, Father Frederic Rinn, S.J., induced him to seek admission into the novitiate of the Jesuits at Stara Wieś in September 1839, where he took the solemn vows on 12 September 1841.

His philosophical studies were made at Tarnopol, where he was a colleague of the theologian Cardinal Franzelin. His theological studies he finished at Nowy Sącz. He was ordained priest on 10 October 1844, by Bishop Jan Marceli Gutkowski.

Upon the request of Count D'Este, Governor of Galicia, the Provincial (Father Pierling) appointed him missionary for the Sandec district, where crime and lawlessness (massacre of the nobility, 1846) reigned supreme. During seven months, Antoniewicz gave over twenty missions, preached over 200 sermons. His impaired health, however, compelled him to seek a mountainous climate in spring, 1847. Having recovered, he was assigned to St. Nicholas in Lviv, as preacher, and as confessor for students.

When on 7 May 1848, the Society of Jesus was dissolved in Austria, Antoniewicz went to Silesia (Gräfenberg), returning incognito, however, to Lviv, in 1850. Being discovered, he left the country, stopping at Kraków, just after the conflagration of 18 July 1850, to console the inhabitants. On this occasion, he delivered the sermon "On the ruins of Cracow" (Na zgliszczach Krakowa).

At the insistence of Cardinal Diepenbrock he gave missions in Silesia; there he also founded a house in Nysa, and was appointed its first superior. Asked by Archbishop Leon Przyłuski, he extended his missionary activity to Poznan (1852). He contracted cholera and died of it.

In the church at Obra, where he rests, his friends erected to his memory a monument, surmounted by his bust.

== Works ==
He composed over seventy-six different works; six before he became a Jesuit, and seventy as a Jesuit, twenty-seven of which were published after his death.

In youth he composed many poems; later he gave preference to religious themes. These included:

- Wianek krzyżowy ("Garland of the Cross")
- Wianek majowy ("Wreath of May")
- Jan Kanty, Sw. Jacek ("St. Hyacinth")

He is the author of many devotional and ascetic works, including:

- Czytania świąteczne dla ludu ("Festive Readings for the Faithful")
- Sw. Izydor Oracz ("St. Isidore")
- Groby świętych polskich ("The Tombs of Polish Saints")
- Listy w duchu Bożym do przyjaciół ("Spiritual Letters to Friends")

His sermons were collected and arranged by his fellow Jesuit, Jan Badeni, and published in four volumes (Cracow, 1893, 2d ed.), under the title Kazania Ks. Karola Antoniewicza. Badeni similarly published Zbiór poezji (a collection of poems) in 1898-99.
