= Simeon of Poland =

Polish-Armenian traveler and writer (1584–1639)

- Born: Simeon; 1584; Zamość, Polish–Lithuanian Commonwealth (modern-day Poland)
- Died: 1639 (aged 54–55); Lviv, Polish–Lithuanian Commonwealth (modern-day Ukraine)

Simeon of Poland (Armenian: Սիմեոն Լեհացի, romanized: Simeon Lehatsi, (Note: Traditional Armenian orthography: Սիմէոն Լեհացի) lit. 'Simeon the Pole'; Polish: Symeon z Zamoscia; 1584–1639) (Note: also called Simeon of Lviv) was a Polish-Armenian traveler known for his travelogue on his visit to the Ottoman domains as well as Italy from 1608 to 1619.

== Background ==
With the consecutive invasions of the Armenian highlands by the Seljuks and Mongols during the 11th and 13th centuries, respectively, some Armenians fled far away from their homeland to regions such as Galicia and Volhynia in Eastern Europe, which housed a small Armenian community at the time. The fall of the Armenian Kingdom of Cilicia in the 14th century, Ottoman conquest of parts of Crimea in the 15th century, and the Celali rebellions in the 16–17th centuries prompted more Armenians to pour out of Anatolia and Crimea, many of whom also settled in modern-day Western Ukraine and Poland, giving rise to around thirty Armenian settlements by the 17th century. Mostly composed of artisans and merchants, Armenians of Eastern Europe were concentrated in the cities of Kamianets-Podilskyi and Lvov. They had enjoyed cultural autonomy since medieval times as the Polish King Casimir III the Great allowed them to have their own courts and keep their traditions upon conquering the region. Lvov thus became the regional center of Armenians, with the Armenian Cathedral built in 1363 as well as two churches, a hospice, library, monastery, school, and printing press, which allowed for the creation of many literary works in the Armenian and Armeno-Kipchak (Note: Armeno-Kipchak was a language belonging to the Kipchak branch of the Turkic languages but written in the Armenian alphabet.) languages.

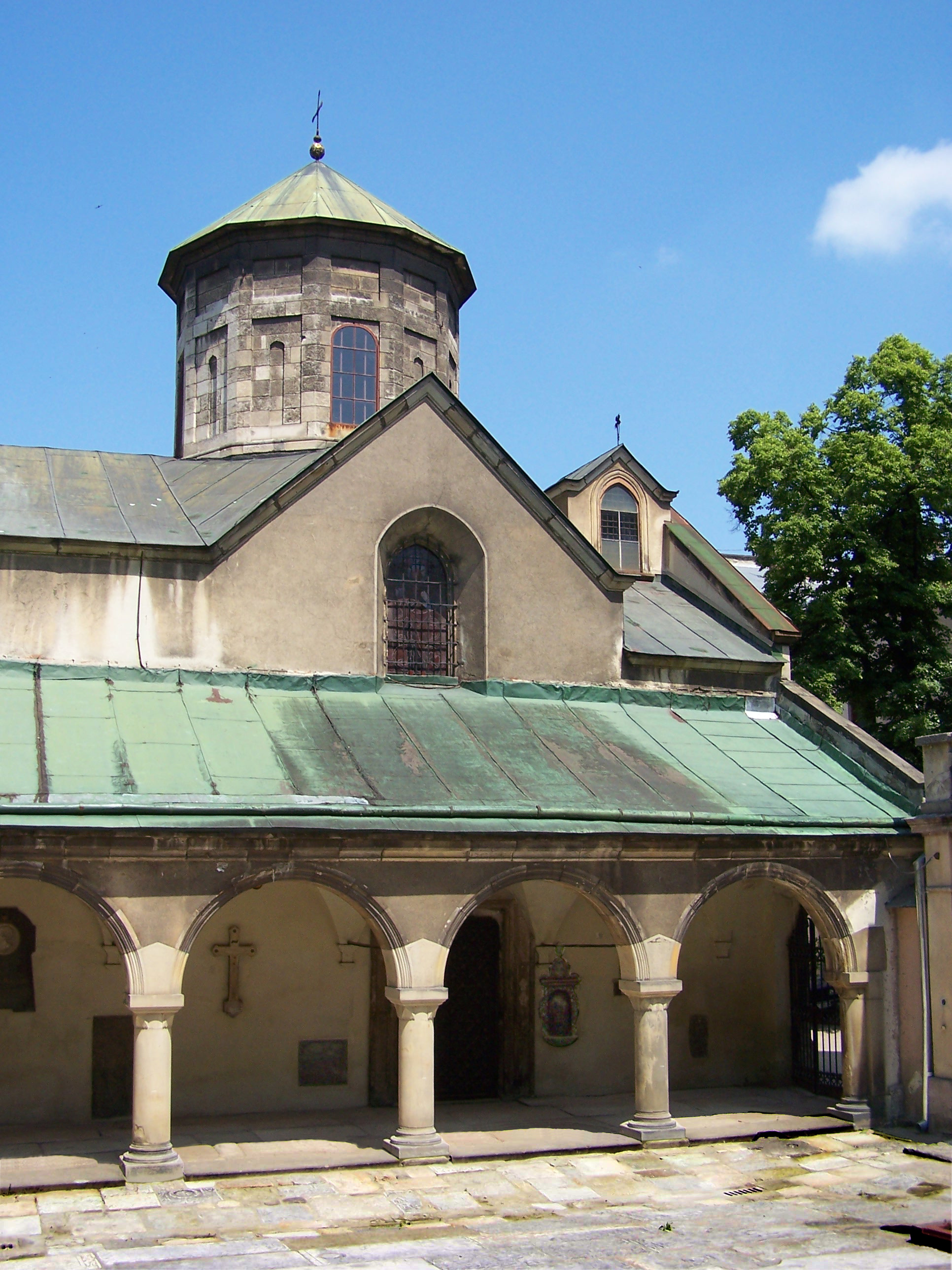
The Armenian cathedral of Lviv

== Early life ==
Simeon's father Mahdesi Martiros and mother Dolvat Khatun were originally from the coastal city of Kaffa in Crimea. They had left their hometown around 1580 and later settled in Zamość. Simeon was born there in 1584 and had three siblings: Hovhannes, Juhar, and Hripsimeh. He lost his mother as an infant in 1586 and his father in 1605, as well as his only brother Hovhannes before 1608. He was raised by his older sister Juhar, who died in 1612, when Simeon was travelling around Venice. Both of his sisters, Juhar and Hripsimeh, were married and had children.

Historian George Bournoutian proposes that Simeon's frequent usage of Turkish words (or the Turkish forms of Arabic and Persian terms) and casual combination with Armenian prefixes and suffixes in his travelogue may not solely be due to him having picked them up during his travels but that he possibly knew Armeno-Kipchak from his youth.

== Education ==
Although his family struggled with poverty, Simeon was able to go to school and was educated by Armenian clerics. According to historian Nerses Akinean, Simeon may have been classmates with renowned poet and translator Hakob Tokhatetsi, who settled in Zamość in 1602. He may have also been tutored by one of the Armenian patriarchs of Constantinople Grigor Kesaratsi and Vardapet Azaria Sasnetsi (died 1628). In his writings, Simeon acknowledged that he wasn't able to reach a prominent position in the Church as a mere dpir ('acolyte'). Though, he grew passionate in collecting religious and historical books, which he continued to do so during his travels. He spent most of his time transcribing rare books and manuscripts. This allowed him to earn an income as a copier operating in Constantinople and Jerusalem.

== Travels ==
According to his own account, Simeon had a deep interest in traveling to non-Christian lands as well as going on a pilgrimage to Jerusalem, Rome, and Mush, where the relics of Saint John the Baptist were thought to be located. Simeon probably planned his travels beforehand. On 15 February 1608, he left Lvov joining a group of Armenian merchants traveling to Rumelia.

=== Lvov to Constantinople ===
Simeon first reported to have reached Sinat’ (either Siret or Sieniawa) after ten days in harsh winter conditions. He described the town as at the border between the "land of the Poles" and the "land of the Vlachs", staying there for a day. After nine days, he was in Suceava, which he described "pleasant-looking" and "pretty". He recorded that the town had three to four hundred Armenian households. Moreover, there were three stone churches, a monastery next to the city, and another two miles away. Among the local population of Armenians, he listed a bishop and two vardapets, one of whom was originally from Hizan.

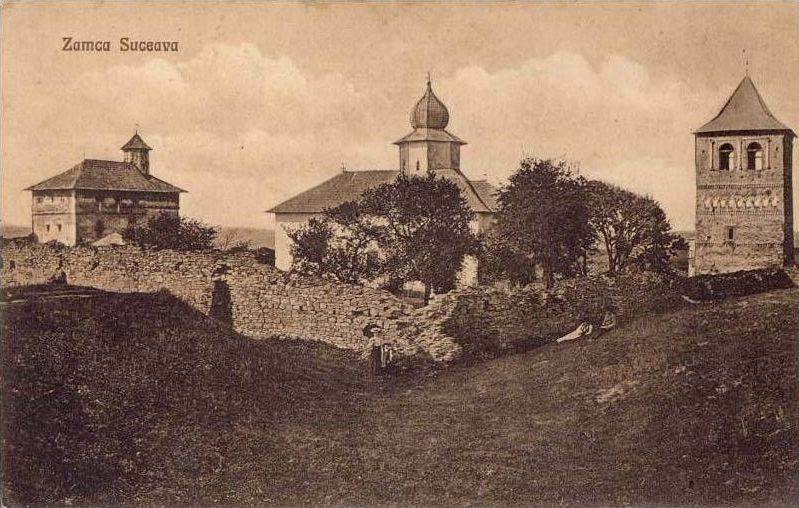
The Armenian monastery of Suceava in 1915

He then joined the Ottoman tax collectors, traveling to Yash-Bazar, where he reported the presence of a wealthy community of 200 Armenian households along with a stone church and a k’ahanas ('ordained priest'). Escorted by the officials and local Armenians, Khoja Hovhannes Keronents and Khoja Khachik, he arrived in Vaslov after two days, again noting an Armenian community, of 20 households, a wooden church, and a k’ahanas. One and a half days later, he reached Bârlad, where he had to stay for four days, which was customary for the officials. In three days, Simeon was in Galas, where Moldavia ended and the "land of the Turks" began. Simeon regarded the nearby Danube as "terrifying, ferocious, wide, and deep, and like a bloodthirsty abyss swallowed people". On Sunday, 22 August 1608, he passed the river and paid the customs tariff in the village of Mijin, not continuing the travel until three days. He then reached the village of Karasu (in two and a half days), Pazarchik (on 26 August), and Provadia (after three days), which included many Armenians with a chapel. Through the challenging path in the Balkan Mountains, he crossed Deliorman and found himself in Kırkkilise, describing it as "an amazing place; there among the mountains, in the ravine, were great cliffs, which grew like trees in a forest".

=== Constantinople and Galata ===
On September 10, he arrived in Constantinople, where he had to spend the whole winter, since he had missed the ship to Egypt. At the time, the land route through Jerusalem was closed as a measure against Safavid Iran. Simeon recorded five Armenian churches in Constantinople: Surp Nikoghayos, Surp Asdvadzadzin, and Surp Sarkis in the neighborhood of Langa, another church in Balat, and Surp Georg in Sulumanastır. Apart from monks, there were 4–5 vardapets, 3 bishops, and over 100 priests in the city. He put the number of native Armenian households at about 80, while Anatolian Armenian households who took refuge in Constantinople, Galata, and Üsküdar after the Celali rebellions, were more than 40 thousand. Overall, he claimed the presence of 40,000 Jewish, 40,000 Greek, and 10,000 Armenian households in the city, with no set number of Muslims, along with 80,000 shops, 30,000 taverns, and unnumbered amount of mosques, charitable organizations, religious schools, hospitals, bazaars, inns, plazas, gardens, orchards, and more. He also wrote:

Istanbul is so large that, if fire destroyed 10,000 or 20,000 homes, the rest will not be aware of it and shall inquire as to the whereabouts of the fire. All the gardens have cypress trees. There are many roads in Istanbul towards the direction of Edirne and other [cities]; they all stretch for a six-day journey and are paved. There are fountains and springs everywhere, as well as road guards and policemen, so that there would be no injuries or fights.

Simeon mistook Galata for a "large and wide island". He mentioned twenty one churches in Galata: ten Greek, ten Frank, the most significant of which was San Domenic, and one Armenian, Surb Lusaworich.

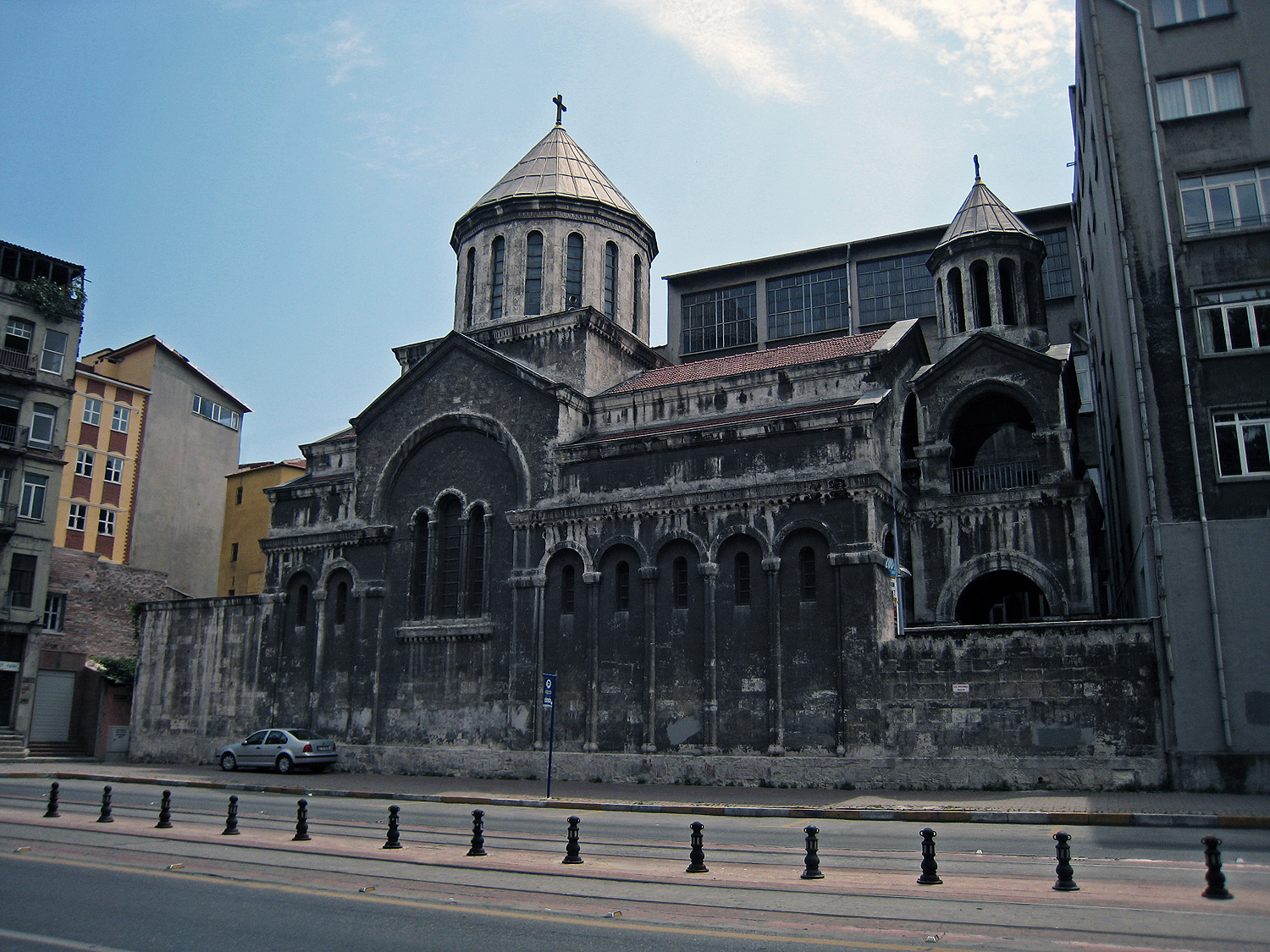
Surb Lusaworich of Galata

He further detailed that in San Domenic, a large pilgrimage used to take place nine weeks after Easter, when both Muslims and Christians, as well as ambassadors of European states gather for a festival. At the time, Galata also had "large and high taverns, some three or four stories high, from where Istanbul, the sea and the boats [were] clearly visible". Galata was very fertile, supplying much of the seafood and produce demands of Istanbul and Egypt.

=== Shores of Marmara and the Aegean Sea ===
A vardapet, Mkrtich Kharpertsi, who was visiting Istanbul at the time, offered Simeon to go on a journey through Bithynia stating that it was five-days from Mush. Simeon accepted, and they embarked on a boat to Mudanya. On the second day, they arrived in the town, where Simeon recorded the existence of several Armenian households and one erets’ but no churches, due to which Armenians performed their religious duties at home. They stayed in the town for five days and visited the bath where John the Evangelist supposedly once served as an attendant and Prochorus was in charge of the heating. Then, they reached Bursa, which Simeon mistook for Ephesus. He wrote about 300 Armenian families, 5 erets’, and an old chapel. While he described the city "very pleasant, rich with fruits and rich in blessings," he also touched on the unhealthy climate, contaminated water, and that half of the city was decimated by the Celali rebels.

Simeon and his companion later found themselves in the town of Mukhalij, (Note: Simeon noted 100 Armenian households and 2 erets’.) staying there for one month and five days, then staying in Bandırma (Note: Housing several Armenian households, an abegha, one priest, but also many Greeks.) for ten days, and subsequently spending two months in the nearby settlement of Etnjuk (Note: 150 Armenian households), half a mile from where there was a large abandoned island housing the ruins of a former colony, Simeon claimed as the original Byzantium. (Note: A nearby small island was inhabited by 5 Armenian families.)

== Travel Accounts of the dpir ==
=== Linguistic features ===
The language used by Simeon in his travelogue is a combination of Classical and early Modern Armenian mixed with various terms from regional Armenian dialects and Turkish. Simeon wrote his travelogue on the road and later edited it in Poland; therefore, the text includes paragraphs that abruptly switch tenses.

=== Editions ===
The original copy in the University of Lviv was lost following the German occupation of the city. Though, Nerses Akinean had earlier copied the manuscript and published it in Vienna in 1936. Upon the initiative taken by Istanbul University, Hrand D. Andreasyan produced the Turkish translation, which according to George Bournoutian, left out the work's introduction, chapters concerning Simeon's travels after he left the Ottoman Empire, and Simeon's anti-Turkish and anti-Muslim comments.

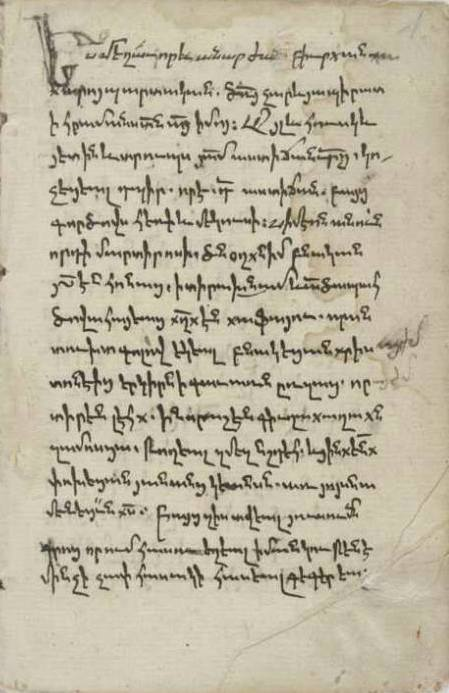
Facsimile of the first page of the travelogue

==== List of available versions and translations ====
- Armenian (Simēon dpri Lehacʻwoy ułegrutʻiwn) by Nerses Akinean (1936)
- English (The Travel Accounts of Simēon of Poland) by George Bournoutian (2007)
- Turkish (Polonyalı Simeon'un Seyahatnâmesi: 1608–1619) by Hrand D. Andreasyan (1964)
- Russian (Simeon Lekhatsi, Putevye Zametki) by M. Darbinian (1965)
- Bulgarian (Armenski ts`tepici za Balkanite XVII-XIX v.) by Hakob Ormandjian (1984) (Note: Translation of a section concerning Eastern Europe.)

== Bibliography ==
- Akinean, Nerses (1936). Simēon dpri Lehac῾woy ułegrut῾iwn, taregrut῾iwn ew yišatakarank῾ Սիմէոն դպրի Լեհացւոյ ուղեգրութիւն, տարեգրութիւն եւ յիշատակարանք (in Armenian). Vienna: Mxit῾arean tparan.
- Andreasyan, Hrand D. (1964). Polonyalı Simeon'un Seyahatnâmesi: 1608–1619 (in Turkish). Istanbul: Istanbul University School of Literature Press.
- Aslanian, Sebouh David (14 March 2014). From the Indian Ocean to the Mediterranean: The Global Trade Networks of Armenian Merchants from New Julfa. University of California Press.
- Bournoutian, George (February 2006). "Armenian Historians". Historians of the Ottoman Empire. University of Chicago.
- Bournoutian, George (2007). The Travel Accounts of Simēon of Poland. Costa Mesa, CA: Mazda Publishers.
- Košťálová, Petra (2020). "The Cultural Heritage of Armenian Traveler Simeon Lehatsi from Poland to Ottoman Empire: Contribution to the History of Polish-Lithuanian Commonwealth". Art of the Armenian Diaspora, World Art Studies. XX.
