= Antoni Stefanowicz =

Polish painter (1858–1929)

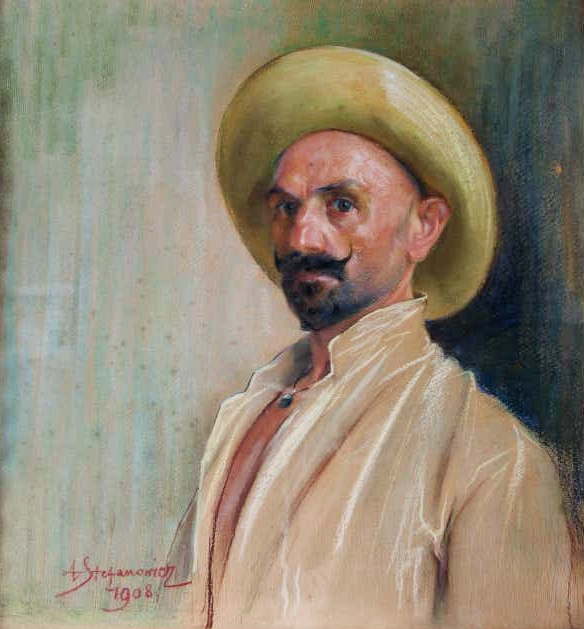
Self-portrait (1908)

Antoni Stefanowicz (1858, Tovtry - 17 December 1929, Lwów) was a Polish painter and art teacher of Armenian ancestry; specializing in portraits.

== Biography ==
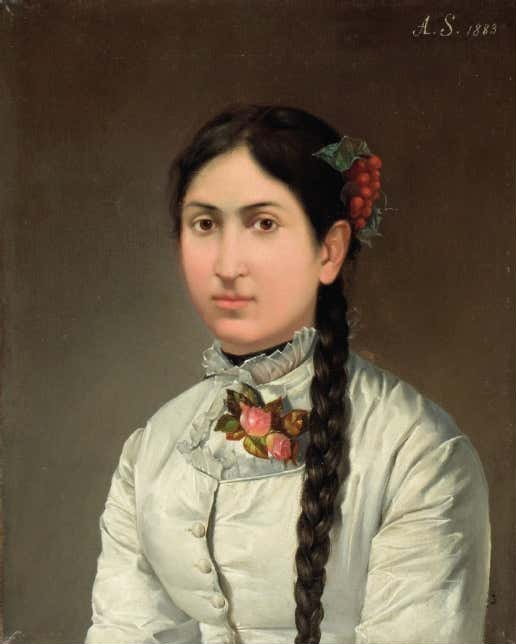
Portrait of a Young Woman

His parents, Kajetan and Emilia, were major landowners. From 1876 to 1879, he studied at the Academy of Fine Arts, Vienna, with Carl Wurzinger, Christian Griepenkerl, and August Eisenmenger. After graduating, he worked as a teacher of drawing in Drohobycz. His first showing came in 1883, at an exhibition of the Kraków Society of Friends of Fine Arts, and was awarded the title of Professor in 1887. He left Drohobycz in 1893, to take a similar teaching position in Lwów. That same year he became a member, then deputy director of the Examination Commission for Teachers; a position he held until 1905. From 1902, he was a member of the National School Council, and was instrumental in reorganizing the methods of drawing instruction. He also wrote two drawing textbooks for teachers.

He was married to Maria née Krzysztofowicz. They had two children: Emilia, an activist who served on the Lwów City Council, and Kajetan, also a painter, who was killed in the Polish-Soviet War.

In 1906, he became an inspector for industrial schools throughout Austria, and held that position until 1914. Following the Russian invasion of Galicia, he and his family were forced to flee to Biała. They returned to Lwów when Poland gained its independence in 1918, and he once again became a member of the National School Council; striving to reform the vocational schools and ensure that they were fully nationalized. When the council was abolished, he became head of the Department of Vocational Education and also served on the board of trustees of the Lwów School District. He retired in 1924, to devote more time to his orphaned grandchildren.

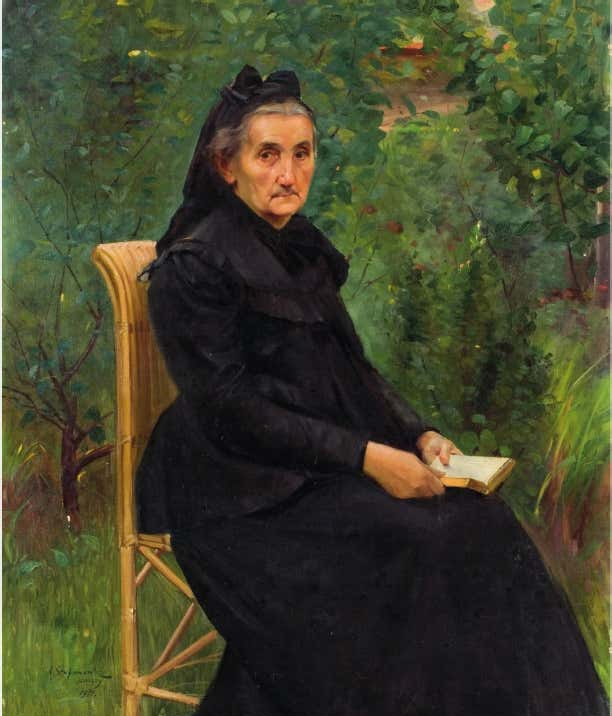
Portrait of the Artist's Mother

In 1910, he was one of the organizers, and a jury member, of the Universal Exhibition of Polish Art. He was the recipient of numerous honors, including the Order of the Iron Crown (1911), and the Officer's Cross of the Order of Polonia Restituta (1923).

In addition to his portraits, he created genre scenes and religious art, as well as decorations at the Theatre of Opera and Ballet (1900). He was also an advisor to Archbishop Józef Teodorowicz, regarding restoration of the Armenian Cathedral. In his final years, he wrote poetry.

After World War II, many of his paintings remained in what is now Lviv, Ukraine, at the National Art Gallery, and in Chernivtsi. They may also be seen at the National Museum, Wrocław, and in Gliwice.
