= Steven Stefanowicz =

American torturer

Steven Anthony Stefanowicz was involved, as a private contractor for CACI International, in the interrogations at Abu Ghraib prison in Iraq.

== Life prior to Abu Ghraib ==
Steven Stefanowicz grew up in the suburban Philadelphia town of Telford, Pennsylvania. He graduated from Souderton Area High School in 1988. He was a center on the boys' basketball team, and a class leader. He graduated with a B.S. from the University of Maryland in 1995. He moved to Australia in 1999 following his Australian then-girlfriend Joanna Buttfield. A naval reservist, following the September 11 attacks, he sought full-time deployment with the Navy in 2002. He left the Navy in September 2003 and found employment with CACI.

== Activity related to Abu Ghraib ==
Stefanowicz was "a contract interrogator for the 205th Intelligence Brigade." He was known in the prison by the nickname "Big Steve". It has been alleged that he ordered and oversaw abusive interrogations which some have labelled as torture.

According to the New York Times, "In mid-August, a team of civilian interrogators led by Steven Stephanowicz, a former Navy petty officer and an employee of a Virginia company called CACI International, began work at Abu Ghraib under a classified one-year military contract. ... Their job was to conduct interrogations in conjunction with military police and military intelligence units, according to a company memorandum."

In the report by Major General Antonio M. Taguba regarding the alleged acts of brutality, abuse, and torture at the Enemy Prisoner of War facility at Abu Ghraib and other Enemy Prisoner of War Camps in Iraq and Afghanistan, Taguba said, "'Specifically I suspect that Col. Thomas M. Pappas, Lt. Col. Steve L. Jordan, Mr. Steven Stephanowicz and Mr. John Israel were either directly or indirectly responsible for the abuses at Abu Ghraib and strongly recommend immediate disciplinary actions ..."

In an interview with a military investigator, Col. Thomas Poppas described Stefanowicz as "out of control" in his commission of abuses. Poppas claims to have spoken to his superiors about this multiple times.

Taguba said that Stefanowicz "should be given an official reprimand, have [his security clearance] reviewed, and, in the case of Stephanowicz, have his security clearance revoked and his employment as a civilian contractor terminated."

However, the online diary of another CACI interrogator at Abu Ghraib, Joe Ryan, reveals that a "Steve Stefanowicz" was still working at the prison on April 26, 2004, suggesting that Taguba's conclusions were ignored until the prison abuse scandal broke in the media.

== Alleged abuses ==
According to testimony given by military policeman Pvt. Ivan Frederick II at the court-martial of Sgt. Michael J. Smith, Stefanowicz ordered the use of unmuzzled dogs to scare prisoners. The Fay Report finds this allegation "highly plausible".

"In an interview with Army investigators on April 6 and 7, 2005, Cpl. Charles Graner accused Stefanowicz of leading abuse...Under Stefanowicz's direction, according to Graner, prisoners could be put on sleep plans: 20 hours awake, four hours of rest. They could be put in stress positions. They could be sexually humiliated."

Stefanowicz allegedly ordered women's underwear put on a prisoner's head, and tying that same prisoner's hands above his head to a window until the prisoner passed out.

It is also alleged that Stefanowicz ordered a prisoner apparently suffering from appendicitis not be given his prescribed pain medication.

== Credibility of abuse allegations ==
Stefanowicz and his attorney denied these allegations, and claimed that Stefanowicz had even attempted to address a case of suspected abuse.

General Taguba considers Stefanowicz's denials false, saying he "made a false statement to the investigating team regarding the locations of his interrogations, the activities of his interrogations and his knowledge of abuses." Taguba's report further states, "He also allowed and possibility instructed MPs who had no knowledge of interrogation techniques to facilitate the activities by setting conditions which he 'clearly knew his instructions equated to physical abuse'".

Army Chief Warrant Officer John D. Graham – an interrogation operations officer at Abu Ghraib – supports Stefanowicz and says Stefanowicz expressed concern of the treatment of prisoners and took the issue of mistreatment to superiors.

== Legal repercussions ==
Stefanowicz has not been criminally prosecuted based on the allegations. A court martial is not possible because Stefanowicz was a civilian. Standard criminal prosecution may not be possible due to legalities surrounding private military contractors in Iraq, including the fact that the CACI contract was with the Department of the Interior.

On July 30, 2004 the Al Rawi v. Titan Corporation class-action civil suit was filed in the U.S. District Court for the Southern District of California naming Stefanowicz as a defendant.

On May 5, 2008, Stefanowicz was named as a defendant in the civil suit "Emad Khudhayir Shahuth Al-Janabi v. Steven A. Stefanowicz, et al" in the U.S. District Court for the Central District of California.

== See also ==
- Abu Ghraib
- Abu Ghraib prisoner abuse
- Human rights situation in post-Saddam Iraq
