= Kajetan Stefanowicz =

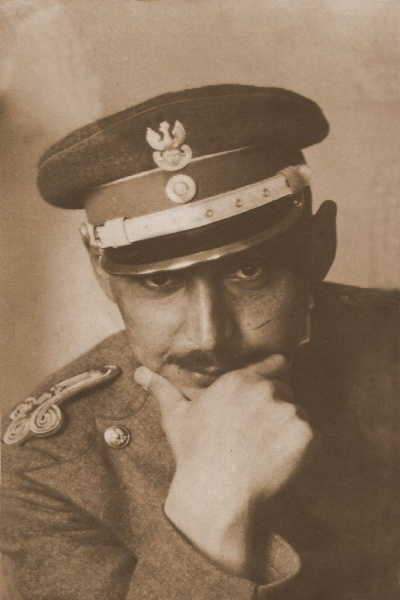
- Kajetan Stefanowicz in 1920
- Born: 12 July 1886; Drohobycz, Poland
- Died: 20 September 1920 (aged 34); Near Rohaczów
- Known for: Painter and illustrator
- Movement: Art-Nouveau

Kajetan Stefanowicz (12 July 1886, in Drohobycz – 20 September 1920, near Rohaczów) was a Polish Art-Nouveau painter and illustrator of Armenian ancestry who served as a Rotmistrz (Cavalry Captain) with the Polish Legions in World War I.

== Biography ==
He was taught the basics of drawing and painting by his father, the portrait painter, Antoni Stefanowicz. This was followed by studies at the Kraków Academy of Fine Arts with Józef Pankiewicz and Józef Mehoffer; the Academy of Fine Arts, Munich, with Otto Seitz, and private lessons in Paris with Ferdinand Humbert.

He began working primarily as an illustrator; favoring fairy tales and Orientalist themes. He also did posters and designed women's clothing and furniture. Later, he painted decorations at the offices of the Land Credit Society in Lwów (now a branch of the National Bank of Ukraine) and was a co-founder of the artistic and literary magazine, Wianki (Garlands). Along with many Polish artists, he was a contributor to Tygodnik Illustrowany.

In February, 1915, he joined the Legion Wschodni, under the command of Władysław Belina-Prażmowski, and received the nickname "Soplica". He served throughout the war and participated in the Battle of Lemberg. During the Polish-Soviet War, he fought in the Battle of Koziatyn and the seizure of Chyrów. He was killed just before the beginning of the truce.

In 1916, he published Song of the Legionnaires: drawings of Kajetan Stefanowicz - Petty Officer 1st Regiment of the Polish Legions, a collection of engravings. He received several posthumous awards, including the Order Virtuti Militari, Cross of Independence and Cross of Valour, and was buried at the Cemetery of the Defenders of Lwów.

== Selected paintings ==
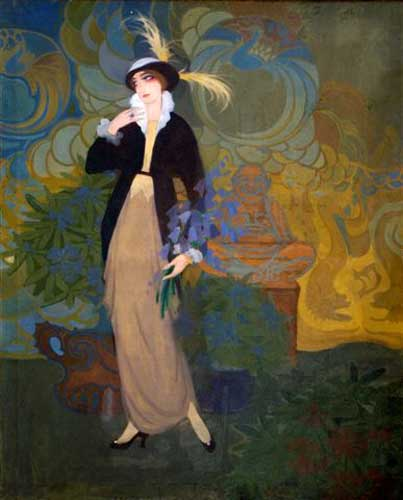
Parisian

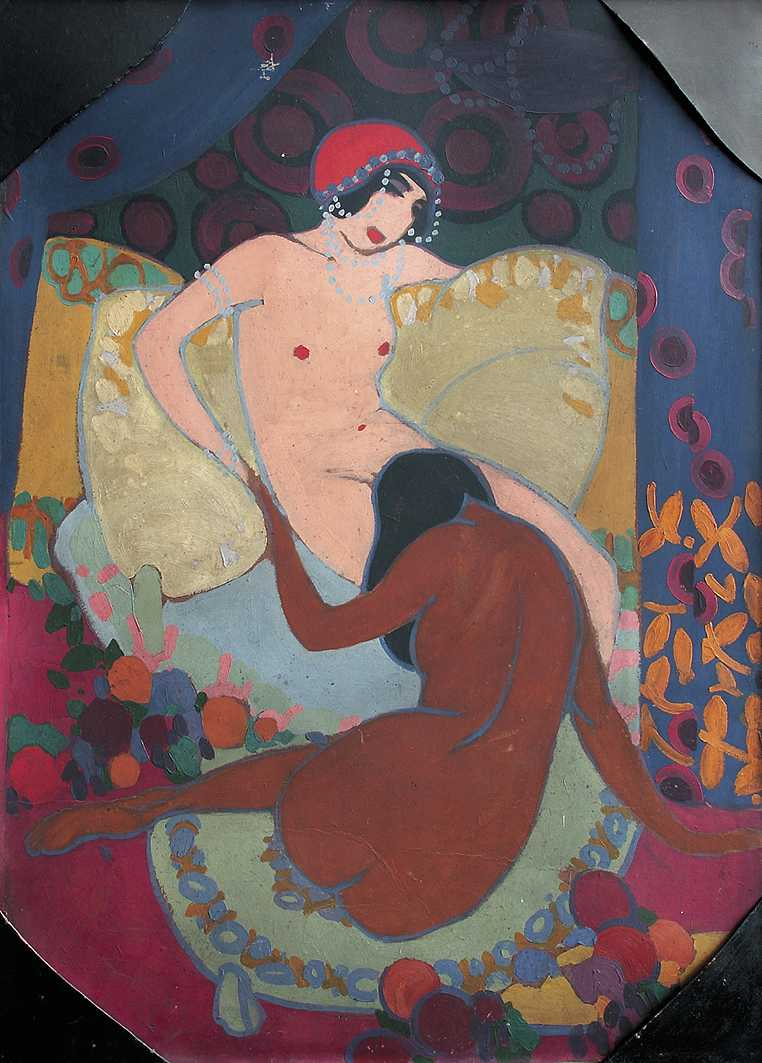
Two Women

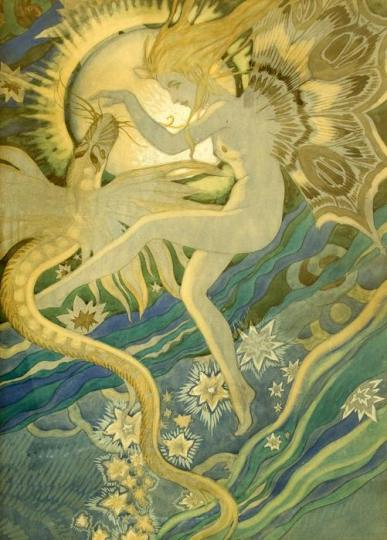
Woman with a Serpent

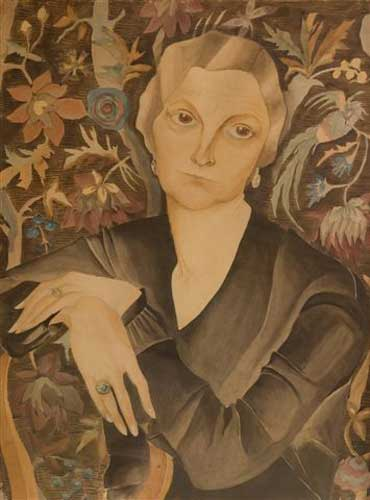
Portrait of his Wife
