= Armenian monastery of Suceava =

Armenian Apostolic monastery in Romania

Coordinates: 47°39′10″N 26°14′38″E

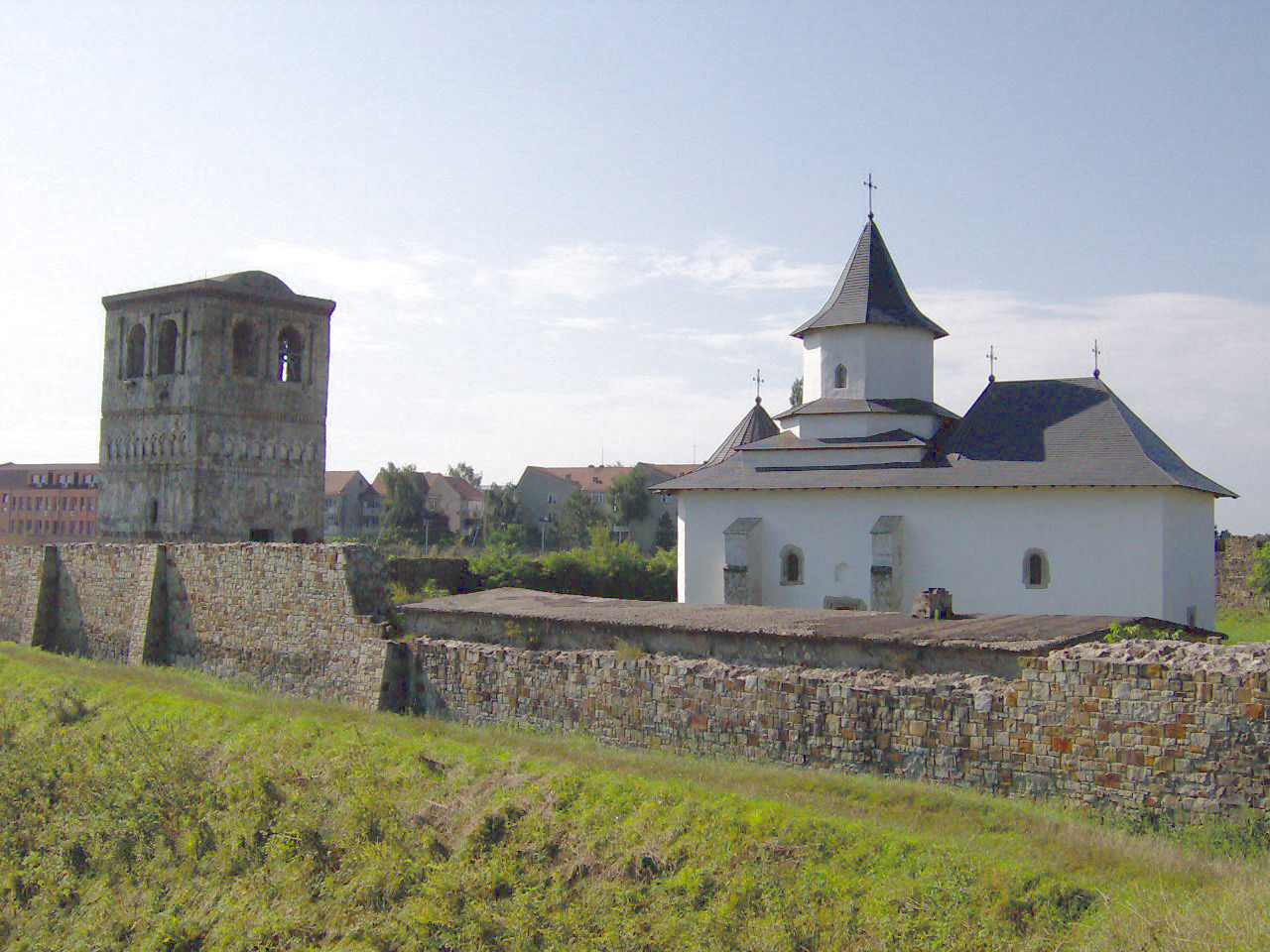
The Church of Saint Auxentius and the Bell tower

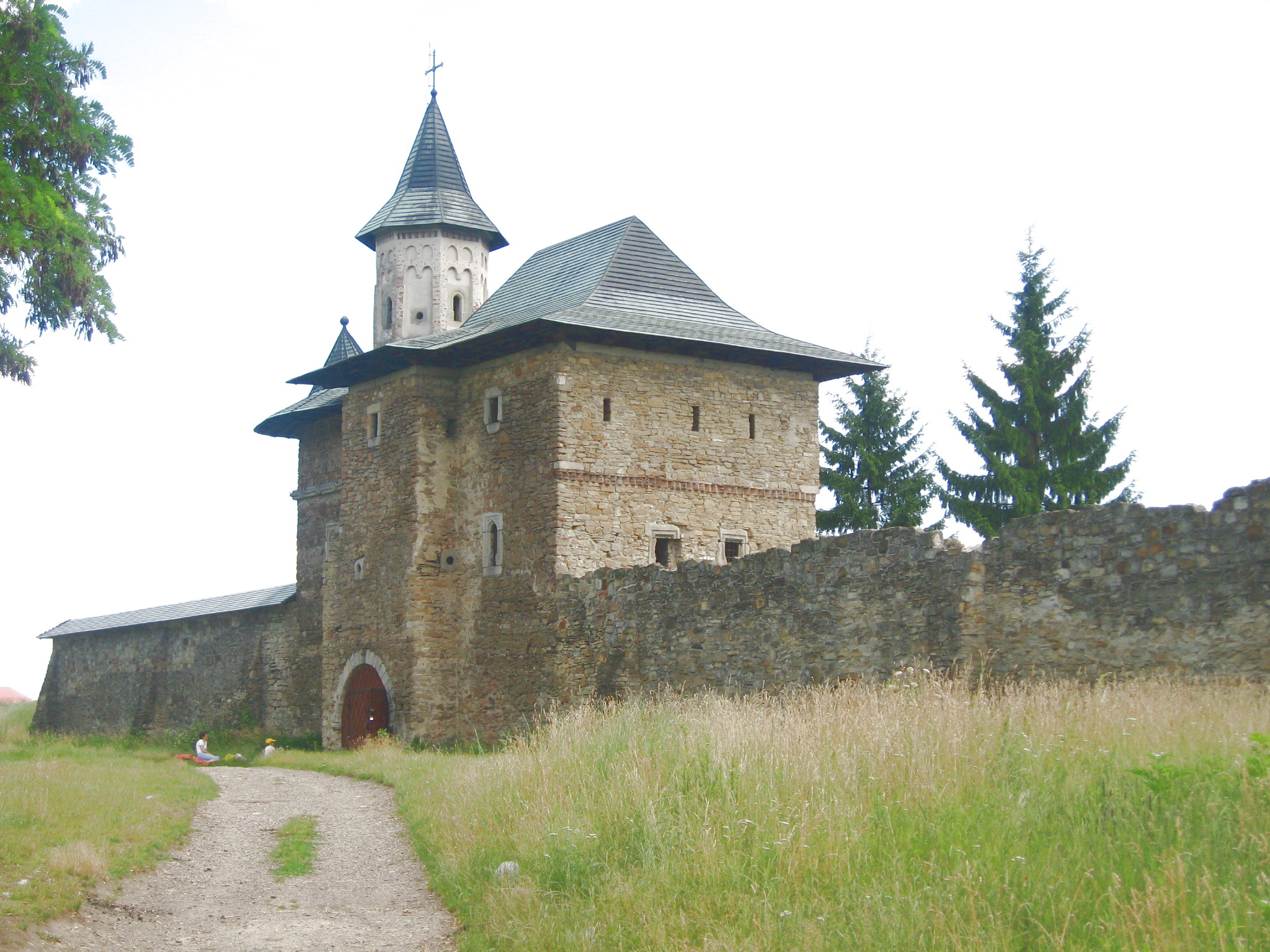
Building containing the Chapel of Saint Gregory the Illuminator

The Armenian monastery of Suceava, also known as "Zamca", is a monastery of the Armenian Apostolic Church, dating from the 15th century, in the town of Suceava in northern Romania's Bukovina district.

The monastery was completed in the early 15th century, during the reign of Moldavian Hospodar Alexandru I Mușat. It was built as the bishop's seat for the local Armenian Church in 1401, which was founded by Alexandru I. Saint Auxentius Church was designed to be the center of the complex. The church was renovated or rebuilt in 1606, when a number of other structures were added, among them the belltower, the gate, and a residential structure with a chapel dedicated to Gregory the Illuminator, all of which survive to this day. The church's interior was decorated with murals in the 18th century.

When James Louis Sobieski (1667–1737) attempted to ascend to the Moldavian throne, he used the monastery as his base of operations. In 1690 it became the headquarters of the Polish Army for all of their operations in Moldavia related to Poland's participation in the War of the Holy League against the Ottoman Empire. Staying at the monastery for several years, the Poles built an extensive network of bastion fortifications, which are well preserved to this day. The monastery's popular name, "Zamca", likely comes from this period; it is derived from zamek, the Polish word for castle.

== Bibliography ==
- W. Korsak, J. Tokarski, Rumunia, Pascal 2004, s. 205–206.
- Ł. Galusek, M. Jurecki, A. Dumitru, Rumunia. Mozaika w żywych kolorach, Bezdroża 2004, s. 155–156.
- M. Jurecki, Bukowina. Kraina łagodności, Bezdroża 2001, s. 192–193.
- R. Brykowski, T. Chrzanowski, M. Kornecki, Sztuka Rumunii, Ossolineum 1979, s. 89, 92–93.
- J. Demel, Historia Rumunii, Ossolineum 1970, s. 205.
