= Willard A. Saunders =

Decorated submarine commander

Willard Arthur Saunders
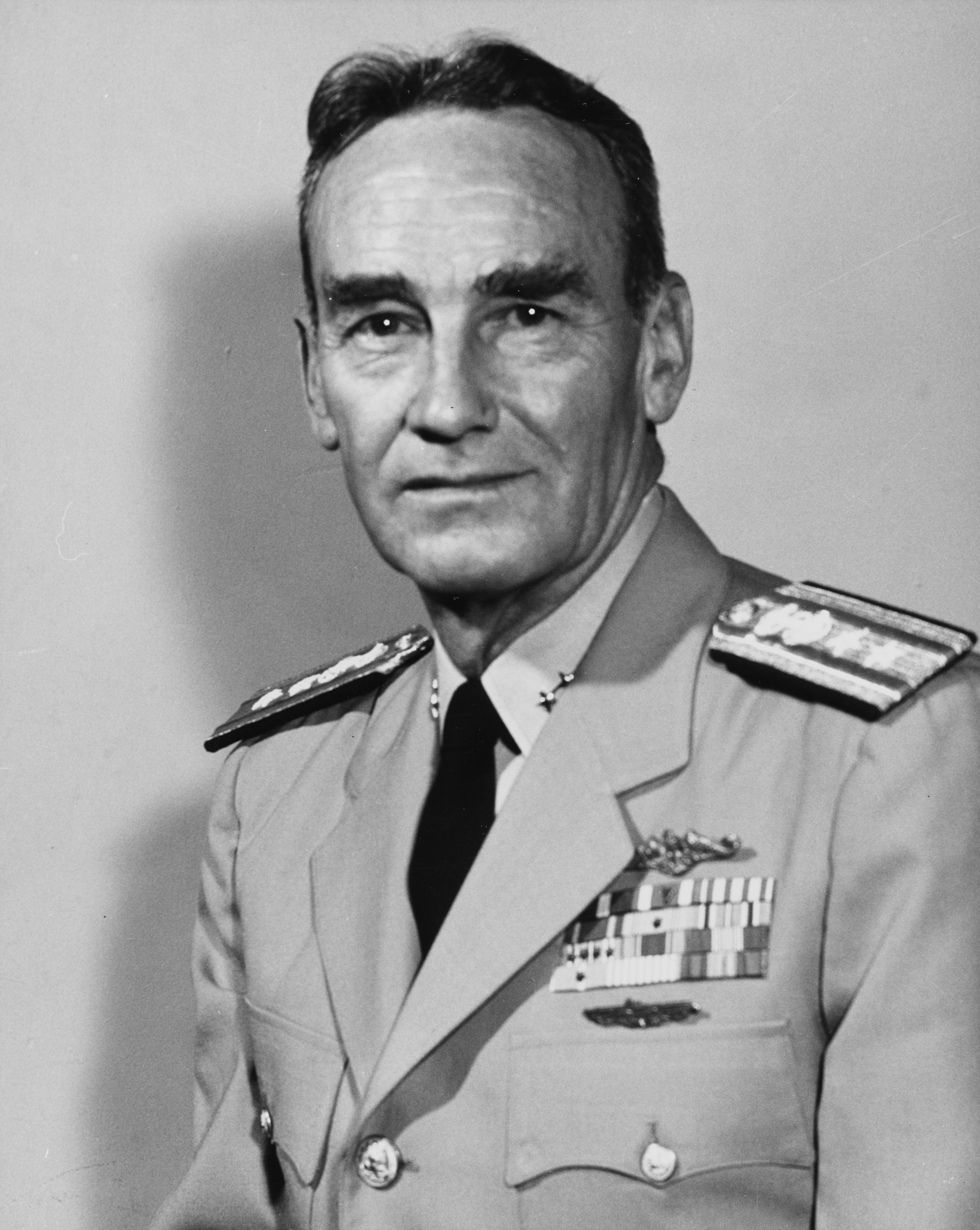
- RADM Willard A. Saunders, USN
- Born: October 25, 1904; Escanaba, Michigan, US
- Died: November 2, 1969 (aged 65); Bethesda Naval Hospital, Maryland, US
- Burial place: United States Naval Academy Cemetery
- Alma mater: United States Naval Academy
- Spouse: Eleanor Louise Kyle
- Children: CDR Wesley Whitin Saunders
- Military career
- Allegiance: United States
- Branch: United States Navy
- Service years: 1927–1957; 1962–1964
- Rank: Rear admiral
- Nickname: "Bill"
- Commands: USS S-21 (SS-126); USS S-26 (SS-131); USS S-24 (SS-129); USS S-30 (SS-135); USS Grayback (SS-208); USS Muskallunge; Submarine Division 62; Submarine Division 73; Submarine Base Key West; Destroyer Squadron 30; USS Mount Olympus; USS Pelican (AM-27)
- Conflicts: Nicaraguan Campaign; Yangtze Patrol; World War II; Korean War
- Awards: Navy Cross; Legion of Merit; Commendation Medal

Willard Arthur Saunders (October 25, 1904 – November 2, 1969) was a highly decorated submarine commander in the United States Navy during World War II and later rear admiral. A graduate of the Naval Academy, he distinguished himself as commanding officer of the submarine Grayback on war patrols in early 1942; he was decorated with the Navy Cross, the United States' second-highest decoration awarded for valor in combat.

Saunders remained in the Navy following the war and held several important commands, including command of Submarine Base Key West and Destroyer Squadron 30. He retired in 1957 and was advanced to the rank of rear admiral on the retired list for having been specially commended in combat. However, he was recalled to active duty five years later and served as director of the International Staff of the Inter-American Defense Board from July 1, 1963, to August 31, 1964.

== Early career ==
Saunders was born on October 25, 1904, in Escanaba, Michigan, the son of Arthur and Sarah Saunders. His family later moved to Kalispell, Montana, where he graduated from Flathead High School in the summer of 1923. Saunders then received an appointment to the United States Naval Academy at Annapolis, Maryland, and, during his time there, he was active on the bowling team and Gymkhana Class committee.

Many of his classmates became flag officers later including future Chief of Naval Operations George W. Anderson, Jr.; Admiral John Thach; vice admirals Glynn R. Donaho and Herbert D. Riley; Marine lieutenant generals John C. Munn and Alan Shapley; rear admirals Clarence E. Coffin, Samuel H. Crittenden Jr., Timothy F. Donohue, Thomas J. Hamilton, Herbert L. Hoerner, William P. Chilton, Alexander M. Kowalzyk, William L. Knickerbocker, Leland R. Lampman, William H. Leahy, William F. Royall, Brooke Schumm; Marine major generals Marion L. Dawson, Francis M. McAlister, Samuel S. Jack, Jack P. Juhan, David F. O'Neill, Henry R. Paige; and Marine brigadier generals Richard P. Ross Jr., Walter L. J. Bayler, Joseph W. Earnshaw, Harold D. Hansen, Archie E. O'Neil, Miles S. Newton, George H. Potter and Earl S. Piper.

Saunders graduated with Bachelor of Science degree on June 2, 1927, and was commissioned ensign on that date. He was subsequently assigned to the battleship Maryland and took part in the voyage to Latin America, before he was transferred to light cruiser Marblehead. While aboard Marblehead, Saunders participated in the naval operations in the waters of Nicaragua in order to supervise elections in 1928 in that country.

The Marblehead then sailed for Shanghai, China, where she contributed to the show of force aimed at the protection of American and other foreign nationals of Shanghai International Settlement during operations against that city through the summer of 1927, in Chinese Civil War. They remained in China until August 1928, when Marblehead returned to the United States and joined the Atlantic Fleet.

Saunders was detached from Marblehead in December 1929 and ordered to the Naval Torpedo Station at Newport, Rhode Island, for torpedo instruction. He completed the course in June 1930 and was promoted to the rank of Lieutenant (junior grade). Saunders was then sent to the Naval Submarine Base New London, Connecticut, for submarine instruction, which he completed by the end of the year and departed for the Far East for duty with the Asiatic Fleet.

He then served consecutively aboard the submarines S-34 and S-36 during the patrols off the coasts of China and the Philippines. In January 1932, Saunders was transferred to the submarine tender Canopus, the flagship of Submarine Squadron 5 and participated in the patrol cruises with Asiatic Fleet.

In June 1934, Saunders was ordered back to the United States and entered the postgraduate course in marine engineering at the United States Naval Academy at Annapolis, Maryland. Upon the completion of the course in June 1936, he was promoted to lieutenant and assumed command of submarine S-21, operating with Pacific Fleet from Pearl Harbor, Hawaii. Saunders later commanded submarine S-24 and remained with the Pacific Fleet for next four years.

== World War II ==
During summer 1940, Saunders was transferred to minesweeper Pelican and participated in operations with the Commander, Aircraft, Scouting Force in Atlantic. He served as ship's acting commander in June 1941, when he assumed command of newly commissioned submarine Grayback. Saunders led his vessel during the patrols in the Caribbean and Chesapeake Bay in order to prevent Nazi U-Boots from the scouting of the areas.

Following the Japanese Attack on Pearl Harbor and the United States entry into World War II, Saunders was promoted to lieutenant commander on December 16, 1941, and led his submarine for first war patrol along the coast of Saipan and Guam in the Mariana Islands. During the period from February to April 1942, he directed his ship in several successful attacks on armed enemy vessels without damage or injury to material or personnel of his command and received the Navy Cross, the United States' second-highest decoration awarded for valor in combat. Saunders was also promoted to the temporary rank of commander on September 10, 1942.

In September 1943, Saunders was ordered to Naval Submarine Base New London, Connecticut, and assumed command of newly commissioned submarine Muskallunge. He took part in the attacks on enemy supply convoys near Palaus and received Navy Commendation Medal with Combat "V". Saunders remained in command of that vessel until November 1943, when he was appointed Acting Commander Submarine Division 62. He then served as Operations Officer Submarine Squadron 6 for the remainder of the War. Saunders was promoted to the temporary rank of captain on March 20, 1945.

== Postwar service ==
By the end of May 1945, Saunders assumed command of Submarine Division 73 and held that command until October 1945, when he was ordered to the Naval Station Key West, Florida, for duty as Commander Submarine Service Group there. He reverted to the peacetime rank of Commander and assumed command of destroyer Caperton at Charleston Navy Yard, South Carolina, in March 1946. He supervised the decommissioning of that ship in June and July 1946 and returned to Key West for duty as Commander Submarine Base there.

During his service there, Saunders hosted several times President Harry S. Truman, who had his "Little White House" there during the Winter season. During his tenure at Key West, Saunders was presented with the Secretary of the Navy Award for Achievement in Safety. He was detached from that assignment in June 1948 and ordered to Rio de Janeiro, Brazil for duty as Naval Attaché and Naval Attaché for Air. Saunder served in this capacity until August 1951 and received Order of Naval Merit, rank Commander by the Government of Brazil.

Saunders then assumed command of amphibious force command ship Mount Olympus and commanded here during the NATO naval exercises Operation Mainbrace and Longs in Northern Europe and the Mediterranean from August through December 1952. In February 1953, Saunders assumed duty as Commander, Destroyer Squadron 30 and took part in the naval operations off the coast of Korea during the war. He then participated in the patrol cruises in South China Sea and made visit to Saigon, French Indochina. Saunders retired from active duty on July 1, 1957, after 30 years of commissioned service and was advanced to the rear admiral on the retired list for having been specially commended in combat.

He then worked as representative of the Pure Oil Company in Brazil, Argentina and Libya, before he was recalled to active duty in early 1963 and assigned to the Office of the Chief of Naval Operations. In July that year, he was appointed Director of the International Staff of the Inter-American Defense Board and held this assignment until the end of August 1964, when he retired for second time. While in this capacity, Saunders was responsible to the Council of Delegates of the Board for the leadership and guidance required to produce successful solutions to the problems of common hemispheric defense of the American Continent. Saunders was decorated with Legion of Merit for his service in that assignment.

== Retirement ==
Saunders settled in Alexandria, Virginia, with his wife the former Eleanore Louise Kyle of Severn Side Farm. Rear admiral Saunders died on November 2, 1969, aged 65 at Bethesda Naval Hospital after a lengthy illness. He was buried with full military honors at United States Naval Academy Cemetery, Maryland. Together with his wife, they had four children: son Wesley (who served in the Navy and retired as Commander); and daughters Judith, Eleanore and Patience, who married Army Captain Thomas W. Herren Jr., the son of lieutenant general Thomas W. Herren.

== Decorations ==
Here is the ribbon bar of Rear admiral Willard A. Saunders:

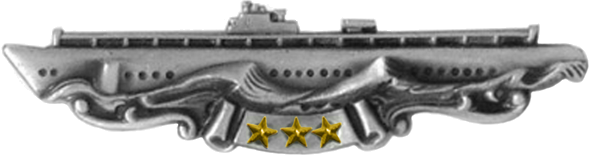

Submarine Warfare insignia
1st Row	Navy Cross		Legion of Merit
2nd Row	Navy Commendation Medal with Combat "V"	Second Nicaraguan Campaign Medal	Yangtze Service Medal
3rd Row	American Defense Service Medal with Fleet Clasp	American Campaign Medal	Asiatic-Pacific Campaign Medal with four 3/16 inch bronze service stars
4th Row	World War II Victory Medal	National Defense Service Medal with one star	Korean Service Medal with one 3/16 inch bronze service star
5th Row	United Nations Korea Medal	Commander of the Order of Naval Merit (Brazil)	Inter-American Defense Board Medal
Submarine Combat Patrol insignia
