= Francis M. McAlister =

U.S. Marine Corps Major General (1905–1965)

Francis Marion McAlister
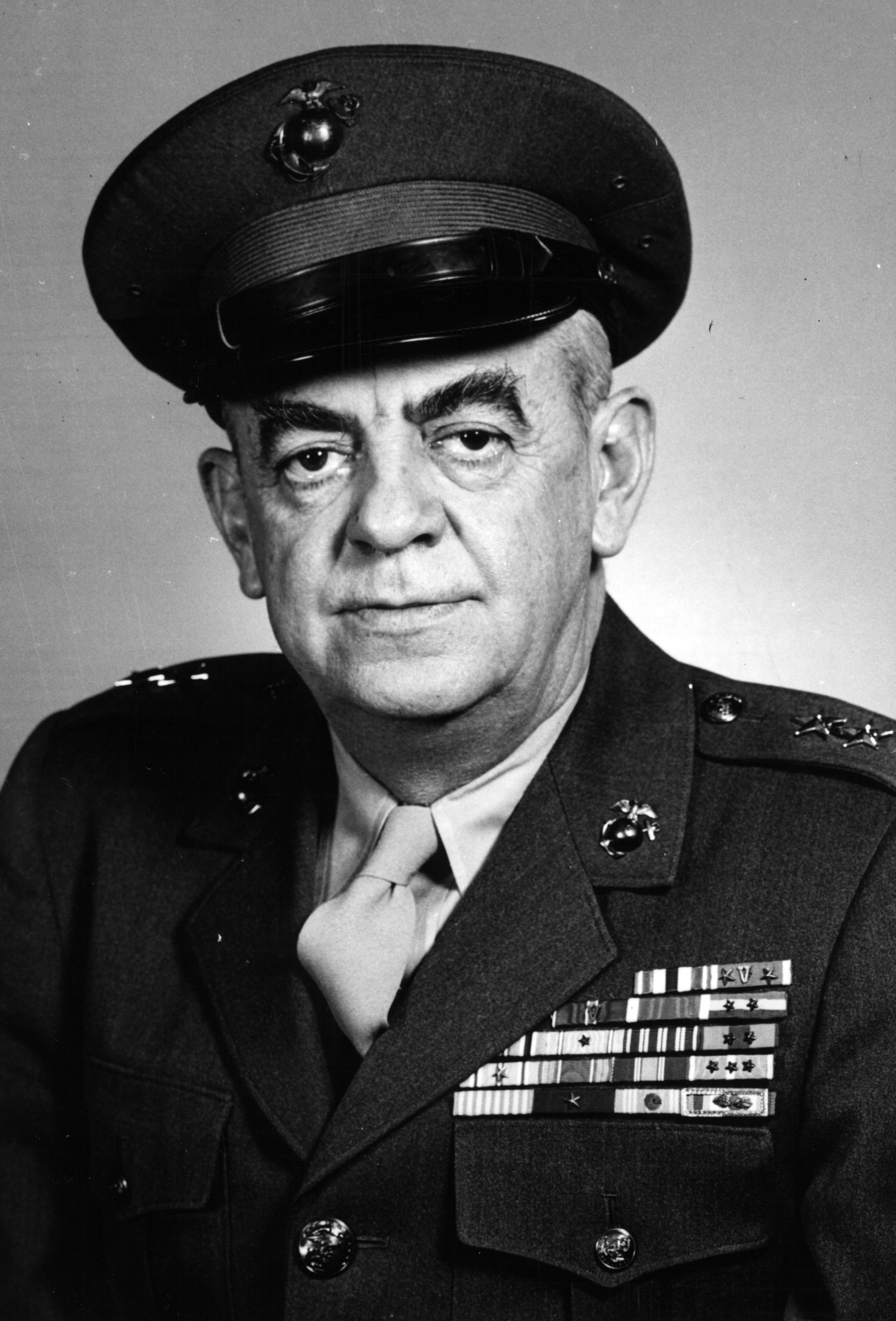
- MG Francis M. McAlister, USMC
- Born: March 29, 1905; Houck, Arizona, US
- Died: September 2, 1965 (aged 60); Blue Mountain, Mississippi, US
- Burial place: Arlington National Cemetery
- Military career
- Allegiance: United States of America
- Branch: United States Marine Corps
- Service years: 1927–1960
- Rank: Major general
- Service number: 0-4264
- Commands: Department of the Pacific; Deputy, Fleet Marine Force, Pacific; 3rd Marine Division; 1st Marine Regiment
- Conflicts: Nicaraguan Campaign; Yangtze Patrol; World War II: Attack on Pearl Harbor; Bougainville Campaign; Recapture of Guam; Battle of Peleliu; Battle of Okinawa; Korean War: Battle of Inchon; Second Battle of Seoul; Battle of Chosin Reservoir; Battles of Wonju
- Awards: Silver Star; Legion of Merit (3); Bronze Star Medal; Purple Heart

Francis Marion McAlister (March 29, 1905 – September 2, 1965) was a highly decorated officer of the United States Marine Corps with the rank of major general. He distinguished himself several times during World War II and later received the Silver Star for gallantry in action in Korean War. McAlister concluded his career as commanding general of Department of the Pacific.

== Early career ==
Francis M. McAlister was born on March 29, 1905, at Houck, Arizona, but his family later moved to Mississippi. He attended Mississippi Heights Academy at Blue Mountain and following graduation in 1922, he spent a year at Mississippi State College, before he entered the United States Naval Academy at Annapolis, Maryland.

Following the four years of studies, McAlister graduated on June 2, 1927, and was commissioned a second lieutenant in the Marine Corps on the same date. Many of his classmates became general officers later: George W. Anderson, Jr., Glynn R. Donaho, John C. Munn, Herbert D. Riley, Alan Shapley, John Thach, Clarence E. Coffin, Samuel H. Crittenden Jr., Marion L. Dawson, Timothy F. Donohue, Thomas J. Hamilton, Herbert L. Hoerner, William P. Chilton, Alexander M. Kowalzyk, William L. Knickerbocker, Leland R. Lampman, William H. Leahy, William F. Royall, Willard A. Saunders, Brooke Schumm, Samuel S. Jack, Jack P. Juhan, David F. O'Neill, Henry R. Paige, George H. Potter, Walter L. J. Bayler, Joseph W. Earnshaw, Harold D. Hansen, Archie E. O'Neil, Richard P. Ross Jr., Miles S. Newton and Earl S. Piper.

He was ordered to the Basic School at Philadelphia Navy Yard for his officer training and after finishing the instruction in January 1928, he was assigned to the 11th Marine Regiment under Colonel Robert H. Dunlap at Norfolk, Virginia. His regiment had been recently reactivated and attached to the 2nd Marine Brigade under Brigadier General Logan Feland.

The 2nd Marine Brigade subsequently sailed to Nicaragua and participated in the operations against rebel forces under Augusto César Sandino in the vicinity of Corinto. McAlister distinguished himself and received the Nicaraguan Presidential Medal of Merit with a Diploma from the Government of Nicaragua. The 11th Marines were ordered stateside in August 1929 and subsequently deactivated.

After a brief stay at Marine Corps Base Quantico, McAlister was assigned to the Marine detachment at President Hoover summer camp near Criglersville, Virginia, in September 1929. He remained in this capacity until the end of October 1932, when he received orders for another tour of expeditionary duty.

McAlister was assigned to the 4th Marine Regiment under Colonel Emile P. Moses and sailed for China. While there, he participated in the guard duties at Shanghai International Settlement and was promoted to first lieutenant in November 1933. One month later, McAlister was appointed commander of the Marine detachment aboard the gunboat USS Asheville. This vessel had already served within Special Service Squadron, Asiatic Fleet in the Chinese waters and was tasked with the "protection of American lives and property".

He finally returned stateside in June 1935, when he was assigned to the Marine Corps Base Quantico, Virginia. McAlister received a promotion to captain in July 1936 and remained in Quantico until he was transferred to the Headquarters Marine Corps in Washington, D.C., in July 1937. While there, he served with the War Plans Section until July 1940.

== World War II ==
McAlister subsequently embarked for Hawaii and following his promotion to major in July 1941, he was appointed commanding officer of the Marine barracks at Naval Ammunition Depot, Oahu. He served in this capacity when the Japanese attacked Pearl Harbor on December 7, 1941. He returned stateside during the summer 1942 and following the activation of the I Marine Amphibious Corps (I MAC) under Major General Clayton B. Vogel at San Diego, California, at the beginning of October 1942, he was appointed Corps Engineer Officer. Meanwhile, he was promoted to the rank of lieutenant colonel in August 1942.

He sailed with that command to the South Pacific Area in October 1942 and after a brief stay at Hawaii and later at New Caledonia, he took part in the fighting in Southern Solomons, Bougainville and New Georgia. For his service in this capacity, McAlister was decorated with the Legion of Merit with Combat "V". When I MAC was redesignated the III Marine Amphibious Corps in April 1944 under Major General Roy Geiger, he served in the same capacity as with I MAC.

During the Battle of Guam in July 1944, he commanded all engineer units and distinguished himself again and was decorated with his second Legion of Merit. McAlister later took part in the Peleliu Operation in September 1944 and after high casualties suffered in this operation, units of the III MAC was sent to Russell Islands for rest and refit.

His command was designated the leading force of all Marine ground units for the upcoming Battle of Okinawa at the beginning of April 1945. McAlister took part in the planning phase and skillfully combined engineer units of the Army, Navy and Marine Corps into an effective engineer group. He later went ashore and personally directed the construction of the bridges and roads despite adverse weather conditions. His units also participated in defusing land mines placed by the Japanese defenders. For his service on Okinawa, McAlister received a Bronze Star Medal with Combat "V" and a Navy Presidential Unit Citation.

== Korean War ==
Colonel McAlister returned to the United States in July 1945 and served for the next two years as officer in charge of Engineer Supply Division, Marine Corps Depot of Supplies, at San Francisco under Brigadier General Arnold W. Jacobsen. He subsequently attended the logistics course at the Command and General Staff College at Fort Leavenworth, Kansas, and later the senior course at the Naval War College in Newport, Rhode Island. He completed all courses in August 1949 and assumed duties as assistant chief of staff for logistics at Camp Pendleton under the command of Major General Graves B. Erskine.

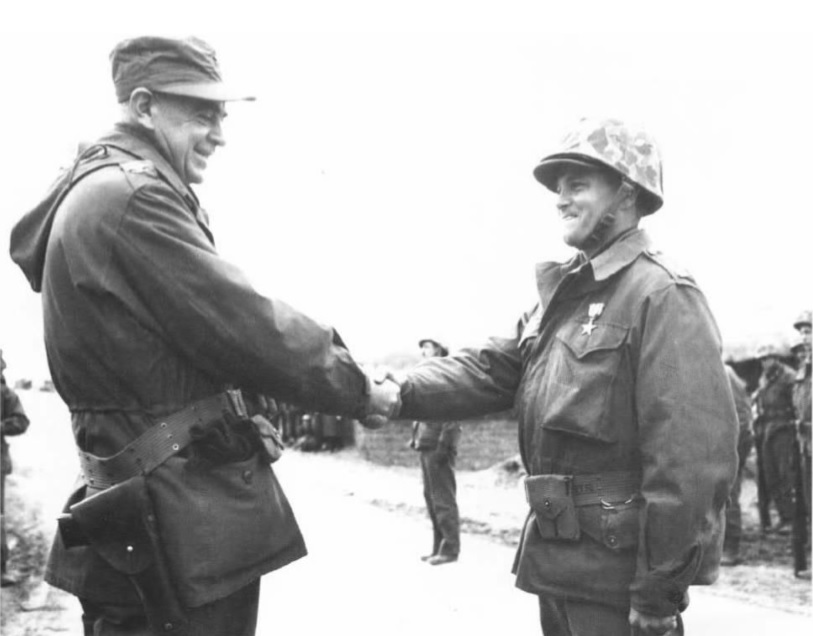
LTC Donald M. Schmuck receiving Silver Star from Colonel Francis M. McAlister for his service with 1st Battalion, 1st Marines at Chinhung-ni from November 26-December 11, 1950.

He was attached to the staff of 1st Marine Division under Major General Oliver P. Smith in July 1950 and sailed for Korea as assistant chief of staff for logistics. McAlister participated in the Inchon Landing at the beginning of September. Thank to his efforts, he organized and capably developed the G-4 section into a smoothly functioning and highly efficient organization. Constantly alert and aggressive, he provided the commanding general with accurate information on the extent of logistical support that could be given to any proposed tactical course of action and made sound recommendations concerning necessary decisions regarding supply, thereby contributing essentially to the success achieved by his division in operations against the enemy. McAlister also took part in the Second Battle of Seoul at the end of September of the same year and later the Battle of Chosin Reservoir.

At the end of January 1951, McAlister was attached to the 1st Marine Regiment, where he relieved its commanding officer, Chesty Puller, who was promoted to general and appointed assistant division commander. The Chinese Army launched a series of counterattacks in the vicinity of Horseshoe Ridge and Hill 902 and advanced toward the town of Yangdongwon-ni. 1st Marines, under McAlister's command, took defensive positions and during the fierce fighting over a vital bridge in the area, McAlister was wounded by enemy mortar fire. However, he refused evacuation and continued to lead his men until the numerically superior enemy forces were repulsed.

McAlister received basic treatment and remained in command of the regiment until May 1951, when he was relieved by Colonel Wilburt S. Brown. For his gallantry in action while with 1st Marines, he was decorated with the Silver Star. McAlister also received the Purple Heart for his wounds and another two Navy Presidential Unit Citations.

== Later career ==
Upon his return to the United States in June 1951, McAlister was appointed President of the Marine Corps Equipment Board with the seat at Quantico, Virginia. His job was to consider whether new equipment for the Marines would be approved for use or not. After almost two years of service in this capacity, McAlister was ordered to Hawaii in April 1953, where he was appointed chief of staff, Fleet Marine Force, Pacific under Lieutenant General Franklin A. Hart. While in this capacity, he was promoted to the rank of brigadier general in March 1954.

For his new rank, he was ordered to Washington, D.C., in August 1954 and attached to the Headquarters Marine Corps as assistant chief of staff for logistics under General Lemuel C. Shepherd. McAlister was promoted to the rank of major general in January 1956.

McAlister subsequently relieved Major General Alan Shapley as commanding general of the 3rd Marine Division stationed at Camp Courtney, Okinawa, at the beginning of July 1957 and commanded the division during the defense duties of the Far Eastern area until the end of March 1958, when he was relieved by Major General David M. Shoup.

He then served as deputy commander, Fleet Marine Force, Pacific, at Hawaii under Lieutenant General Vernon E. Megee, before transferring to San Francisco at the beginning of January 1960. McAlister assumed his final duties when he was appointed commanding general of Department of the Pacific. He only oversaw the already decided deactivation of the command, which finished at the beginning of July 1960 and its responsibilities were transferred to Fleet Marine Force, Pacific and Headquarters Marine Corps.

Major General Francis M. McAlister subsequently retired from the Marine Corps, after 33 years of commissioned service and settled in Blue Mountain, Mississippi. He died there on September 2, 1965, and is buried at Arlington National Cemetery in Virginia.

== Decorations ==
Here is the ribbon bar of Major General Francis M. McAlister:

1st Row	Silver Star			
2nd Row	Legion of Merit with two 5/16" Gold Stars and Combat "V"	Bronze Star Medal with Combat "V"	Purple Heart	Navy Presidential Unit Citation with two stars
3rd Row	Marine Corps Expeditionary Medal with two stars	Second Nicaraguan Campaign Medal	American Defense Service Medal with Base Clasp	American Campaign Medal
4th Row	Asiatic-Pacific Campaign Medal with one 3/16 inch Silver service star	World War II Victory Medal	National Defense Service Medal	Korean Service Medal with three 3/16 inch service stars
5th Row	United Nations Korea Medal	Nicaraguan Presidential Medal of Merit with Diploma	Korean Ulchi Medal with Star	Republic of Korea Presidential Unit Citation with two Oak Leaf Clusters

=== Silver Star citation ===
Citation:

The President of the United States of America takes pleasure in presenting the Silver Star to Colonel Francis Marion McAlister (MCSN: 0-4264), United States Marine Corps, for conspicuous gallantry and intrepidity as Commanding Officer of the First Marines, FIRST Marine Division (Reinforced), during operations against enemy aggressor forces in Korea, on 25 April 1951. Assigned the mission of denying the enemy the mountainous terrain covering the approaches to a vital bridge, Colonel McAlister, despite multiple wounds sustained by hostile mortar fire, refused to be evacuated and continued to lead and direct his units until the numerically superior enemy forces were repulsed. By his inspiring and determined leadership, superb tactical ability and heroic devotion to duty in the face of tremendous odds, Colonel McAlister contributed materially to the success of his regiment's mission and upheld the highest traditions of the United States Naval Service.

=== Bronze Star citation ===
Citation:

The President of the United States of America takes pleasure in presenting the Bronze Star Medal with Combat "V" to Colonel Francis Marion McAlister (MCSN: 0-4264), United States Marine Corps, for meritorious service as Corps Engineer and Commanding Officer of the Engineer Group of the Third Amphibious Corps, Fleet Marine Force, during operations against enemy Japanese forces on Okinawa, Ryukyu Islands, from 1 April to 21 June 1945. During the planning phase of the operation, Colonel McAlister skillfully combined engineer units of the Army, Navy, and Marine Corps into a successful hard-working engineer group. After the initial landing when a swiftly-moving front over difficult terrain and a primitive road net called for the maximum engineer effort, he directed his units in constructing bridges and roads despite adverse weather conditions that rendered the roads impassable. During numerous and arduous trips to the front lines, he observed the activities of combat engineers in removing mines and constructing bridges and roads under fire. His courage and devotion to duty were in keeping with the highest traditions of the United States Naval Service.

== See also ==
- Department of the Pacific

Military offices
Preceded by James P. Berkeley	Commanding General of Department of the Pacific; January 1, 1960 - July 1, 1960	Succeeded by Command dissolved
Preceded by Alan Shapley	Commanding General of 3rd Marine Division; July 2, 1957 - March 28, 1958	Succeeded by David M. Shoup
Preceded by Chesty Puller	Commanding Officer of 1st Marine Regiment; January 25, 1951 - May 18, 1951	Succeeded by Wilburt S. Brown
