= Richard P. Ross Jr. =

U.S. Marine Corps Brigadier General (1906–1990)

Richard Potts Ross Jr.
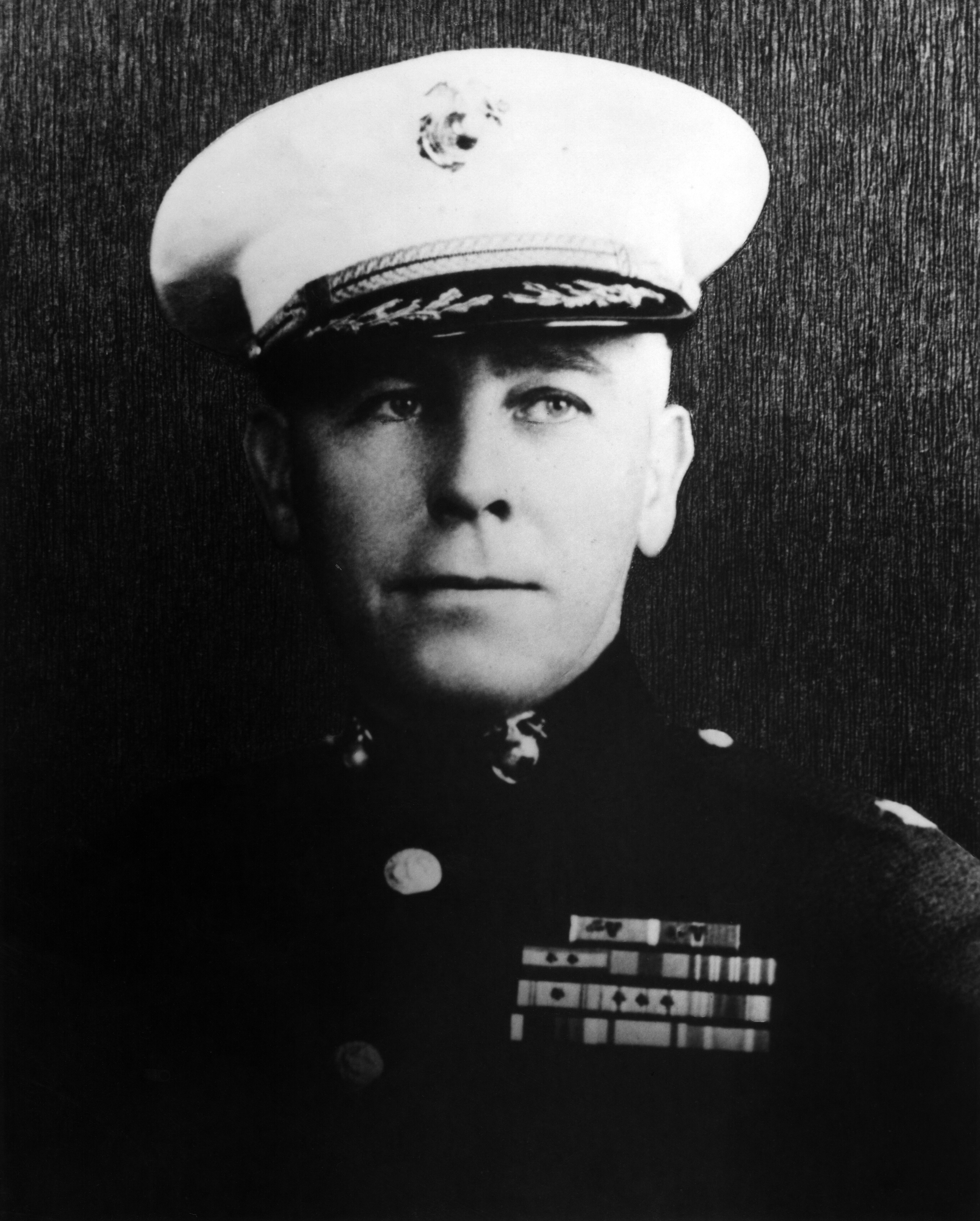
- Ross Jr. as colonel, USMC
- Born: March 18, 1906; Frederick, Maryland, US
- Died: October 6, 1990 (aged 84); Laguna Hills, California, US
- Burial place: Arlington National Cemetery
- Military career
- Allegiance: United States of America
- Branch: United States Marine Corps
- Service years: 1927–1957
- Rank: Brigadier general
- Service number: 0-4276
- Commands: CoS, MCRD San Diego; 7th Marine Regiment; 1st Marine Regiment; 3rd Battalion, 1st Marines; 16th Defense Battalion
- Conflicts: Nicaraguan Campaign; Yangtze Patrol; World War II: Battle of Peleliu; Battle of Okinawa; Chinese Civil War; Korean War
- Awards: Legion of Merit (2); Bronze Star Medal (2)

Richard Potts Ross Jr. (March 18, 1906 – October 6, 1990) was a highly decorated officer of the United States Marine Corps with the rank of brigadier general. He is most noted for his service with the 1st Marine Division during the Battle of Okinawa and later during the Occupation of North China.

== Early years ==
Richard P. Ross was born on March 18, 1906, in Frederick, Maryland, as the son of Richard P. Ross Sr. and attended the Staunton Military Academy in Staunton, Virginia. Following the graduation in summer of 1923, he received appointment to the United States Naval Academy in Annapolis, Maryland, and graduated on June 2, 1927. He was commissioned second lieutenant in the Marine Corps on the same date.

Many of his classmates became general officers later: George W. Anderson, Jr., Glynn R. Donaho, John C. Munn, Herbert D. Riley, Alan Shapley, John Thach, Clarence E. Coffin, Samuel H. Crittenden Jr., Marion L. Dawson, Timothy F. Donohue, Thomas J. Hamilton, Herbert L. Hoerner, William P. Chilton, Alexander M. Kowalzyk, William L. Knickerbocker, Leland R. Lampman, William H. Leahy, William F. Royall, Willard A. Saunders, Brooke Schumm, Francis M. McAlister, Samuel S. Jack, Jack P. Juhan, David F. O'Neill, Henry R. Paige, Walter L. J. Bayler, Joseph W. Earnshaw, Harold D. Hansen, Archie E. O'Neil, Miles S. Newton, George H. Potter and Earl S. Piper.

Ross was subsequently ordered to the Basic School at Philadelphia Navy Yard for further officers' education and completed the school the following summer. Ross then served at Marine Barracks within Naval Station Norfolk, Virginia until 1928, when he left with 2nd Brigade of Marines for expeditionary duty to Nicaragua.

He participated in the jungle patrols against rebels under Augusto César Sandino for several months, before he was ordered to the United States in May 1929. Ross went overseas again in October of that year and served with the Marine detachment at the American Legation in Beiping (Peiping), China, until 1932. Following his return stateside, Ross completed the Company Officers' Course at Marine Corps Schools, Quantico and subsequently served with the Marine Barracks, Washington, D.C. and later with the Marine barracks at Mare Island Naval Shipyard, California.

Upon the promotion to the rank of captain, Ross was appointed commanding officer of the Marine detachment aboard the battleship USS Colorado in August 1935 and spent almost two years with sea duties in Pacific Ocean. He was appointed an instructor in naval ordnance and gunnery at the Naval Academy in June 1937 and remained in that capacity for the next two years. Ross then served as a company commander with 6th Marines in San Diego until the summer of 1941, when he assumed duties as commander of the Marine detachment aboard the battleship USS Oklahoma.

== World War II ==
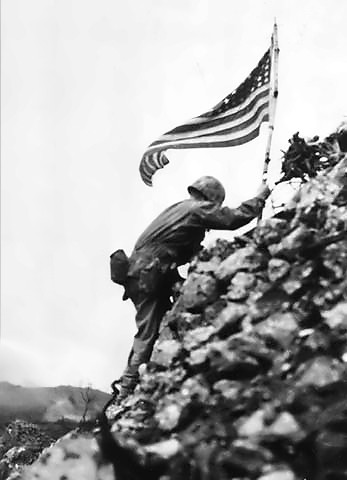
Lt. Col. Ross, commander of 3rd Battalion, 1st Marines braves sniper fire to place the United States' colors over the parapets of Shuri Castle on May 30. This flag was first raised over Cape Gloucester and then Peleliu.

Ross was aboard the Oklahoma during the Japanese attack on Pearl Harbor on December 7, 1941, and took part in the defense of the ship. Following the sinking of the Oklahoma by Japanese planes, he and his detachment were temporarily attached to the Marine barracks within Pearl Harbor Navy Yard until he was ordered for the instruction with a machine gun group of the 3rd Defense Battalion under the command of lieutenant colonel Robert H. Pepper. Ross was promoted to the rank of major in January 1942 and then ordered to the newly activated 10th Defense Battalion under Lieutenant Colonel Robert Blake in June 1942 at San Diego. He was promoted to the rank of lieutenant colonel in September 1942 and served as commanding officer of Special Weapons Group until November of that year, when he was ordered to Johnston Atoll as commanding officer of newly activated 16th Defense Battalion.

His unit consisted of batteries with 5"/51 caliber guns, searchlight and aircraft sound locator and antiaircraft groups with M2 Browning and M1917 Browning machine guns, which were ideal for the defense of the islands from attacks from the sea and air.

Ross was ordered to the States in July 1943 and attached to the Headquarters Marine Corps in Washington, D.C., as operations and training officer, Division of Plans and Policies under Brigadier General DeWitt Peck. He spent almost one year in this capacity, before he was ordered back to the Pacific theater in June 1944 and attached to the 1st Marine Division under Major General William H. Rupertus at Russell Islands.

He succeeded lieutenant colonel Walker A. Reaves as an executive officer of the 1st Marine Regiment under famous Colonel Chesty Puller and supervised the training and preparation of the regiment for upcoming campaign in the Palaus. Ross took part in the bloody battle of Peleliu during the fall of 1944 and received the Bronze Star Medal with Combat "V" and Navy Presidential Unit Citation for his service there. The First Marines suffered heavy casualties during the Peleliu campaign and Ross spent following months with the training of replacements on Pavuvu, Russell Islands. He also held temporary command of 1st Marine Regiment following the departure of Colonel Chesty Puller back to the States from November 4 to December 12, 1944.

In April 1945, Ross took part in the battle of Okinawa and because of the course of the battle, he held temporary command of 1st Battalion, 1st Marines for two days after its commander has been wounded in action and subsequently assumed command of 3rd Battalion, 1st Marines on May 21, 1945. He led his 3rd Battalion during the fierce fighting and his marines took part in several hand-to-hand combats and bayonet charges. Ross and his battalion also fight with lack of food and supplies, but 96th Infantry Division provided rations to his marines.

Ross remained with his unit in the combat area until the end of June 1945 and received the Legion of Merit with Combat "V" for his brilliant leadership during the battle. He also received his second Navy Presidential Unit Citation.

== Later career ==
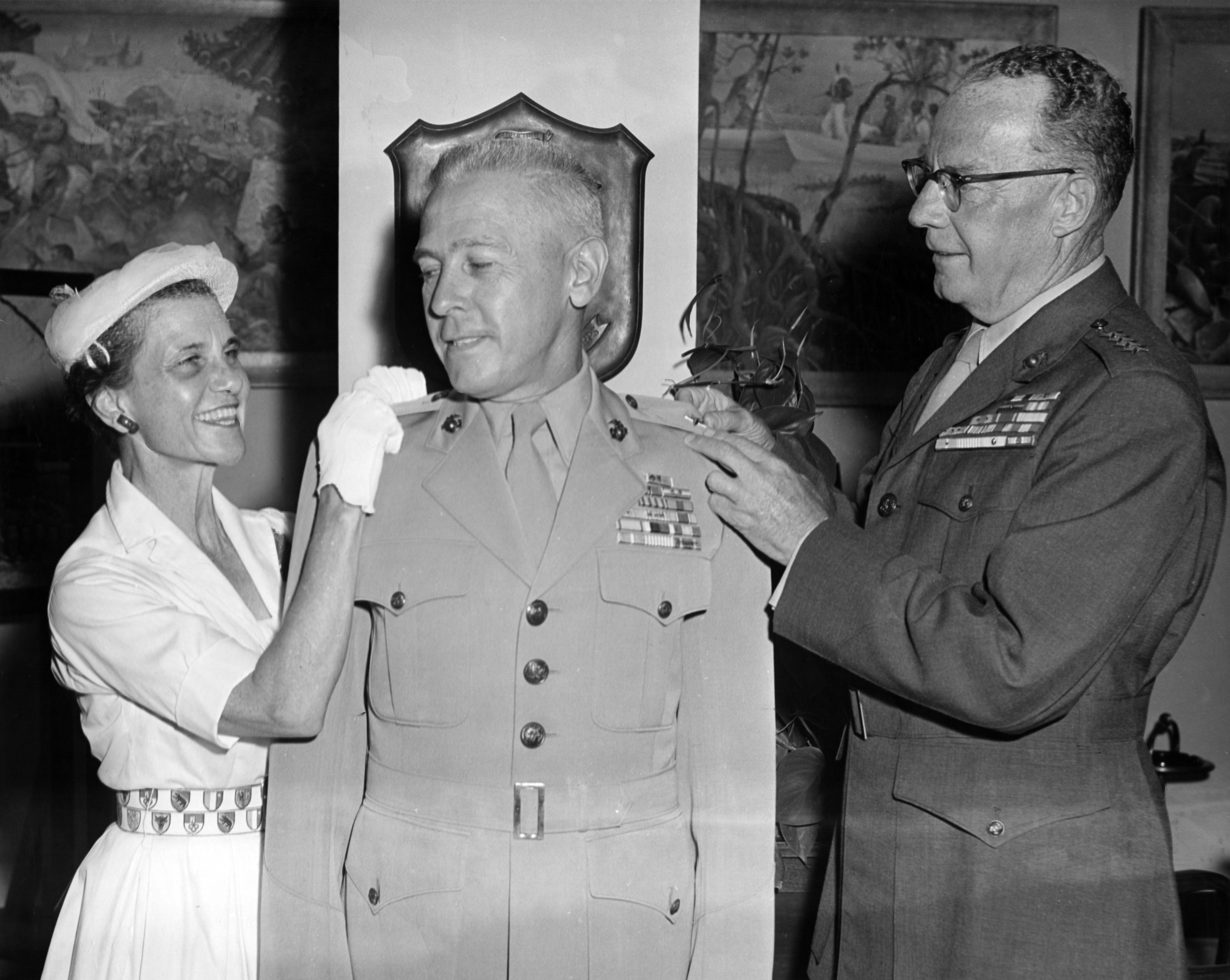
Richard P. Ross Jr. being promoted to the rank of Brigadier General during his retirement ceremony by his wife Catherine and Commandant Randolph M. Pate

Following the Okinawa campaign, the units of 1st Marine Division were preparing for the Invasion of Japan, but formal surrender on September 2, 1945, changed the plans. Ross was promoted to the rank of colonel at the same time and appointed commanding officer of 7th Marine Regiment, 1st Marine Division under his old superior, major general DeWitt Peck. The Seventh Marine Regiment was ordered to Hebei, China in order to accept surrender of Japanese garrisons in Tianjin and prevent the People's Liberation Army from taking over north China, thus helping the Nationalists in the anticipated civil war.

During October 1945, Ross and his regiment were ordered for guard duty of rail line between Tanggu and Qinhuangdao and also for protection of coal mines in Tangshan. Their goal was to make sure, that coal destined for Shanghai moved uninterrupted along the line, but activity of communists guerrilla units increased and marines outposts came under fire at several occasions. Ross participated in the operations against communists guerillas until the end of January 1946, when he was ordered back to the United States. He was decorated with the Legion of Merit by the U.S. Army and his second Bronze Star Medal by the Marines. Ross also received Order of the Cloud and Banner, 5th Class by the Government of Republic of China.

Upon his return stateside, Ross attended Command and General Staff Course at Marine Corps Schools, Quantico and following the graduation, he was ordered to Washington, D.C., for duty with Joint War Plans Committee, Navy Department. He remained in this capacity until summer 1947, when he was ordered for instruction at National War College. Ross graduated one year later and assumed duties as officer in charge of Strategic Plans Section, Headquarters Marine Corps.

In June 1950, Ross was ordered to the Far Eastern Area and appointed commanding officer of Marine Barracks at Naval Base Yokosuka. He served in this capacity during Korean War and was ordered back to the United States in October 1952. He then served as chief of staff, Marine Corps Recruit Depot San Diego under Major General John T. Walker until 1954, when he was appointed Area Staff Representative, Operations Coordinating Board. Ross was appointed to his final assignment in 1955 when he was assigned to the Staff of the Net Evaluation Subcommittee, National Security Council.

Richard P. Ross Jr. retired from active service on June 28, 1957, after 30 years of active service and was advanced to the rank of brigadier general on the retired list for having been specially commended in combat. He then settled in Laguna Hills, California, with his wife, Catherine P. Ross (1909–1993) and died there on October 6, 1990. He was buried at Arlington National Cemetery, Virginia, with full military honors.

== Decorations ==
Here is the ribbon bar of Brigadier General Richard P. Ross Jr.:

1st Row	Legion of Merit with Combat "V" and one Oak leaf cluster		Bronze Star Medal with Combat "V" and one 5/16" Gold Star		Navy Presidential Unit Citation with two stars
2nd Row	Marine Corps Expeditionary Medal	Second Nicaraguan Campaign Medal	American Defense Service Medal with Fleet Clasp	Asiatic-Pacific Campaign Medal with three 3/16 inch service stars	
3rd Row	American Campaign Medal	World War II Victory Medal	Navy Occupation Service Medal	China Service Medal	
4th Row	National Defense Service Medal	Korean Service Medal	United Nations Korea Medal	Order of the Cloud and Banner, 5th Class (Republic of China)	
