= Jack P. Juhan =

U.S. Marine Corps Major General

Jack Phillip Juhan
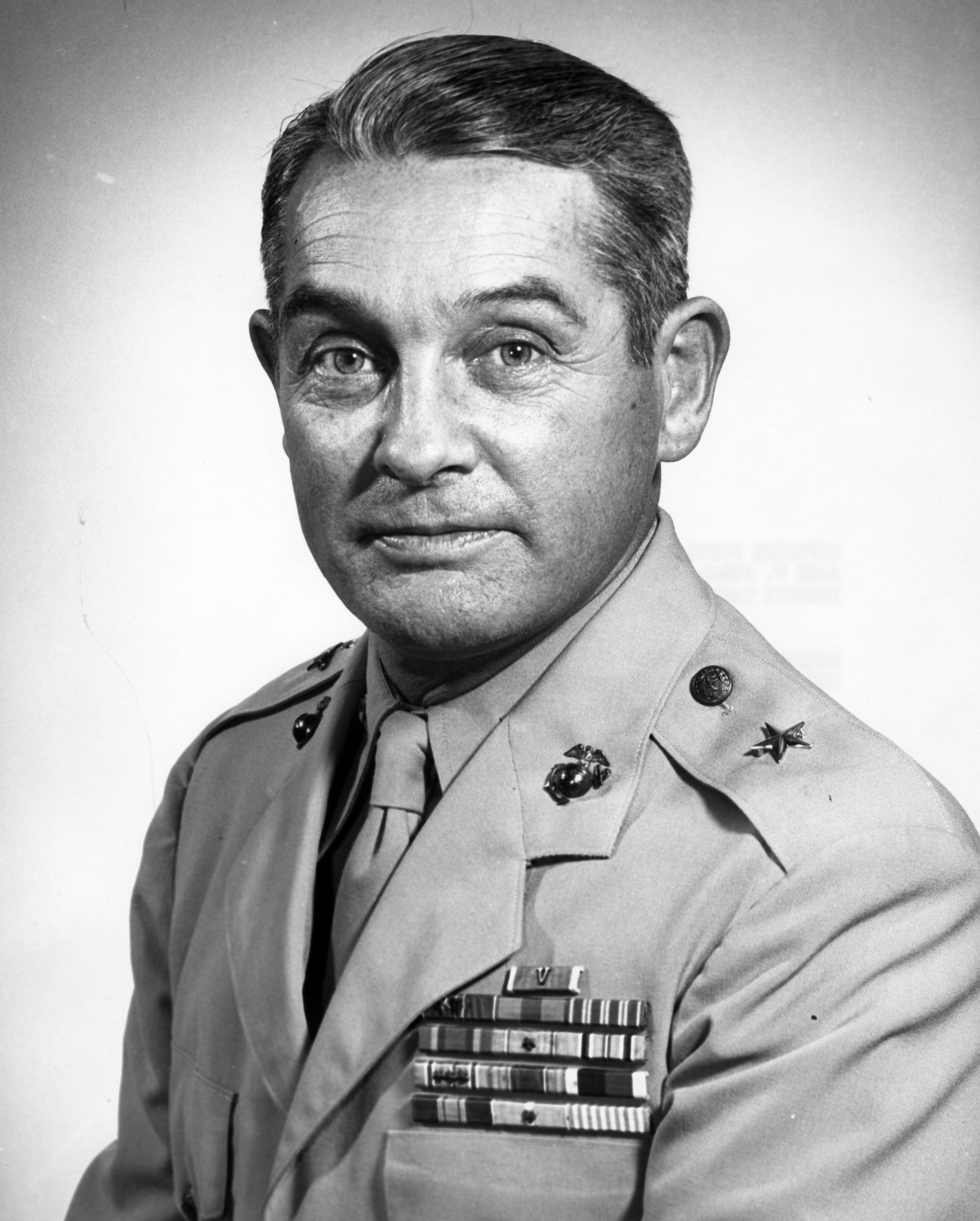
- Juhan as Brigadier General, USMC
- Born: December 28, 1904; Wapanucka, Oklahoma, US
- Died: February 24, 2002 (aged 97); Santa Fe, New Mexico, US
- Burial place: Santa Fe National Cemetery
- Military career
- Allegiance: United States
- Branch: United States Marine Corps
- Service years: 1927–1958
- Rank: Major general
- Service number: 0-4263
- Commands: Force Troops, FMFLANT; CoS of 1st Marine Division; S-2 of 2nd Marine Division; 6th Marine Regiment; 7th Marine Regiment
- Conflicts: Nicaraguan Campaign; Yangtze Patrol; World War II: Battle of Saipan; Battle of Tinian; Battle of Okinawa; Korean War
- Awards: Legion of Merit; Bronze Star Medal (2)

Jack Phillip Juhan (December 28, 1904 – February 24, 2002) was a decorated officer of the United States Marine Corps, who reached the rank of major general. He is most noted for his service as executive officer of 8th Marine Regiment during the Pacific War. Juhan later served as commanding general of the Force Troops, Fleet Marine Force Atlantic and headed UN Personnel and Medical Processing Unit or 7th Marine Regiment during Korean War.

== Early career ==
Jack P. Juhan was born on December 28, 1904, in Wapanucka, Oklahoma, the son of blacksmith Francis Nelson Juhan and his wife Elizabeth. His family moved to Glenwood Springs, Colorado, when he was 13 years old, and young Jack attended the local high school. Following his graduation in 1922, Juhan enrolled at the University of Denver, but after one year, he received an appointment to the United States Naval Academy in Annapolis, Maryland, by U.S. Senator Edward T. Taylor, who was also from Glenwood Springs.

He graduated with the class of 1927 and was commissioned a second lieutenant in the Marine Corps on June 2, 1927. Many of his classmates became general officers later: George W. Anderson, Jr., Glynn R. Donaho, John C. Munn, Herbert D. Riley, Alan Shapley, John Thach, Clarence E. Coffin, Samuel H. Crittenden Jr., Marion L. Dawson, Timothy F. Donohue, Thomas J. Hamilton, Herbert L. Hoerner, William P. Chilton, Alexander M. Kowalzyk, William L. Knickerbocker, Leland R. Lampman, William H. Leahy, William F. Royall, Willard A. Saunders, Brooke Schumm, Francis M. McAlister, Samuel S. Jack, David F. O'Neill, Henry R. Paige, George H. Potter, Walter L. J. Bayler, Joseph W. Earnshaw, Harold D. Hansen, Archie E. O'Neil, Richard P. Ross Jr., Miles S. Newton or Earl S. Piper.

As any other newly commissioned marine officer, Juhan was sent to the Basic School at Philadelphia Navy Yard, where he earned further officer education. He graduated from the school in January 1928 and was assigned to the 11th Marine Regiment under Colonel Robert H. Dunlap. His regiment was subsequently attached to the 2nd Marine Brigade and sailed to Nicaragua to fight rebel forces under Augusto César Sandino. After his arrival, Juhan was stationed in Matagalpa Department and his duty consisted of supervision of the elections, training of Guardia Nacional men and extensive jungle patrolling.

In November 1928, Juhan was ordered back to the United States and subsequently served in Marine Barracks at Quantico, Virginia, and Pensacola, Florida. This peaceful duties were terminated in September, when he was assigned to the 4th Marine Regiment and sailed for another expeditionary duty in Shanghai, China. Juhan served during the emergency there until May 1933 and participated in the defense of the Shanghai International Settlement.

He served aboard the battleship USS Wyoming and later on USS Antares in Cuban waters during the Sergeants' Revolt in September 1933. During the summer of 1935, he took the Junior course in the Marine Corps Schools at Marine Barracks Quantico and following his graduation in June 1936, he was stationed at Marine Barracks within Norfolk Navy Yard. Juhan also completed gunnery training and sea school at Marine Barracks, Washington, D.C. and was subsequently promoted to captain.

Captain Juhan was subsequently appointed commander of the Marine detachment aboard the cruiser USS Vincennes and sailed to Panama Canal and Hawaii, before returning to San Diego. He returned from the sea duties in March 1939 and following the one-month leave, he was appointed aide-de-camp to the commandant of the Marine Corps, Major General Thomas Holcomb.

== World War II ==
At the beginning of June 1941, Major Juhan joined Colonel Julian C. Smith and traveled to Great Britain, where he served as Assistant Naval Attaché and naval observer at the U.S. embassy in London. He witnessed a few German air raids and returned to the United States in September 1941. He was subsequently appointed an instructor at Basic School in Philadelphia Navy Yard and remained in this capacity until July 1942, when he was transferred to a similar position in the Tactical section of the Marine Corps Schools at Marine Barracks Quantico.

This assignment was interrupted in November 1942, when Juhan was assigned to the instruction at Army Infantry School at Fort Benning, Georgia. Upon his graduation in February 1943, he returned to the Marine Corps Schools at Quantico and was appointed Assistant Chief of Operations and Training section. Juhan was later promoted to the rank of lieutenant colonel and appointed commanding officer of the Training battalion there.

Juhan was finally ordered overseas in February 1944, when he was appointed executive officer of the 8th Marine Regiment, under Colonel Clarence R. Wallace. However, the 8th Marines were transferred for rest and refit to Hawaii after heavy fighting in the Battle of Tarawa. Juhan oversaw the regiment during the training for their next campaign in Pacific: the Battle of Saipan.

The 8th Marines arrived there on morning of June 15, 1944 and participated in the initial landing. Shortly before the end of the battle, Lieutenant Colonel Rathvon M. Tompkins, the commanding officer of the 1st Battalion, 29th Marine Regiment, was wounded by enemy fire on July 2, 1944. Juhan became temporary commander of the battalion and distinguished himself during the heavy fighting in the next two days. For his service in this capacity, he was decorated with the Bronze Star Medal with Combat "V".

On July 4, Juhan was relieved by Major William W. McKinley and returned to the 8th Marine Regiment as executive officer. He participated in the subsequent landing on Tinian at the end of July 1944 and following his promotion to the rank of colonel, he was appointed an Intelligence officer (S-2) of the 2nd Marine Division under Major General Thomas E. Watson.

Colonel Juhan conducted intelligence work for 2nd Division units during the Battle of Okinawa in April 1945, but did not go ashore. For his service during the Saipan and Tinian campaigns and later on the staff of the 2nd Marine Division, he received the Legion of Merit with Combat "V".

== Later career ==
Juhan remained on the staff of the 2nd Marine Division until the end of October 1945, when he relieved Colonel Gregon A. Williams as commanding officer of the 6th Marine Regiment. The 6th Marines were already in Japan and served as occupation forces. Juhan was relieved by Colonel James P. Berkeley, ordered back to the United States in February 1946 and assigned to Chicago, where he was appointed officer in charge of the Central Recruiting Division. The recruiting duties ended in September 1946, and Juhan was ordered to Washington, D.C., where he was assigned to the Personnel Department at Headquarters Marine Corps. There he served as officer in charge of the Officer Procurement Section until August 1947 and then was appointed Chief of the Records branch.

In August 1948, Juhan was assigned to the course at National War College and after graduating in June 1949, he was selected for the important job at United Nations Military Staff Committee in New York of deputy and chief of staff to the United States Naval Representative.

He remained in that capacity for next two years and in June 1951, he was transferred back to Washington, D.C., to take command of the Marine barracks at Washington Navy Yard. Juhan also simultaneously served as director of the Marine Corps Institute located there. However, he left this capacity in June 1953, when he was appointed commander of the United Nations Personnel and Medical Processing Unit in Korea. He was responsible for the exchange of the prisoners of war and also for the clothing issue, security, food, communication, motor transport and the operation of the unit headquarters.

Juhan was appointed commanding officer of the 7th Marine Regiment in August 1953, but following the Armistice, he participated only in the defense of the Korean Demilitarized Zone and was finally succeeded by Colonel Wendell H. Duplantis in December 1953. However, he stayed in Korea and was appointed Chief of Staff of the 1st Marine Division under Major General Randolph M. Pate. For his service in Korea, Juhan received his second Bronze Star Medal with Combat "V" and also the Order of Military Merit, Eulji Medal with Silver Star by the Government of South Korea.

Upon his return stateside in April 1954, Juhan was appointed deputy chief of staff of Department of the Pacific under Major General Ray A. Robinson, with the headquarters in San Francisco, California. However Juhan returned to Camp Lejeune soon after and was assigned to the president of the Joint Landing Force Board as his deputy. While served in this capacity, he was promoted to the rank of brigadier general in August 1954. In February 1955, he succeeded Brigadier General Edward W. Snedeker as assistant division commander of the 2nd Marine Division, located there, and remained in this capacity just until the beginning of July of that year.

His next important assignment was as commanding general Force Troops, Fleet Marine Force Atlantic (FMFLANT). In this capacity, he was responsible for all independent units under FMFLANT such as support artillery units, antiaircraft artillery units, military police battalions, separate engineer units and other miscellaneous force units of the Fleet Marine Force, Atlantic.

Juhan was succeeded by Brigadier General Sidney S. Wade in July 1957 and concluded his career as Deputy Base Commander, Camp Pendleton under Major General Reginald H. Ridgely Jr. and finally retired from the Marine Corps in July of the following year. He was advanced to the rank of major general for having been specially commended in combat.

== Retirement ==
Following his retirement, Jack Juhan resided in Santa Fe, New Mexico, and worked as executive director of the United Way of Santa Fe County and later as director of Santa Fe Ski Basin. He was also active in the Veterans of Foreign Wars organization and the Military Order of the World Wars and was member of the Santa Fe Rotary Club.

== Decorations ==
Here is the ribbon bar of Major General Jack P. Juhan:

1st Row	Legion of Merit with Combat "V"	Bronze Star Medal with Combat "V" and one 5/16" Gold Star	Navy Unit Commendation	Marine Corps Expeditionary Medal
2nd Row	Yangtze Service Medal	Second Nicaraguan Campaign Medal	American Defense Service Medal with Fleet Clasp	American Campaign Medal
3rd Row	Asiatic-Pacific Campaign Medal with three 3/16 inch service stars	World War II Victory Medal	Navy Occupation Service Medal	National Defense Service Medal
4th Row	Korean Service Medal with one 3/16 inch service stars	United Nations Korea Medal	Republic of Korea Presidential Unit Citation	Order of Military Merit, Eulji Medal with Silver Star

Military offices
Preceded by Francis B. Loomis Jr.	Commanding General of the Force Troops, Fleet Marine Force Atlantic; July 1955 - July 1957	Succeeded by Sidney S. Wade
Preceded by Gregon A. Williams	Commanding Officer of the 6th Marine Regiment; 6 November 1945 – 24 January 1946	Succeeded by James P. Berkeley
