= Herbert D. Riley =

United States Navy admiral

Herbert Douglas Riley
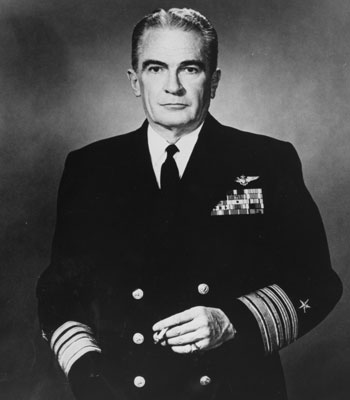
- Born: December 24, 1904; Baltimore, Maryland, US
- Died: January 17, 1973 (aged 68); Kent Island, Maryland, US
- Burial place: United States Naval Academy Cemetery, Annapolis, Maryland
- Relatives: ADM John H. Towers (father-in-law)
- Military career
- Allegiance: United States
- Branch: United States Navy
- Service years: 1927–1964
- Rank: Vice admiral
- Nickname: "Pat" or "Herb"
- Commands: Director of the Joint Staff; Carrier Division One; USS Makassar Strait (CVE-91); USS Coral Sea (CVA-43)
- Conflicts: World War II; Pacific War; Guadalcanal campaign; Battle of Iwo Jima; Okinawa campaign; Cold War; Cuban Missile Crisis
- Awards: Distinguished Service Medal; Distinguished Flying Cross; Bronze Star Medal

Herbert Douglas Riley (December 24, 1904 – January 17, 1973) was a highly decorated officer in the United States Navy with the rank of Vice admiral. A United States Naval Academy graduate, he trained as naval aviator and distinguished himself first as commanding officer of the escort carrier USS Makassar Strait during the combats at Iwo Jima and Okinawa during World War II.

Following the War, he rose to the flag rank and held important staff assignments as Deputy Chief of Naval Operations for Operations and Readiness and later as Director of the Joint Staff during Cuban Missile Crisis. Riley was a son-in-law of Admiral John H. Towers, pioneer naval aviator and later-Commander-in-Chief, United States Pacific Fleet.

== Naval career ==
=== Early career ===
Herbert D. Riley was born on December 24, 1904, in Baltimore, Maryland, the son of Marion and Sarah Riley. He attended the Baltimore Polytechnic Institute and received an appointment to the United States Naval Academy in Annapolis, Maryland, in May 1923. While at the Academy, Riley was active in lacrosse and served was on the editorial staff of the Lucky Bag. He was nicknamed "Herb" or "Pat".

Many of his classmates became general officers later including George W. Anderson, Jr., Glynn R. Donaho, John C. Munn, Alan Shapley, John Thach, Clarence E. Coffin, Samuel H. Crittenden Jr., Marion L. Dawson, Timothy F. Donohue, Thomas J. Hamilton, Herbert L. Hoerner, William P. Chilton, Alexander M. Kowalzyk, William L. Knickerbocker, Leland R. Lampman, William H. Leahy, William F. Royall, Willard A. Saunders, Brooke Schumm, Francis M. McAlister, Samuel S. Jack, Jack P. Juhan, David F. O'Neill, Henry R. Paige, Richard P. Ross Jr., Walter L. J. Bayler, Joseph W. Earnshaw, Harold D. Hansen, Archie E. O'Neil, Miles S. Newton, George H. Potter and Earl S. Piper.

Riley graduated with Bachelor of Science on June 2, 1927, and was commissioned ensign in the United States Navy on the same date. He was attached to the battleship USS New Mexico two months later and participated in the patrol cruises with the Pacific Fleet before he was ordered to Naval Air Station Pensacola, Florida for flight training in September 1929.

Upon the completion of the training, Riley was designated naval aviator on September 3, 1930, and was attached to the Scouting Squadron Six (VS-6), Aircraft Squadrons, Scouting Fleet. While he underwent training, he was promoted to lieutenant (junior grade) on June 2, 1930, and also completed correspondence course in optics at the Naval War College. Riley then served with the Scouting Squadron Five (VS-5) until June 1933, when he was transferred to the Patrol Squadron One (VP-1) stationed at Pearl Harbor, Territory of Hawaii. In June 1935, Riley was transferred to the Fighting Squadron Three (VF-3) and was promoted to lieutenant on June 30, 1936.

=== Duty in Washington ===
An important milestone of Riley's career was his transfer to the Naval Air Station Anacostia in Washington, D.C. in January 1938. He served as test and transport pilot for government officials and also held additional duty as Naval Aide to President Franklin D. Roosevelt at the White House. While in this capacity, Riley met Marjorie Towers, daughter of Rear Admiral John H. Towers, then-Chief of Bureau of Aeronautics. They were married in the Fort Myer Chapel, Virginia in June 1940.

Riley was shortly thereafter transferred to the staff, Commander, Carrier Division 1 under Rear Admiral Arthur L. Bristol and served as his flag lieutenant and aide and continued in this capacity following Bristol's appointment as Commander, Aircraft Scouting Force of the Atlantic Fleet. Following appointment of Rear Admiral John S. McCain Sr. to command of Aircraft Scouting Force, Riley remained as his aide for several months.

== World War II ==
Following the United States entry into World War II, Riley was promoted to the rank of lieutenant commander on January 1, 1942, and assumed duty as operations officer on the staff of Commander, Fleet Air West Coast, which was responsible for the defense of West Coast of the United States and Alaska. In late 1942, Riley was temporarily attached to the aircraft squadrons operating at Guadalcanal and saw combat duty against Japanese fighter planes.

He subsequently returned to Washington, D.C. and was attached Bureau of Aeronautics, where he headed Plans Division consecutively under rear admirals John S. McCain Sr. and DeWitt C. Ramsey and received Navy Commendation Medal for his service. Riley was ordered to Pearl Harbor, Hawaii in early January 1945 and assumed command of escort carrier USS Makassar Strait. Riley commanded his carrier during the protecting of convoys supporting the frontline Fast Carrier Task Force under his old superior now-Vice admiral John S. McCain Sr. and also provided air screens for the transfer of replacement aircraft to their carriers during the Battle of Iwo Jima.

Upon promotion to the temporary rank of captain on March 20, 1945, Riley's ship provided close air support and bombed Japanese defenses as the marines struggled to fight their way south during the combats at Okinawa in May 1945 and Riley was decorated with Bronze Star Medal with Combat "V". He was transferred to the staff, Commander First Carrier Task Force under Vice Admiral Frederick C. Sherman as operations officer by the end of July 1945. While in this capacity he took part in the occupation of Japan and was appointed Honorary Commander of the Order of the British Empire for his wartime service by the United Kingdom.

== Postwar career ==
Following the War, Riley was attached to the staff of Joint Army-Navy Task Force One under Vice admiral William H. P. Blandy as Deputy Air Commander and took part in the Operation Crossroads, nuclear weapon tests at Bikini Atoll in mid-1946. He was subsequently ordered to Washington, D.C., where he joined the Strategic Plans Section in the office of the Chief of Naval Operations under Admiral Louis E. Denfeld. Riley was later appointed an assistant to United States Secretary of Defense James V. Forrestal and following his death in March 1949, he continued as an assistant to his successor Louis A. Johnson. For his service during the Operation Crossroads, Riley received Distinguished Flying Cross.

Riley entered the National War College in Washington in September 1950 and completed the instruction there one year later. He then served Assistant Chief of Staff for Plans on the staff of Commander-in-Chief, Atlantic Fleet under Admiral Lynde D. McCormick at Norfolk, Virginia until February 1952, when McCormick's command was expanded to Supreme Allied Commander Atlantic as the part of North Atlantic Treaty Organization (NATO), Riley became its Assistant Chief of Staff for Plans, Policy and Operations.

In November 1952, Riley assumed command of attack aircraft carrier USS Coral Sea and participated in the training of pilots in carrier operations off of the Virginia Capes and Mayport, Florida. He sailed for a tour of duty in the Mediterranean in April 1953 and visited Spain, and took part in the NATO Exercise Black Wave with Deputy Secretary of Defense R. M. Kyes on board as an observer.

Riley was detached in August 1953 and assumed duty as Chief of Staff to Commander, Carrier Division Two under Rear Admiral Hugh H. Goodwin. He then took part in the Operation Mariner, Joint Anglo-American exercise which encountered very heavy seas over a two-week period in September that year and joined the International Affairs Division in the office of the Chief of Naval Operations under Admiral Robert Carney.

Following the promotion to rear admiral on August 1, 1955, Riley was appointed Commander, Carrier Division One and commanded this command during the patrol cruises in the Far East. He held that command until February 1958, when he assumed duty as chief of staff for United States Pacific Command, serving on Hawaii consecutively under Admiral Felix B. Stump and his successor, Admiral Harry D. Felt until May 1961.

Riley was promoted to vice admiral on February 9, 1958, and assumed duty as Deputy Chief of Naval Operations for Operations and Readiness in Washington, D.C., in December 1960. He served in this capacity until February 1962, when he assumed his final duty as Director of the Joint Staff for the Joint Chiefs of Staff under General Maxwell D. Taylor at the Pentagon. Riley served in this capacity during the Cuban Missile Crisis in October 1962 and received Navy Distinguished Service Medal at his retirement on February 28, 1964.

== Death ==
Following his retirement, Riley settled at Kent Island, Maryland and was active in the Naval Institute's oral history program. He died at his home on January 17, 1973, aged 68 and was buried with full military honors at the United States Naval Academy Cemetery in Annapolis, Maryland, where his headstone proclaims him to have been a "ninth-generation Marylander." Riley had two children, a son Herbert Jr., who died only one day after his birth in 1941 and a daughter Lynn Lovelace Riley who died October 21, 2021.

== Awards and decorations ==
Here is the ribbon bar of Vice admiral Riley:

Naval Aviator Badge
1st Row	Navy Distinguished Service Medal		
2nd Row	Distinguished Flying Cross	Bronze Star Medal with Combat "V"	Navy Commendation Medal
3rd Row	Army Commendation Medal with Oak Leaf Cluster	American Defense Service Medal	American Campaign Medal
4th Row	Asiatic-Pacific Campaign Medal with three 3/16 inch service stars	World War II Victory Medal	Navy Occupation Service Medal
5th Row	National Defense Service Medal with one star	Honorary Commander of the Order of the British Empire	Peruvian Aviation Cross, 1st Class

== Notes ==
Military offices
Preceded by Earle G. Wheeler	Director of the Joint Staff; February 25, 1962 - February 23, 1964	Succeeded by David A. Burchinal
