= Henry R. Paige =

U.S. Marine Corps Major General

Henry Reid Paige
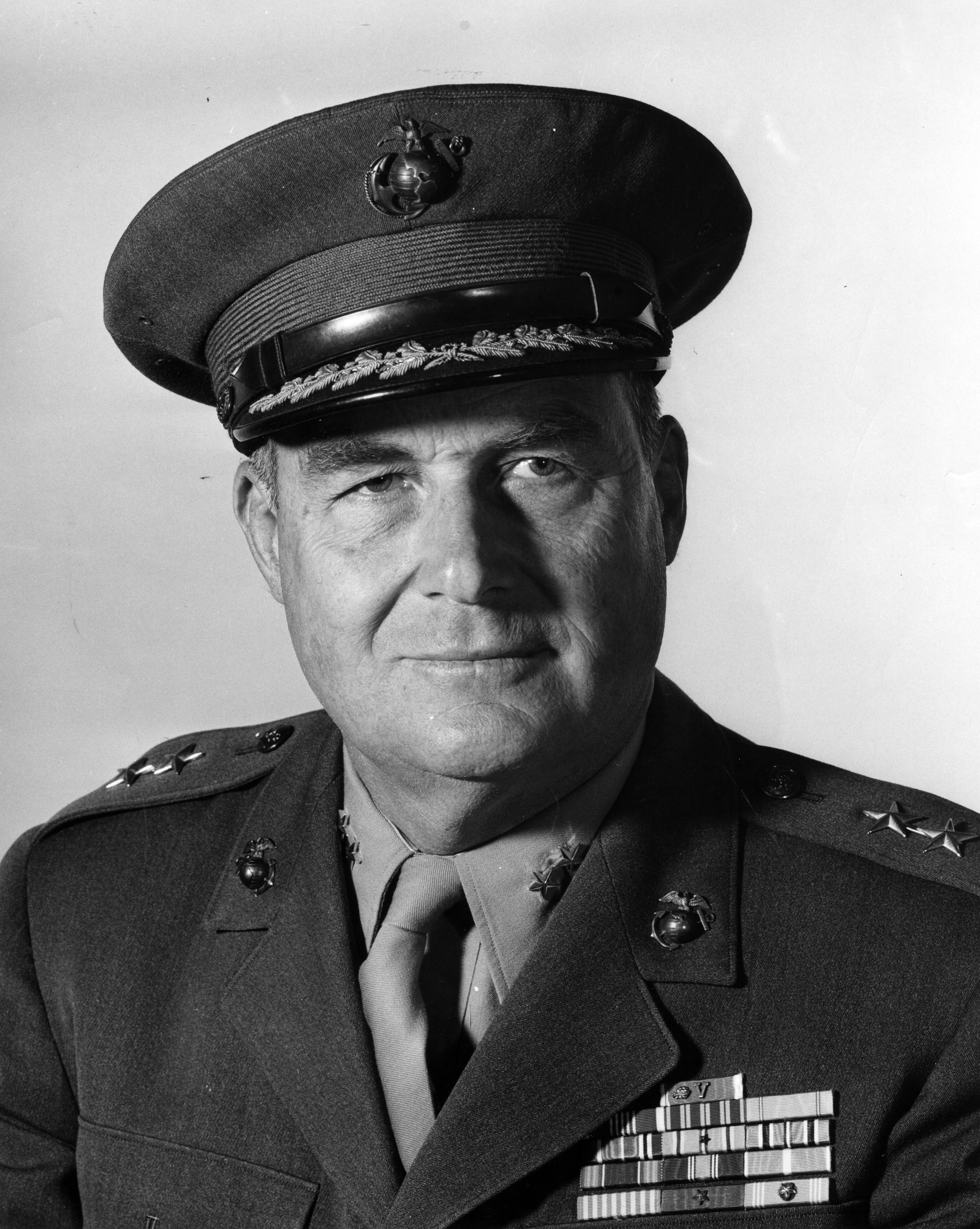
- MG Henry R. Paige, USMC
- Born: March 30, 1904; Ogdensburg, New York
- Died: April 22, 1989 (aged 85); Carlsbad, California
- Burial place: Eternal Hills Memorial Park, San Diego
- Military career
- Allegiance: United States of America
- Branch: United States Marine Corps
- Service years: 1927–1961
- Rank: Major general
- Nickname: "Hank"
- Service number: 0-4255
- Commands: Marine Corps Base Quantico; 1st Marine Division; 1st Prov AAA Group; 7th Defense Battalion
- Conflicts: Nicaraguan Campaign; World War II: Occupation of Iceland; Palau Islands Campaign; Korean War
- Awards: Legion of Merit (2); Army Commendation Medal

Henry Reid Paige (March 30, 1904 – April 22, 1989) was a decorated officer of the United States Marine Corps with the rank of major general. He is most noted for his service as commanding officer of 7th Defense Battalion during Palau Islands Campaign and later as commanding general of 1st Marine Division or as director of Marine Corps Educational Center at Marine Corps Base Quantico. He also served as temporary base commander in summer 1956.

== Early years ==
Henry R. Paige was born on March 30, 1904, in Ogdensburg, New York, as oldest child of Alfred Smith Paige and his wife Ella May Reed Paige. Paige's family operated local brickyard, which was established by Henry's great-grandfather sometimes in the first half of 19th century. Young Hank also worked there and earned his first money. He was later sent to the Ogdensburg Free Academy and following the graduation in 1922, he enrolled the St. Lawrence University in Canton, New York.

While at university, Paige affiliated with Delta Tau Phi fraternity and met there his future wife, Gladys Mary Louise Brundage. They married in July 1927. However Paige completed only one year at St. Lawrence, because in 1923 he received desired appointed to the United States Naval Academy at Annapolis, Maryland. During his time at the academy, Paige competed in track, crew and football. During one football game, Hank fractured his leg and spent a half year in hospital. He graduated on June 2, 1927, with a bachelor's degree and was commissioned second lieutenant in the Marine Corps on the same date. Many of his classmates became general officers later: George W. Anderson, Jr., Glynn R. Donaho, John C. Munn, Herbert D. Riley, Alan Shapley, John Thach, Clarence E. Coffin, Samuel H. Crittenden Jr., Marion L. Dawson, Timothy F. Donohue, Thomas J. Hamilton, Herbert L. Hoerner, William P. Chilton, Alexander M. Kowalzyk, William L. Knickerbocker, Leland R. Lampman, William H. Leahy, William F. Royall, Willard A. Saunders, Brooke Schumm, Francis M. McAlister, Samuel S. Jack, Jack P. Juhan, David F. O'Neill, George H. Potter, Walter L. J. Bayler, Joseph W. Earnshaw, Harold D. Hansen, Archie E. O'Neil, Richard P. Ross Jr., Miles S. Newton or Earl S. Piper.

Following his graduation, Paige was ordered to the Basic School at Philadelphia Navy Yard for further officer training. He completed the course in February 1928 and returned to Annapolis for tryouts in connection with 1928 Summer Olympics. During the try-out, he made it to the final in the hammer throw, but did not qualify.

Paige was transferred to the Marine Barracks, Washington, D.C. in September 1928 and remained there until January 1929, when he was attached to the 2nd Marine Brigade under Brigadier General Logan Feland and ordered to Nicaragua. He then took part in the jungle patrols and operations against rebel bandits under Augusto César Sandino. During his time in Caribbean, he was infected with Malaria twice, but recovered soon thereafter and resumed his duties. Paige was decorated with Nicaraguan Presidential Medal of Merit with Diploma for his service in connection with anti-bandits operations.

Upon his return to the States in August 1930, Paige was attached to the Marine Barracks Parris Island, South Carolina until January 1932. Paige then returned to the Naval Academy as an instructor in the physical training department. He remained there only one semester and subsequently attended an antiaircraft direction school at the Ford Instrument Company at Long Island, New York.

His first sea duties came in October 1932, when was attached to the Marine detachment aboard the heavy cruiser USS Indianapolis. Paige was given a great honor, when President Franklin D. Roosevelt made his first presidential trip aboard that vessel. Roosevelt sailed from his summer house at Campobello Island to Annapolis, Maryland. Paige was also presented to the President and had opportunity to speak with him about Ogdensburg and the Roosevelts' many friends here and in St. Lawrence County.

Paige was promoted to the rank of first lieutenant in September 1933 and left "Indy" in November of that year. He then served briefly at Norfolk Navy Yard, before assumed command of the Marine detachment aboard the battleship USS Idaho in January 1934. The Idaho was undergoing a major reconstruction at Norfolk, and ship remained there until October of that year. Meanwhile, Paige was promoted to the rank of captain in July 1934 and left Idaho one month later.

Paige was subsequently transferred to Marine Corps Base Quantico, Virginia, and attached to the 10th Marine Artillery Regiment there. He took part in the fleet exercise in Culebra, Puerto Rico, in 1935 and subsequently went to the staff of Marine Corps Schools, Quantico, as an instructor in August 1936. Paige served briefly as an instructor within the Platoon Leaders Class, before attending the Junior Course there in May 1937.

He then served with the Marine barracks on Guam and participated in the planning of airstrips and air bases there until August 1939.

== World War II ==
Following his return to the States in August 1939, Paige was attached to the newly activated 3rd Defense Battalion under Lieutenant Colonel Robert H. Pepper at Parris Island. Paige served as Battery commander and helped with the activation of 4th and 5th Defense Battalions. He remained with 5th Defense Battalion as Battery commander and following the promotion to the rank of major in May 1941, he was appointed Commander of Three Inch Antiaircraft Group of his battalion.

Paige sailed with his unit for Iceland and took part in its occupation until March 1942. While in Iceland his unit was reviewed by Prime Minister of the United Kingdom, Winston Churchill, who stopped over after a conference with President Franklin D. Roosevelt in Nova Scotia, Canada.

The 5th Defense battalion was ordered back to the States in March 1942 and Paige was transferred to the staff of Marine Corps Schools, Quantico one month later. He served under Brigadier General Samuel M. Harrington as director of the Artillery course and also received temporary promotion to the rank of lieutenant colonel in August 1942. Paige was transferred to command Artillery battalion within Training center at Camp Lejeune, North Carolina in January 1943 and remained there until November of that year.

Lieutenant Colonel Paige finally sailed for Pacific area in November 1943 and assumed command of the 7th Defense Battalion at Gilbert Islands. Paige led his battalion to Hawaii in April 1944, where it was redesignated 7th Antiaircraft Artillery Battalion. His unit later took part in the Palau Islands Campaign in September 1944 and subsequently deployed to Angaur island as Garrison force. He was promoted to the rank of colonel in October 1944.

In November 1944, Paige was ordered back to Hawaii to organize 1st Provisional Antiaircraft Artillery Group, before he was transferred to the headquarters Fleet Marine Force, Pacific in December of that year. He was appointed Fleet Antiaircraft officer under Lieutenant General Holland M. Smith and remained in that capacity until May 1945. Paige then took command of the 2nd Provisional Antiaircraft Artillery Group on Guam and remained there until October 1945.

For his service in the Pacific area throughout the War, Paige was decorated with the Legion of Merit with Combat "V" by general Holland Smith.

== Later career ==
Colonel Paige was attached to the Supply section at Headquarters Marine Corps in Washington, D.C., and subsequently appointed Technical planner in the Logistics Plan Division, Office of the Chief of Naval Operations under Fleet Admiral Chester W. Nimitz. While in that capacity, Paige served simultaneously with Joint Army and Navy Chemical Warfare Coordination Committee. He was decorated later with Army Commendation Medal for his service with that committee.

In August 1948, Paige was attached to the course at National War College and graduated in July 1949. His next assignment was the capacity of chief of staff with Troop Training Unit, Atlantic Fleet at Little Creek, Virginia, under Brigadier General Robert H. Pepper. In September 1950, Paige was appointed first president of Tactics and Techniques board within Marine Corps Development Center at Quantico, Virginia.

Paige was promoted to the rank of brigadier general in September 1953 and appointed chief of staff, Camp Lejeune. His tenure was a brief and he was attached to 2nd Marine Division as assistant division commander to Major General George F. Good. The 2nd Division underwent intensive training, but did not deployed to Korea.

However Paige was transferred to Korea himself in July 1954 and joined 1st Marine Division under Major General Robert E. Hogaboom as assistant division commander. Although the truce was already in effect for more than year, 1st Marine Division remained in defensive positions along the Korean Demilitarized Zone. During his time in Korea, Paige also served as navy member of the United Nations Military Armistice Commission, which was tasked to supervise the Korean Armistice Agreement. He attended several meetings with the Communists representatives at Panmunjom. He showed great administrative and diplomatic skills and army command decorated him with Legion of Merit. Paige also received Korean Ulchi Medal from the Government of South Korea.

The last units of 1st Marine Division were ordered back to the United States in April 1955 and Paige was transferred to Marine Corps Base Quantico and appointed director of Marine Corps Educational Center located there. While served in this capacity, Paige was involved in the development of helicopters crews. He was promoted to the rank of major general in November 1955. Paige also served as temporary Commander of Marine Corps Base Quantico from July to September 1956. As temporary commander of the Quantico Base, he also served dual capacity as commandant of the Marine Corps Schools, Quantico.

In July 1957, Paige was appointed assistant chief of staff for logistics at Headquarters Marine Corps and remained there until fall 1959. His final assignment came in November of that year, when he was ordered to Camp Pendleton, California, and appointed commanding general of famed 1st Marine Division. During his tenure, over 17,000 Marines were under his command.

== Retirement ==
Major General Henry R. Paige retired from the active service on July 1, 1961, after 34 years of commissioned service. Upon his retirement from the military, he settled in California and served as a director of the Oceanside Chamber of Commerce and the Oceanside United Service Organizations and president of the Oceanside Rotary Club. Paige was also a member of U.S. Naval Academy Alumni Association, the Marine Corps Association, the 1st Marine Division Association and the North County YMCA board. Paige also received honorary doctorate from St. Lawrence University.

He died on April 22, 1989, in his Carlsbad residence, aged 85. His wife Gladys, died just several months later. They are both buried at Eternal Hills Memorial Park, San Diego. They had together four kids: son Reid and daughters: Mary Ellen, Ann, and Shirley.

== Decorations ==
Here is the ribbon bar of Major General Henry R. Paige:

1st Row	Legion of Merit with Combat "V" and Oak Leaf Cluster			
2nd Row	Army Commendation Medal	Second Nicaraguan Campaign Medal	American Defense Service Medal with Base Clasp	European–African–Middle Eastern Campaign Medal
3rd Row	Asiatic-Pacific Campaign Medal with one 3/16 inch service star	American Campaign Medal	World War II Victory Medal	National Defense Service Medal with one service star
4th Row	Korean Service Medal	United Nations Korea Medal	Nicaraguan Presidential Medal of Merit with Diploma	Korean Ulchi Medal with Silver Star

== See also ==
- List of 1st Marine Division Commanders
- Marine defense battalions
- Robert H. Pepper
- Harry K. Pickett

Military offices
Preceded by Thomas F. Riley	Commanding General of 1st Marine Division; November 14, 1959 - June 6, 1961	Succeeded by Frederick E. Leek
Preceded by Edwin A. Pollock	Commanding General of Marine Corps Base Quantico; July 22, 1956 - September 11, 1956	Succeeded by Merrill B. Twining
