= William Leahy =

William Leahy may refer to:

- William D. Leahy (1875–1959), American naval officer, diplomat, and Chief of Staff to the Commander in Chief from 1942-1949
- William Harrington Leahy (1904–1986), American naval officer
- William P. Leahy (born 1948), President of Boston College
- William Leahy (priest), Anglican priest in Ireland
