= Charles H. Hayes =

United States Marine Corps general

Charles Harold Hayes
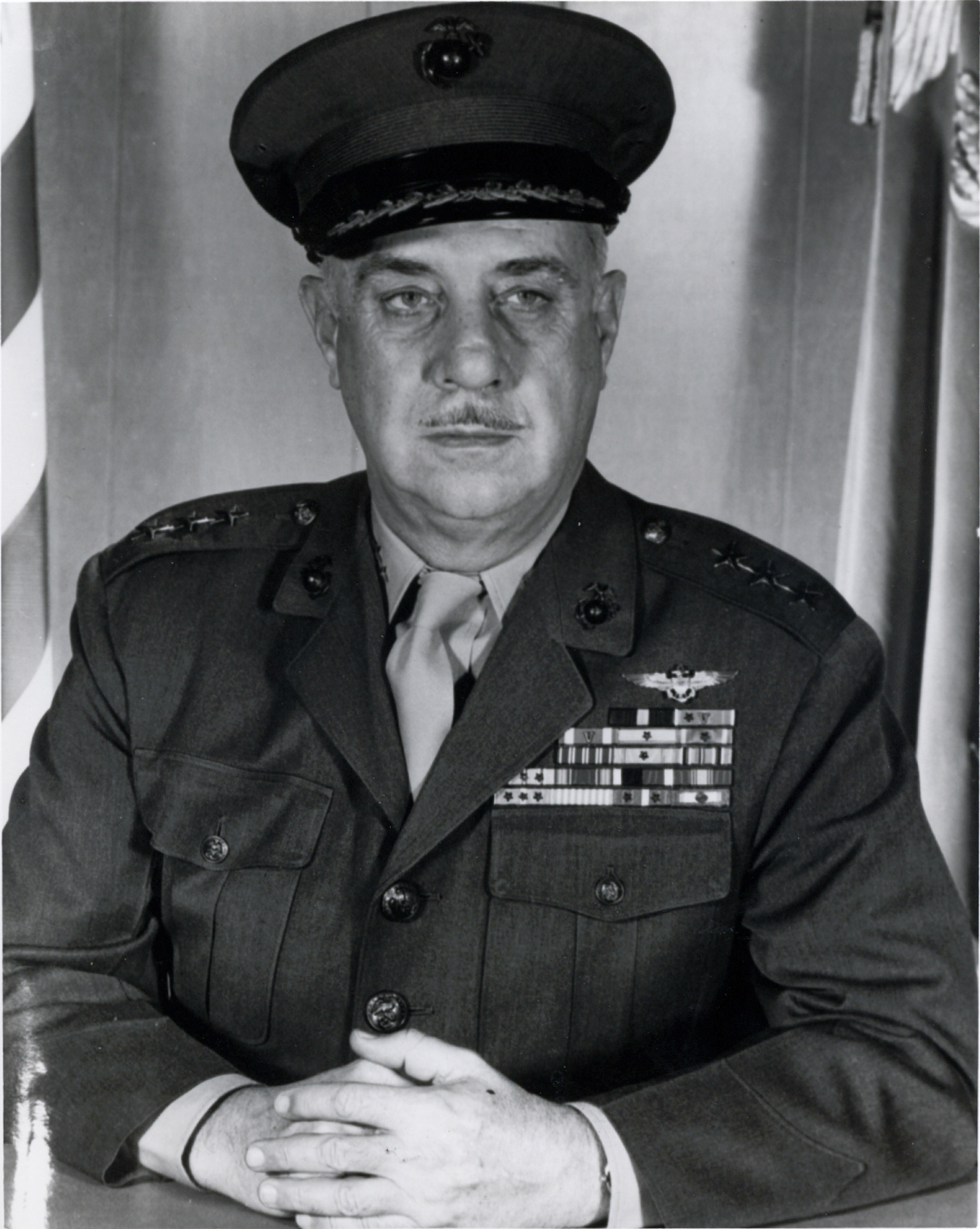
- Born: September 18, 1906; San Marcial, New Mexico
- Died: April 3, 1995 (aged 88)
- Burial place: Arlington National Cemetery
- Military career
- Allegiance: United States of America
- Branch: United States Marine Corps
- Rank: Lieutenant general
- Commands: Assistant Commandant of the Marine Corps; 3rd Marine Aircraft Wing; 1st Marine Aircraft Wing; Marine Corps Air Station Kaneohe Bay; Marine Aircraft Group 11
- Conflicts: World War II; Korean War
- Awards: Navy Distinguished Service Medal; Legion of Merit

Charles Harold Hayes (September 18, 1906 – April 3, 1995) was the 8th Assistant Commandant of the Marine Corps.

== Biography ==
McDougal was born September 18, 1906, in San Marcial, New Mexico. After joining the Marine Corps, he participated in World War II. By the time he retired, he had achieved the rank of lieutenant general.

He died April 3, 1995, and was buried at Arlington National Cemetery.

== Awards and decorations ==

Navy Distinguished Service Medal		Legion of Merit w/ 1 star & valor device	Navy and Marine Corps Commendation Medal w/ valor device
Navy Presidential Unit Citation	Navy Unit Commendation	Nicaraguan Campaign Medal (1933)	American Defense Service Medal w/ Base clasp
American Campaign Medal	Asiatic-Pacific Campaign Medal w/ 7 service stars	World War II Victory Medal	National Defense Service Medal
Korean Service Medal w/ 3 service stars	Korean Presidential Unit Citation	Philippine Liberation Medal w/ 2 service stars	United Nations Korea Medal

== See also ==
- List of 1st Marine Aircraft Wing commanders

Military offices
Preceded by John C. Munn	Assistant Commandant of the Marine Corps; April 1, 1963 — June 30, 1965	Succeeded by Richard C. Mangrum
Preceded by Arthur F. Binney	Commanding General of the 1st Marine Aircraft Wing; December 1957 — April 1959	Succeeded by Carson A. Roberts
