= 7th Antiaircraft Artillery Battalion =

- Active: 16 Dec 1940 – 2 Aug 1945
- Country: United States of America
- Branch: United States Marine Corps
- Type: Air Defense/Coastal Defense
- Size: ~1100 men
- Engagements: World War II; Battle of Angaur

Commanders
- Current commander: N/A
- Notable commanders: Lester A. Dessez; Henry R. Paige

The 7th Antiaircraft Artillery Battalion (7th AAA Bn) was a United States Marine Corps antiaircraft unit that served during World War II. Formed in 1940 as the 7th Defense Battalion, its original mission was to provide air and coastal defense for advanced naval bases. It was one of first five defense battalions deployed in support of the color-coded war plans that called for the defense of Hawaii and other outlying United States possessions in the Pacific Ocean. These five battalions were nicknamed the "Rainbow Five." During the war the battalion defended Tutuila, Upolu, Savai'i and Nanumea and took part in combat operations at Angaur. The 7th was decommissioned before the end of World War II on 2 August 1945.

== History ==
=== Organization ===
The 7th Defense Battalion was commissioned on 16 December 1940 at Marine Corps Base San Diego, California. From 16 December through 26 February 1941 the battalion focused on organizing, equipping and training for future employment. The battalion was organized differently then the other defense battalions at the time which were optimized for coastal and air defense. The 7th originally lacked the air defense capability and was composed of a headquarters company, an infantry company (Company A), and an artillery company (Company B).

=== American Samoa ===
Prior to the battalion even being formed an advanced party had been sent to Pago Pago on Tutuila to scout out locations. It arrived on 21 December 1940. On 27 February the battalion's main body embarked on the USS William P. Biddle (APA-8) at San Diego and sailed for Tutuila, American Samoa with a stop at Pearl Harbor on the way.

The main body of the 7th Defense Battalion arrived at Tutuila on 18 March 1941. This made the battalion the first unit of the Fleet Marine Force to ever operate in the South Pacific. The next few weeks saw the battalion heavily engaged in camp construction and the installation of artillery emplacements. In April 1941, after coming out of measles quarantine, the 7th Defense Battalion moved to Faga'alu and began construction of Camp Samuel Nicholas. In May 1941 authority was granted for the raising of a reserve native Samoan Battalion. The 1st Samoan Battalion was commissioned on 1 July 1941 and Marines from the 7th Defense Battalion were responsible for organizing and training these new recruits. On 7 December 1941 the battalion was informed about the attack on Pearl Harbor via a radio and immediately went to general quarters. The battalion's first exposure to combat occurred at 2:30AM on 11 January 1942 when a Japanese submarine surfaced and began shelling the Naval Station on Tutuila for approximately seven minutes. The 7th Defense Battalion, with the 1st Samoan Brigade attached, remained the sole defensive unit on Tutuila until 21 January 1942 when the island was reinforced by the 2nd Marine Brigade. Upon the brigade's arrival, the 7th Defense Battalion fell under its command. Maintaining the position on Tutuila was critical to ensuring that the lines of communication between Hawaii and Australia remained open.

=== Movement to Upolu, Hawaii and Nanomea ===
On 28 March 1942 the 7th Defense Battalion departed Tutuila onboard the SS President Garfield bound for the island of Upolu in Samoa. The battalion reinforced a small garrison of New Zealanders. Later on the battalion also establish a position on Savai'i. Savai'i was too mountainous for an airfield and the harbor was not deep enough for an anchorage however the detachment was needed for internal island security. On 9 May 1942 the battalion fell under the command of the 3rd Marine Brigade.

Beginning on 12 August 1943, the battalion left Apia Harbor in three successive waves headed for Nanumea, the northernmost of the Ellice Islands. The first detachment arrived on 14 August 1943 in order to occupy, organize, and defend the airfield that was being constructed by the 16th Naval Construction Battalion. On 10 November 1943 the battalion downed one Japanese bomber of a force of twelve that were sent to bomb the airfield. On 26 December 1943, E Battery was detached for duty with the 8th Defense Battalion on Apamama in the Gilbert Islands. The battalion remained on Nanumea until February 1944 when they were relieved by the 51st Defense Battalion. The battalion departed Nanumea on 9 March 1944 arriving at Kauai on 21 March 1944.

As the war progressed, the Marine Corps removed coastal artillery from the defense battalions in order to form additional heavy artillery units for the Fleet Marine Force. Because of the divestiture of the coastal defense mission, the battalion was re-designated as the 7th Antiaircraft Artillery Battalion on 16 April 1944.

=== Battle of Angaur, garrison duty and decommissioning ===
The assault echelon of the newly reorganized 7th Antiaircraft Artillery Battalion departed Kauia on 7 August 1944. The battalion had been tasked with installing, operating and maintaining and air warning system in support of the United States Army's 81st Infantry Division during the assault on Angaur. Angaur was part of the larger operation to dislodge the Japanese from the Palau Islands. The main body of the advance echelon went ashore on Angaur on 24 September 1944. On 11 November 1944 the 7th AAA Battalion became part of the Army Garrison Force on the island. The 7th AAA Battalion remained on Angaur as the garrison force until it was relieved of its mission on 12 July 1945. The battalion's personnel were transferred to the United States or other units in theater and the battalion was officially decommissioned 2 August 1945 on Guam.

== Notable former members ==
- George Shultz - Served as a company commander at Nanumea in 1943. Later served as the 60th United States Secretary of State

== Unit awards ==
A unit citation or commendation is an award bestowed upon an organization for the action cited. Members of the unit who participated in said actions are allowed to wear on their uniforms the awarded unit citation. The 7th Antiaircraft Artillery Battalion has been presented with the following awards:

Streamer	Award	Year(s)	Additional Info
	Asiatic-Pacific Campaign Streamer with one Bronze Star		Palau Islands campaign
	World War II Victory Streamer	1941–1945	Pacific War

== See also ==
- Marine Defense Battalions
- List of United States Marine Corps aviation support units
