= Donald Schmuck =

United States Marine Corps general (1915–2004)

Donald M. Schmuck
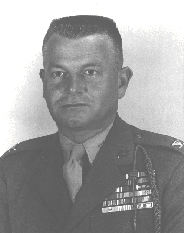
- Brigadier General Donald Schmuck
- Born: August 16, 1915
- Died: January 24, 2004 (aged 88)
- Burial place: Arlington National Cemetery
- Military career
- Allegiance: United States of America
- Branch: United States Marine Corps
- Service years: 1935–1960
- Rank: Brigadier general
- Nickname: "Buck"
- Service number: 0-5914
- Commands: 1st Battalion, 1st Marines; 5th Marine Regiment
- Conflicts: World War II; Korean War; Battle of Chosin Reservoir
- Awards: Navy Cross; Silver Star (2); Legion of Merit; Bronze Star (2); Purple Heart

Brigadier General Donald Myron "Buck" Schmuck, (USMC ret.) (August 16, 1915 – January 24, 2004) was a United States Marine Corps brigadier general who served with distinction during World War II and the Korean War — and was awarded the Navy Cross and two Silver Stars for his heroic actions.

== Biography ==
Schmuck grew up in Denver and on the family ranch near Walden, Colorado. He attended the University of Colorado and the U.S. Coast Guard Academy having enlisted in the Marine Corps in 1935 and was later commissioned a second lieutenant in 1938 following graduation from university.

After basic training, he served as a platoon leader at San Diego Marine Corps Base, then served in the South Pacific with the 2nd Marine Brigade during World War II, seeing action in Guadalcanal, Vella Lavella, and Bougainville as a rifle company commander. He was hospitalized briefly from injuries sustained in Bougainville and then joined the 1st Marine Division in time for landings on Peleliu and, later, Okinawa, where he was again wounded in action. He was a lieutenant colonel commanding an infantry battalion training for the invasion of Japan when the war ended.

Donald Schmuck attended the Amphibious Warfare School at Quantico, Virginia, and the Army Airborne School at Fort Benning, Georgia, then did a short tour with the 82nd Airborne Division at Fort Bragg, North Carolina, before returning to Quantico as an instructor in the Marine Corps Schools.

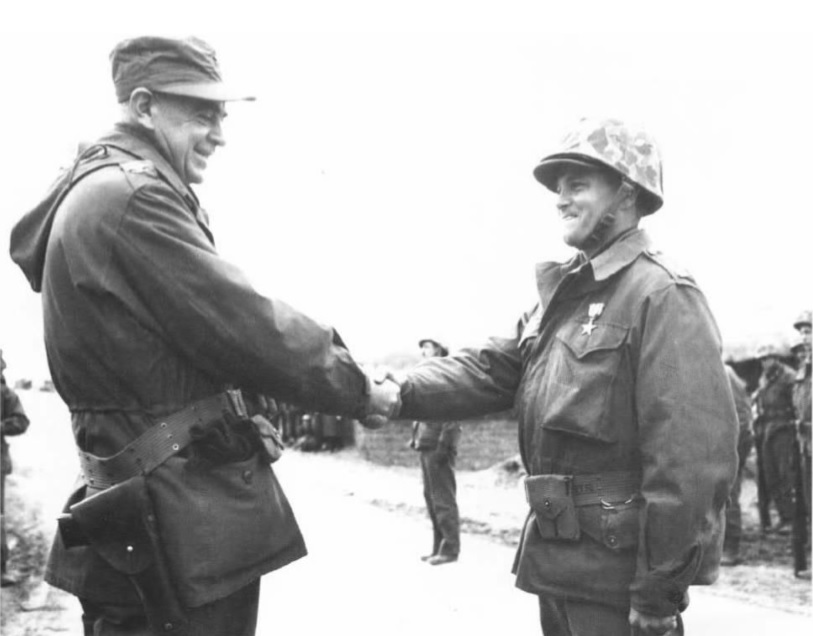
LTC Donald M. Schmuck receiving Silver Star from Colonel Francis M. McAlister for his service with 1st Battalion, 1st Marines at Chinhung-ni from November 26-December 11, 1950.

In 1949 he was ordered to the United Nations Middle Eastern Commission and was active in Lebanon, Israel, Jordan, Syria, Egypt, and Iraq. Schmuck joined the 1st Marine Division at the start of the Korean War in 1950, assigned as commander, 1st Battalion, 1st Marines under the regimental command of Col. Chesty Puller. He led the 1st Battalion in action during 1950 and 1951, including the Chosin Reservoir operation and the Spring Counter Offensive. He served as regimental executive through the Summer Offensive and served with the Fleet Marine Force Pacific at Pearl Harbor after Korea. During that duty, Schmuck was charged with producing a number of contingency war plans covering national objectives in Asia, including several locations in Vietnam, and he conducted the in-country reconnaissance required for those plans. In 1959 he attended the Army War College at Carlisle Barracks, Pennsylvania.

Schmuck retired from the Marine Corps in 1960 with the rank of brigadier general, continuing to be active in special missions in Central America, Vietnam, and Laos. He completed a PhD in nuclear physics at CU–Boulder in the early 1960s, and was a military observer during Desert Storm in February 1991 in the Gulf War.

He was active with the Marine Corps League in Wyoming and Hawaii, and was a founding member of the Viet Nam Vets Motorcycle Club http://www.texasvnvmc.com . He purchased the Triangle-S ranch between Buffalo and Sheridan, Wyoming. He died, aged 88, in Honolulu and is buried at Arlington National Cemetery.

He never married and is survived by his brother, retired Cmdr. Carl Schmuck of Anacortes, Washington, and numerous nieces and nephews.

== Awards ==
General Schmuck's decorations include:

Navy Cross	Silver Star w/ 1 award star	Legion of Merit w/ valor device	Bronze Star w/ 1 award star & valor device	French Fourragère
Purple Heart w/ 2 award stars	Air Medal	Navy and Marine Corps Commendation Medal w/ valor device	Navy Presidential Unit Citation w/ 5 service stars	French Fourragère
Navy Unit Commendation	American Campaign Medal	Asiatic-Pacific Campaign Medal	World War II Victory Medal	French Fourragère
National Defense Service Medal	Korean Service Medal w/ 1 service star	Korean Presidential Unit Citation w/ 1 service star	United Nations Korea Medal	French Fourragère
