= David F. O'Neill =

American Major general

David Ferguson O'Neill
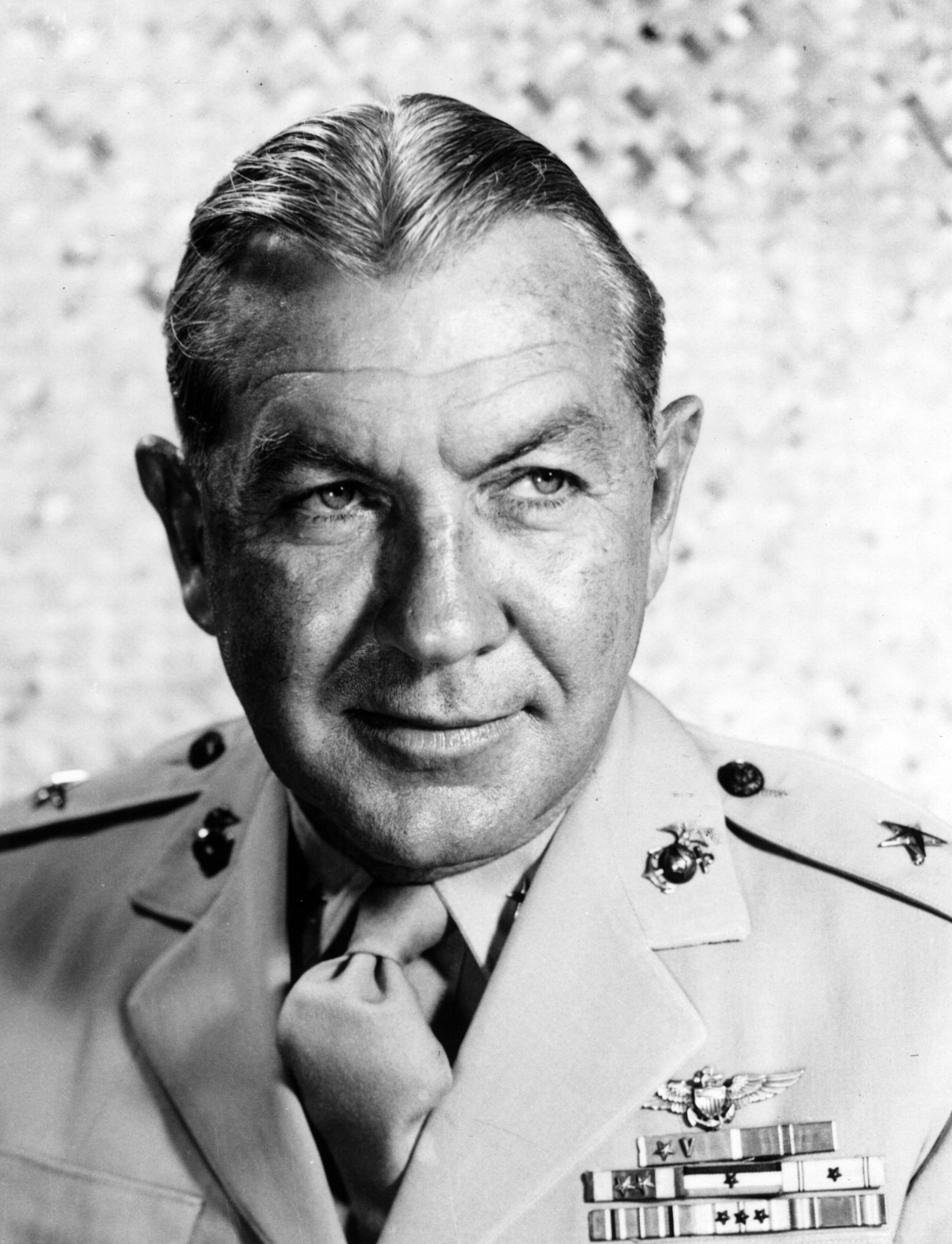
- O'Neill as brigadier general, USMC
- Born: December 27, 1904; Huntsville, Alabama, US
- Died: September 27, 1963 (aged 58); Washington, D.C., US
- Burial place: Arlington National Cemetery
- Military career
- Allegiance: United States of America
- Branch: United States Marine Corps
- Service years: 1927–1958
- Rank: Major general
- Nickname: "Peg"
- Service number: 0-4271
- Commands: 1st Marine Aircraft Wing; MCAS El Toro; Marine Aircraft Group 31; MCAS Miramar
- Conflicts: World War II: Guadalcanal campaign; New Britain campaign; Bougainville campaign; Korean War
- Awards: Legion of Merit (2); Bronze Star Medal; Air Medal (3)

David Ferguson O'Neill (December 27, 1904 – September 27, 1963) was a decorated Naval aviator and officer in the United States Marine Corps with the rank of major general. A veteran of World War II, he commanded Strike Command, Aircraft Solomons on Guadalcanal, New Britain and Bougainville and received several decorations for his service.

O'Neill rose to the general's rank and commanded Force Aviation, Aircraft, Fleet Marine Force, Pacific and later 1st Marine Aircraft Wing in Japan, before he was relieved of command and ordered back to the United States. He retired in July 1958.

== Early career ==
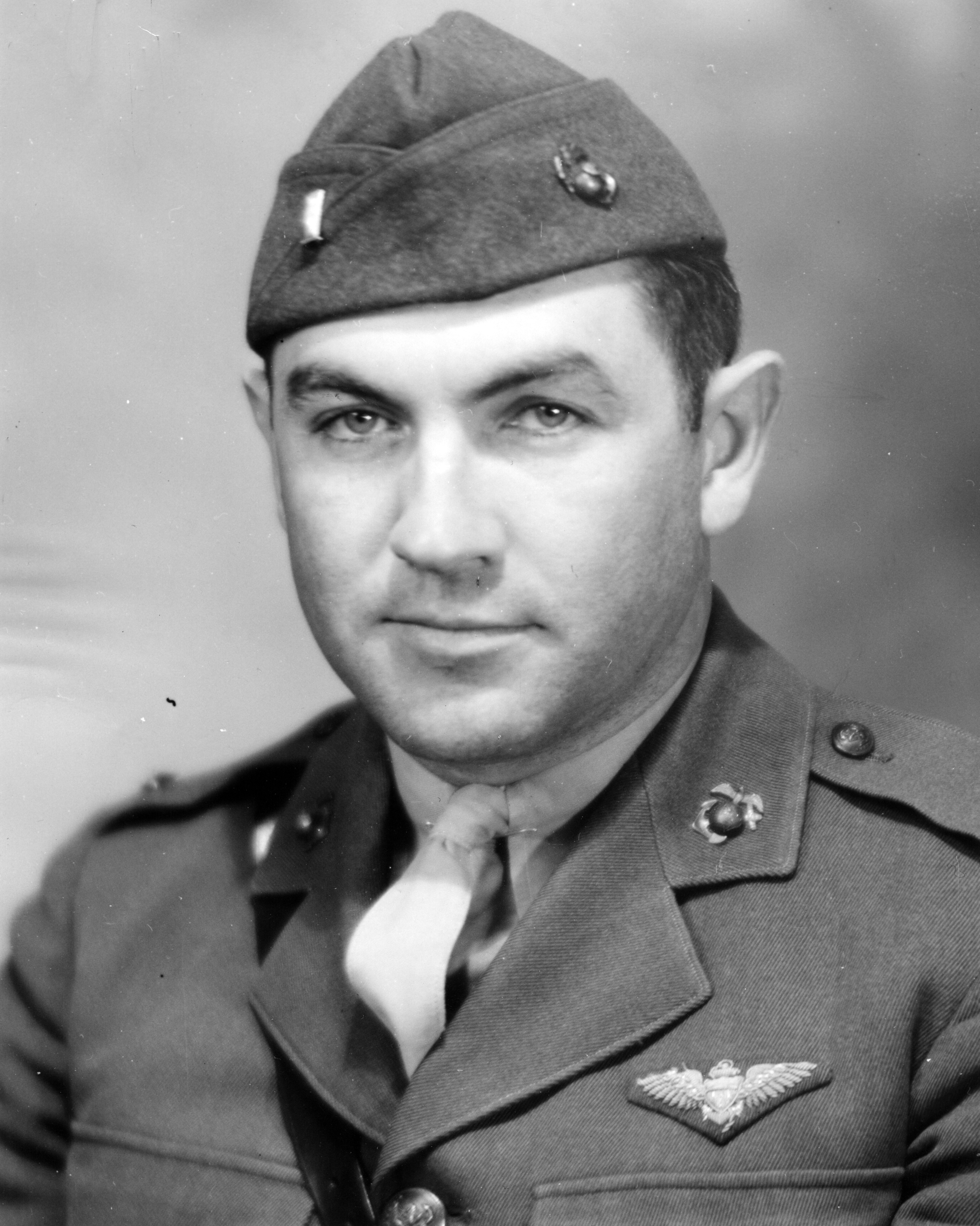
O'Neill as first lieutenant in October 1934.

David F. O'Neill was born on December 27, 1904, in Huntsville, Alabama, as the son of Peter H. O'Neill and Sarah Henderson. He attended the schools in Evansville, Indiana, and Hickory, North Carolina, before returned to Huntsville, where he graduated from the local high school. O'Neill then entered the Marion Military Institute in Marion, Alabama, and studied there until he received an appointment to the United States Naval Academy at Annapolis, Maryland, in June 1923.

While at the academy, O'Neill excelled in football and was awarded "N" for excellence in that sport. He was also active in baseball, and basketball and was nicknamed "Peg" by his peers. Among his classmates were several future general officer including future Chief of Naval Operations George W. Anderson Jr.; Admiral John Thach, vice admirals Glynn R. Donaho and Herbert D. Riley; Marine lieutenant generals John C. Munn and Alan Shapley; major generals Marion L. Dawson, Samuel S. Jack, Jack P. Juhan, Francis M. McAlister, Henry R. Paige and brigadier generals Walter L. J. Bayler, Joseph E. Earnshaw, Harold D. Hansen, Archie E. O'Neil, Richard P. Ross Jr. and Earl S. Piper.

Upon graduation with Bachelor of Science degree on June 2, 1927, he was commissioned second lieutenant in the Marine Corps and ordered to the Basic School at Philadelphia Navy Yard for officers' instruction. O'Neill completed the course in January 1928 and due to his excellency in football, he was selected for the All-Marine Corps Football Team at Marine Barracks Quantico, Virginia, and played as Defensive back for season 1927–1928.

O'Neill was transferred to the Marine barracks at Naval Torpedo Station Newport, Rhode Island in December 1928 and served there until August 1930, when he was sent to the Marine barracks at Philadelphia Navy Yard. While there, he served as a manager of All-Marine Corps Baseball Team for one season, before returned to Marine Barracks Quantico in February 1931 and rejoined Marine Corps football team.

In March 1932, O'Neill was ordered to the Naval Air Station Pensacola, Florida, for flight training, which he completed in March 1933 and was designated Naval aviator. He was subsequently ordered to Naval Air Station San Diego, California. He joined the Aircraft Squadrons, West Coast Expeditionary Force and participated in the maneuvers aboard aircraft carrier Langley off the coast of California.

O'Neill was promoted to first lieutenant in January 1934 and later served with the Marine Air Squadron aboard aircraft carrier Lexington. He was promoted to captain in June 1936 and participated in another series of maneuvers in the Caribbean and off the East Coast.

In June 1937, O'Neill returned to Quantico, Virginia, and joined the Marine Bombing Squadron 1-M, participating in the maneuvers in the Caribbean. He was ordered to the Marine Corps Schools, Quantico, in August 1939 and completed junior course in May 1940. O'Neill then joined as flight officer the Marine Scouting Squadron 1 at Quantico and later accompanied his unit to Guantánamo Bay, Cuba.

== World War II ==
Upon his return stateside in July 1941, O'Neill was promoted to major and joined the newly activated 2nd Marine Aircraft Wing under Brigadier General Roy S. Geiger as Air Liaison Officer with the Amphibious Corps, Pacific Fleet under Major General Clayton B. Vogel. Following the Japanese Attack on Pearl Harbor and the United States entry into World War II, O'Neill participated in the intensive preparation for combat deployment and was promoted to the temporary rank of lieutenant colonel in August 1942.

O'Neill embarked for South Pacific in October that year and served as air liaison officer between general Vogel's I Marine Amphibious Corps and 1st Marine Aircraft Wing, now under the command of his former superior officer, Roy S. Geiger. O'Neill participated in several aerial combat missions during the Battle of Guadalcanal and received his first Air Medal.

In July 1943, he assumed command of Strike Command, Aircraft Solomon Islands, controlling all Navy, Marine and RNZAF dive bombing, torpedo-bombing, and search planes. For his new command, O'Neill was promoted to the temporary rank of colonel on September 30, 1943. He led his command during the strikes on New Britain, Munda, and Bougainville and received two awards of Legion of Merit with Combat "V" and two more Air Medals.

O'Neill was relieved by Colonel Frank Schwable in March 1944 and returned to the United States for new assignment. He was subsequently ordered to Washington, D.C., where he joined the Headquarters Marine Corps for duty as aviation operations officer in the Division of Plans and Policies under Major General Gerald C. Thomas. O'Neill served in this capacity until December that year, when he was transferred to the Marine Corps Air Station Cherry Point, North Carolina, for duty as chief of staff of the base.

He remained in that assignment until March 1945, when he was transferred to Hawaii and joined the headquarters of Commander-in-Chief, Pacific Fleet under Fleet Admiral Chester Nimitz. He served on the Nimitz's Plans Division as Assistant War Plans Officer and participated in the planning of Operation Downfall, intended invasion of Japan. Following the surrender of Japan and cancellation of Invasion, the plans were adapted to the occupation of that country and O'Neill received the Bronze Star Medal for his service.

== Postwar service ==
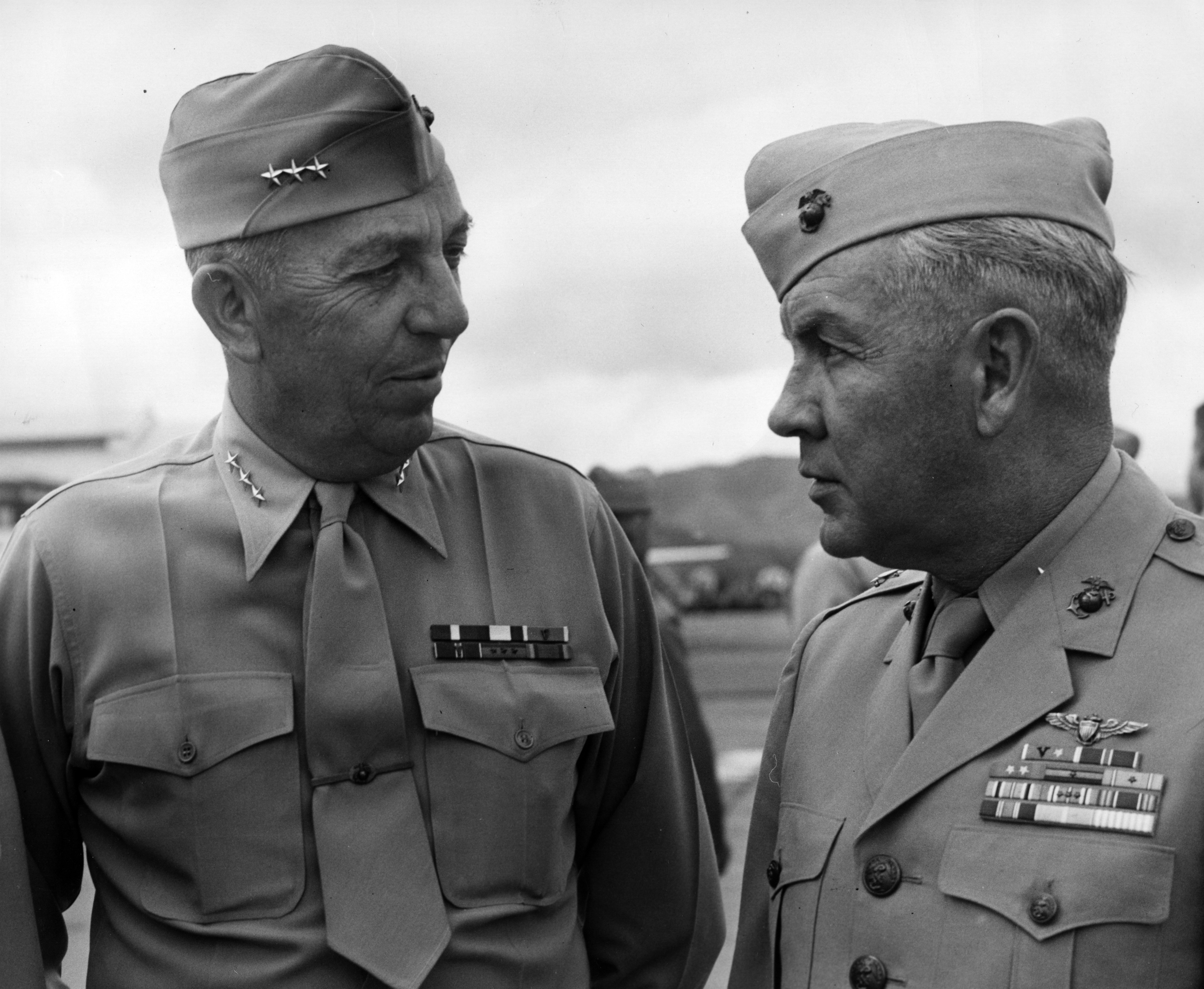
O'Neill (right) during the conversation with Lt. Gen. Edwin A. Pollock, CG, FMFPac during inspection tour at MCAS Iwakuni, Japan, in July 1956.

In November 1945, O'Neill was transferred to the staff of 2nd Marine Aircraft Wing under Major General Ralph J. Mitchell and served as assistant chief of staff for operations and training at Cherry Point, North Carolina, until February 1946. He was then transferred to the headquarters of Marine Air, West Coast at Marine Corps Air Station Miramar, California, where he served for a brief period as personnel officer under Major General William J. Wallace, before assumed command of Miramar Air Station in June 1946. O'Neill was responsible for training of replacements and demobilization of combat troops returning from overseas.

O'Neill was sent to the National War College in Washington, D.C., and upon graduation in June 1948, he was appointed head of Personnel Branch, Division of Aviation at Marine Corps Headquarters and served again under General Wallace for two years.

In June 1950, O'Neill was transferred to the Naval Air Station Glenview, Illinois, where assumed duty as chief of staff, Marine Air Reserve Training Command under Brigadier General William O. Brice. He was co-responsible for the training of Marine reservists and following the departure of general Brice in April 1951, O'Neill served as acting commander of Air Reserve Training Command for five months.

O'Neill was ordered to command of Marine Corps Air Station El Toro, California, in October 1951 and remained in that capacity until April 1954, when he was promoted to brigadier general and ordered to Korea for duty as assistant commander, 1st Marine Aircraft Wing consecutively under major generals Verne J. McCaul and Marion L. Dawson. Due to signed peace agreement, the operations of O'Neill's Wing were limited to the patrolling along the Korean Demilitarized Zone.

He returned to the United States in February 1955 and assumed duty as commanding general, Force Aviation, Aircraft, Fleet Marine Force, Pacific. O'Neill was transferred to Japan in July 1956 and assumed command of 1st Marine Aircraft Wing at Marine Corps Air Station Iwakuni. His tour of Korea has ended prematurely, when he was relieved of command in November 1956 by Commandant of the Marine Corps, Randolph M. Pate.

General Pate was appointed commandant on January 1, 1956, and two months later, he issued an order which said dependents should not "accompany or later join" marines assigned to the Far East. The order applied to members of combat units considered to be in a state of readiness for transfer to trouble spots at a moment's notice. However, some of the servicemen's wives they had a right to come if they obtain tourists visas and paid their own way.

In October 1956, O'Neill was instructed by his direct superior, Lieutenant general Edwin A. Pollock, commander of Fleet Marine Force, Pacific to inform each affected marine by letter, that if his dependents stayed in Japan longer than sixty days they would lose their tourist status and be considered to be in the Far East in violation of Commandant Pate's order. The Army, United States Navy, Air Force did not issued similar orders and marine wives became highly invested, mailing their complaints to Washington, D.C.

By the end of November 1956, O'Neill was relieved of command by Major General Arthur H. Binney and ordered back to the United States. The official explanation was, that change in command was in no way connected with O'Neill's order about wives and his transfer had been planned for some time. Commandant Pate commented whole matter, that O'Neill made an error, and that the Marine dependents policy had been relaxed somewhat in some units, but should have been enforced in certain units long ago.

O'Neill was then ordered to Marine Corps Air Station Miami, Florida and assumed command of Marine Aircraft Group 31 (Reinforced), which he held until his retirement. He retired from active duty on July 1, 1958, after 31 years of service and was advanced to the rank of major general on the retired list for having been specially commended in combat.

== Retirement ==
Following his retirement from the Marines, O'Neill worked for Thiokol Chemical Corporation in Bristol, Pennsylvania, before returned to Washington, D.C., for his second retirement.

Major General David F. O'Neill died on September 27, 1963, aged 58, and was buried with full military honors at Arlington National Cemetery, Virginia. His wife Alice E. O'Neill was buried beside him.

== Decorations ==
Major General O'Neill's personal decorations include:

Naval Aviator Badge
1st Row	Legion of Merit with one 5/16" Gold Star and Combat "V"		Bronze Star Medal
2nd Row	Air Medal with two 5/16" Gold Stars	Navy Presidential Unit Citation with one star	American Defense Service Medal with Base Clasp
3rd Row	American Campaign Medal	Asiatic-Pacific Campaign Medal with three 3/16 inch service stars	World War II Victory Medal
4th Row	National Defense Service Medal	Korean Service Medal	United Nations Korea Medal

== See also ==
- United States Naval Aviator

Military offices
Preceded by Samuel S. Jack	Commanding General, 1st Marine Aircraft Wing; July 1, 1956 - November 27, 1956	Succeeded by Arthur F. Binney
