= Gregon A. Williams =

U.S. Marine Corps Major General

Gregon Albert Williams
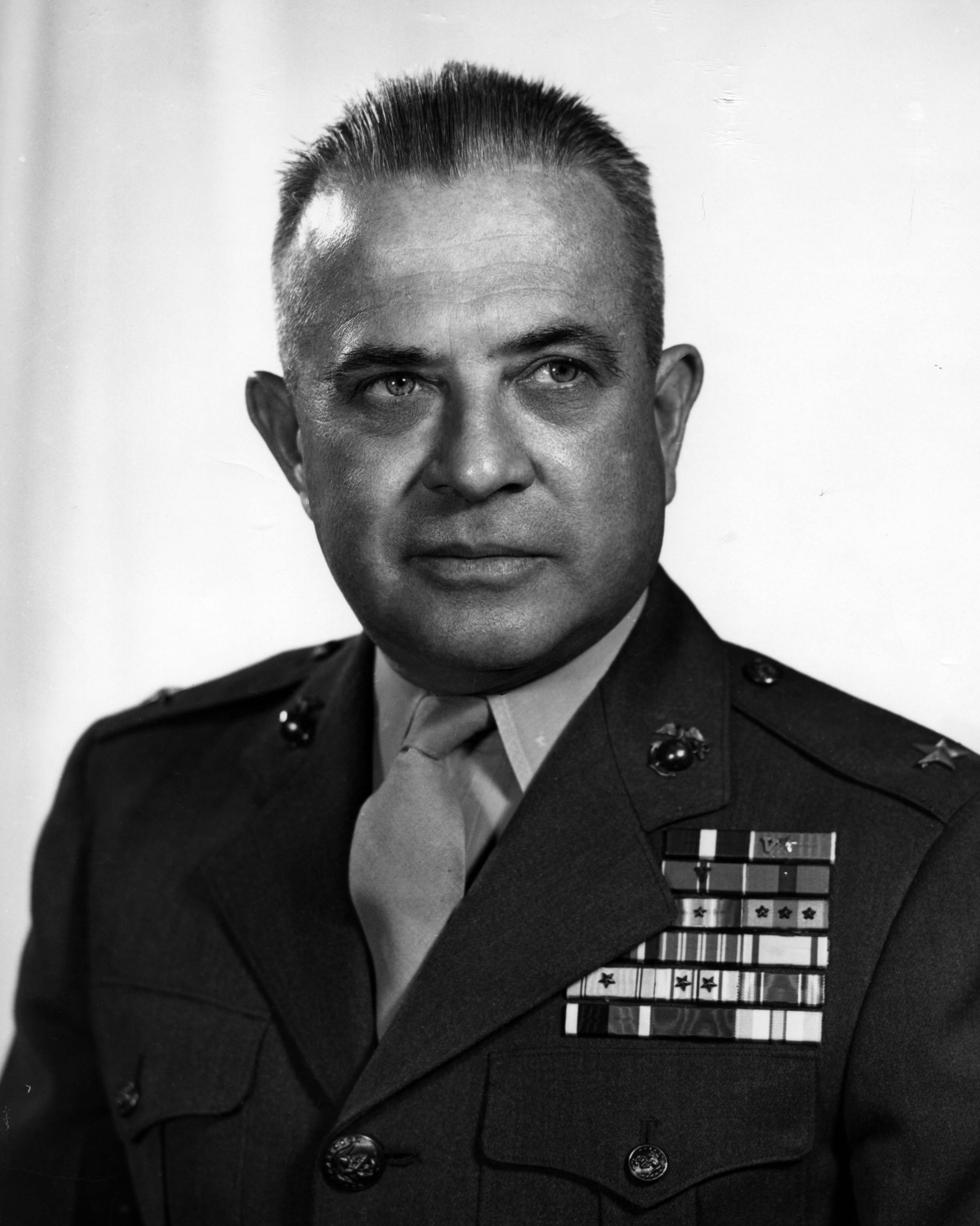
- Gregon A. Williams as brigadier general, USMC
- Born: January 8, 1896; Carrollton, Illinois, US
- Died: September 8, 1968 (aged 72); San Diego, California, US
- Burial place: Greenwood Memorial Park
- Military career
- Allegiance: United States
- Branch: United States Marine Corps
- Service years: 1917–1954
- Rank: Major general
- Service number: 0-3812
- Commands: Inspector General Marine Corps; CoS of 1st Marine Division; CoS of Fleet Marine Force, Pacific; 6th Marine Regiment; Assistant Naval attaché Shangai
- Conflicts: World War I; Dominican Campaign; Yangtze Patrol; Nicaraguan Campaign; World War II; Battle of Okinawa; Korean War; Battle of Inchon; Second Battle of Seoul; Battle of Chosin Reservoir
- Awards: Navy Cross; Legion of Merit (3); Bronze Star Medal

Major General Gregon Albert Williams (January 8, 1896 – September 8, 1968) was a highly decorated officer of the United States Marine Corps who served in World War II and the Korean War. He commanded the 6th Marine Regiment during the Battle of Okinawa and later served as the chief of staff of 1st Marine Division.

== Early service ==
Gregon Williams was born on January 8, 1896, in Carrollton, Illinois. His family moved to San Diego, California, in his early years and he attended high school there. Williams enrolled at junior college, but with the United States entry into World War I in April 1917, he decided to enlist rather than continue with his studies. He joined the Marine Corps in June 1917 and was sent as private for basic training at the Mare Island Naval Shipyard in California.

However, instead of being sent to France to join the American Expeditionary Forces there, Williams sailed for Santo Domingo with the 2nd Provisional Brigade under the command of Brigadier General Joseph H. Pendleton. He was promoted to first sergeant and served with the Dominican Guardia Nacional as a company commander. He was decorated with the Marine Corps Good Conduct Medal for his enlisted service and returned to the United States in November 1922.

Williams was commissioned as second lieutenant on December 23, 1922, and attended Officer Candidates School at Quantico in Virginia. He graduated in July 1923 and subsequently was assigned to Marine Barracks, Parris Island in South Carolina. He remained in this capacity until summer 1924, when he was transferred to a post in the Dominican Republic.

Following his return to the United States, Williams was assigned to the 10th Marine Regiment based at Quantico. In October 1926, Williams was ordered with his regiment to St. Louis, Missouri, and performed mail guard duties on the railways. He sailed for Tianjin, China in March 1927 as a member of the 10th Marines, 3rd Brigade, to serve on the Yangtze Patrol. He was promoted to the rank of first lieutenant in February 1928 and appointed the brigade's intelligence officer. Williams also additionally served as aide-de-camp to the brigade's commanding general, Smedley Butler.

Williams returned home in January 1929 and was assigned to the Headquarters Marine Corps, where he served for one year. He sailed for Nicaragua in January 1930 and commanded units of Guardia Nacional during several skirmishes with Sandino bandits in the Somoto region for which he was decorated with the Navy Cross by the Secretary of the Navy Charles F. Adams. He also received the Nicaraguan Cross of Valor and Diploma from the Government of Nicaragua.

Williams served in Nicaragua until January 1933, when he was posted back to the Headquarters Marine Corps. Williams later attended the Officers Junior Course at Officer Candidates School in Quantico and was appointed intelligence officer at the Marine Corps Base San Diego. While based there, he was promoted to the rank of captain in March 1935. Williams was subsequently appointed commanding officer of the Marine detachment aboard the battleship USS Mississippi in June 1937.

== World War II ==
In June 1939, Williams was transferred to China and appointed assistant naval attaché in Shanghai. In his new assignment, he was promoted to the rank of major. Following the Japanese attack on Pearl Harbor in December 1941, all Marine detachments and other allied personnel in Japanese-held territory were captured by the Imperial Japanese Army units. Williams, along with US consulate personnel in Shanghai, was interned in the Metropole Hotel. In June 1942, as part of the first US-Japan exchange of diplomatic and civilian personnel, he sailed from Shanghai aboard the TSS Conte Verde to Lourenco Marques, then to New York City aboard the Swedish liner MS Gripsholm which arrived in August 1942. Upon his return, Williams was promoted to the rank of lieutenant colonel and decorated with the Legion of Merit for his service in Shanghai.

After a few months of medical leave, Williams returned to China in January 1943 and was assigned to the American embassy in Chungking as naval observer. He also simultaneously served with the US Naval Group China as instructor for Kuomintang guerrillas. He returned to the United States in July 1944 and after promotion to colonel, relieved Colonel James P. Riseley as commanding officer of the 6th Marine Regiment just after the Battle of Saipan. The 6th Marines sustained heavy casualties on Saipan and Williams supervised training and refitting of the regiment until the spring of 1945.

In early April 1945, Williams led his regiment to Okinawa as a part of 2nd Marine Division under Major General Thomas E. Watson. He distinguished himself again and received the Bronze Star Medal with a Combat "V" device.

== Later service ==
Along with his regiment, Williams performed occupation duties in Japan, until he was relieved by Colonel Jack P. Juhan at the beginning of November 1945. He was subsequently appointed the chief of staff of the 2nd Division under Major General LeRoy P. Hunt. Occupation duties ended for the 2nd Division in June 1946, and Williams sailed for the United States. He was stationed at Camp Lejeune, North Carolina, before he relocated to Camp Pendleton, California for duty as chief of staff, Fleet Marine Force, Pacific.

Upon the outbreak of the Korean War, Williams was transferred to the staff of 1st Marine Division under Major General Oliver P. Smith in June 1950. He participated in the Inchon landings, Second Battle of Seoul and Battle of Chosin Reservoir. He ran the divisional staff with an iron hand, and was decorated with two awards of the Legion of Merit with "V" Device. He was succeeded by Colonel Victor H. Krulak at the end of January 1951 and transferred back to the United States.

Promoted to the rank of brigadier general on January 1, 1951, he was appointed commanding general, Force Troops, Fleet Marine Force, Atlantic at Camp Lejeune. His last assignment came in April 1953, when he was appointed Inspector General of the Marine Corps. He served in this capacity until September 1954, when he retired from the Marine Corps and was advanced to the rank of major general on the retired list for having been specially commended in combat.

Williams died on September 8, 1968, in San Diego.

== Decorations ==
Here is the ribbon bar of Major General Gregon A. Williams:

1st row	Navy Cross			
2nd row	Legion of Merit with Combat "V" and two Gold Stars	Bronze Star Medal with Combat "V"	Marine Corps Good Conduct Medal	Navy Presidential Unit Citation with one star
3rd row	World War I Victory Medal with West Indies Clasp	Marine Corps Expeditionary Medal with three stars	Yangtze Service Medal	Second Nicaraguan Campaign Medal
4th row	China Service Medal	American Defense Service Medal with Base Clasp	Asiatic-Pacific Campaign Medal with two 3/16 inch service stars	American Campaign Medal
5th row	World War II Victory Medal	Navy Occupation Service Medal	Korean Service Medal with two 3/16 inch service stars	National Defense Service Medal
6th row	Order of Military Merit (Dominican Republic)	Nicaraguan Cross of Valor and Diploma	Republic of Korea Presidential Unit Citation	United Nations Korea Medal

Military offices
Preceded by James P. Riseley	Commanding Officer of the 6th Marine Regiment; 4 September 1944 – 5 November 1945	Succeeded by Jack P. Juhan
