= William Leahy (priest) =

William Leahy was an Anglican priest in Ireland during the 19th century.

Leahy was born in Dublin educated at Trinity College there. The Rector of Moylough, he was Archdeacon of Killala from 1850 to 1874.
