= Samuel S. Jack =

US Marine Corps major general (1905–1983)

Samuel Sloan Jack
- Born: August 5, 1905; Flagstaff, Arizona Territory
- Died: March 25, 1983 (aged 77) San Diego, California, US
- Buried: Fort Rosecrans National Cemetery
- Allegiance: United States of America
- Branch: United States Marine Corps
- Service years: 1927–1961
- Rank: Major general
- Commands: 1st Marine Aircraft Wing
- Conflicts: Banana Wars: Occupation of Nicaragua; World War II: Guadalcanal Campaign; Korean War
- Awards: Navy Cross; Legion of Merit (3)

Samuel Sloan Jack (August 5, 1905 – March 25, 1983) was a highly decorated United States Marine with the rank of major general.

== Early life and Banana Wars ==
Samuel S. Jack was born on August 5, 1905, in Flagstaff, Arizona Territory. He graduated from the United States Naval Academy at Annapolis, Maryland on June 2, 1927. Upon graduation, he received a commission into the Marine Corps as a second lieutenant. From July to August 1930, he served as the commanding officer of Fighting Plane Squadron 10M.

Second Lieutenant Jack was attached to the 2nd Marine Brigade in Nicaragua as a Marine aviator. On April 12, 1931, he effectively bombed a Sandino bandit camp near Moss Farm despite withering machine gun and rifle fire from bandits. The next day, he located another bandit camp at Logtown and relayed this information to a Marine patrol. He led the patrol towards the camp and strafed the bandits in the camp with his machine guns. The patrol soon arrived at the camp and killed Pedro Blandon, a Sandino leader. For his actions, Jack was awarded the Navy Cross.

In July 1933, Jack participated in the Los Angeles National Air Races. Jack helped demonstrate the capabilities of Marine aviators to the country.

== World War II and Korea ==
Jack would again see combat during World War II. From mid-November 1942 until mid-January 1943, Colonel Jack was made the commanding officer of all Naval aircraft on Guadalcanal, Solomon Islands. During this time, fighter pilots under his charge destroyed nearly 80 enemy aircraft in aerial combat. Jack was awarded two Legions of Merit during the war.

Jack was later deployed during the Korean War where he was the chief of staff for the 1st Marine Aircraft Wing, during which he was awarded a third Legion of Merit. In Korea, Jack had evidence that the enemy was using false radio beacons to confuse American pilots, in one instance six pilots crashed into the side of a mountain during poor weather conditions.

== Later career and life ==
From September 1955 to June 1956, he served as the commanding general of the 1st Marine Aircraft Wing. During Jack's last month as commanding general of the 1st Marine Aircraft Wing, the unit began relocating from Korea to Marine Corps Air Station Iwakuni, Japan. From January to February 1958, he served as the Director of Aviation. Jack eventually retired from the Marines as a Major General in 1961.

Samuel S. Jack died on March 25, 1983, in San Diego, California. He was buried in Fort Rosecrans National Cemetery.

== See also ==
- List of 1st Marine Aircraft Wing commanders

Military offices
Preceded by Marion L. Dawson	Commanding General of the 1st Marine Aircraft Wing; September 25, 1955 – June 30, 1956	Succeeded by David F. O'Neill
Preceded by Verne J. McCaul	Director of Aviation; January 14, 1958 – February 20, 1958	Succeeded by John C. Munn
