= William Harrington Leahy =

United States Navy admiral

- Born: October 27, 1904; Washington, D.C., US
- Died: May 12, 1986 (aged 81); Chevy Chase, Maryland, US
- Burial place: Arlington National Cemetery
- Relatives: FADM William D. Leahy (father)
- Military career
- Allegiance: United States of America
- Branch: United States Navy
- Service years: 1927–1961
- Rank: Rear Admiral
- Commands: Norfolk Navy Yard
- Conflicts: World War II; Cold War
- Awards: Legion of Merit

William Harrington Leahy (October 27, 1904 – May 12, 1986) was a rear admiral in the United States Navy, and the son of William D. Leahy, President Franklin D. Roosevelt's military chief of staff during World War II.

== Biography ==
Leahy was born on October 27, 1904, in San Francisco, California. His father was Fleet Admiral William D. Leahy. Leahy married Elizabeth Marbury Beale on July 23, 1927, and had two children, Louise Harrington (named after her grandmother) and Robert Beale.

After attending Sidwell Friends School he completed his undergraduate study at the United States Naval Academy; he also received a master's degree in naval architecture from MIT and did further work in management at Harvard Business School.

Leahy served as Senior Design Officer, Landing Craft Construction, and later Head of the Landing Craft Section, Bureau of Ships, from November 1942 to October 1945 and received Legion of Merit for his service. As a Rear Admiral, he was Shipyard Commander, Norfolk Navy Yard between 30 June 1958 and 29 June 1960.

Leahy was a member of the Society of Naval Architects and Marine Engineers and the Newcomen Society.

He died on May 12, 1986, in Chevy Chase, Maryland, and is buried with Elizabeth and his parents at Arlington National Cemetery.
