= John C. Munn =

United States Marine Corps general

John Calvin Munn
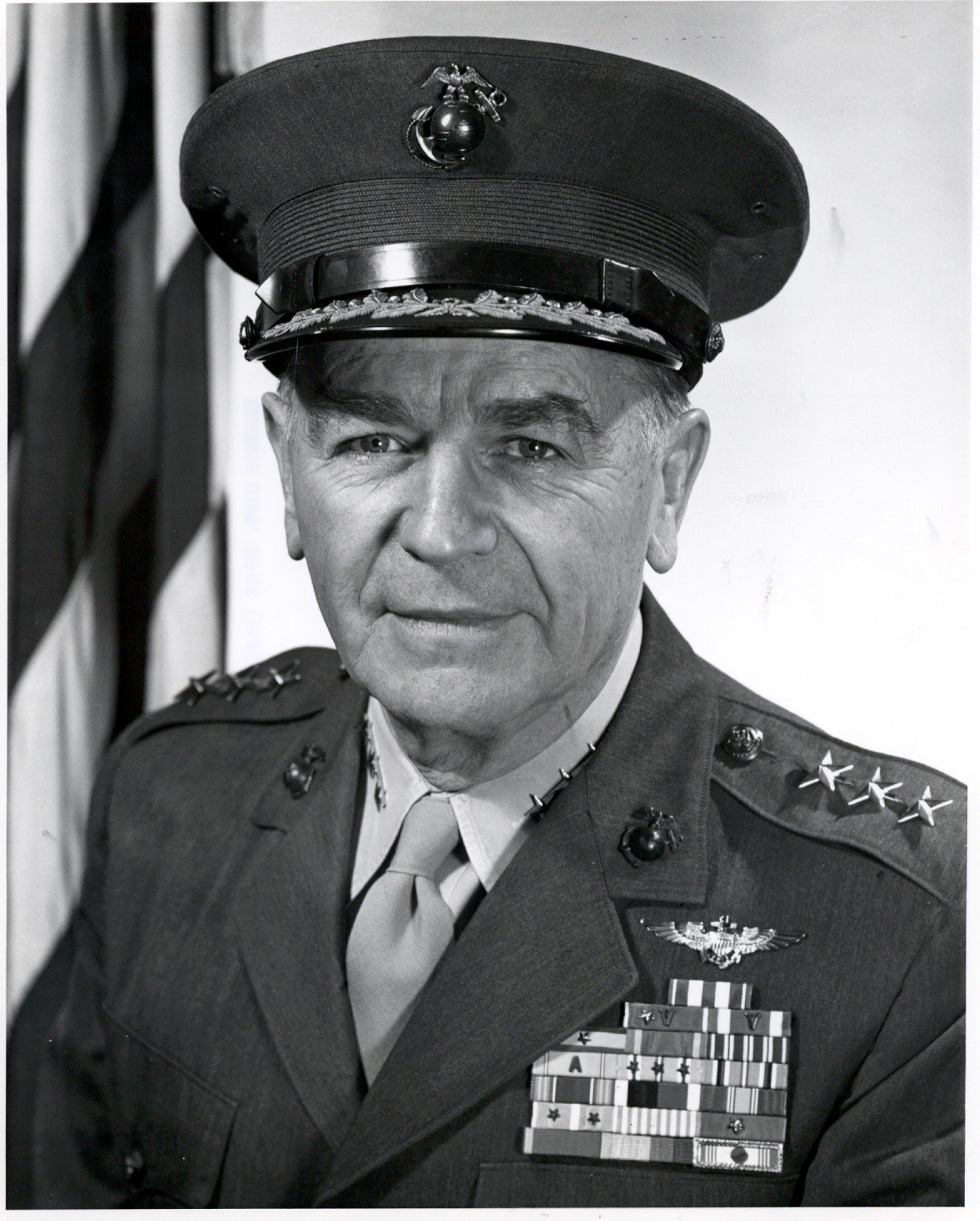
- Munn, circa 1964
- Born: October 17, 1906; Prescott, Arkansas, U.S.
- Died: April 14, 1986 (aged 79); Encinitas, California, U.S.
- Military career
- Allegiance: United States of America
- Branch: United States Marine Corps
- Service years: 1927–1964
- Rank: Lieutenant General
- Commands: Marine Aircraft Group 11; Marine Aircraft Group 31; Marine Wing Service Group Two (Provisional); Marine Corps Air Station El Toro; 2nd Marine Aircraft Wing; Assistant Commandant of the Marine Corps; Marine Corps Base Camp Pendleton
- Conflicts: Banana Wars; World War II; Korean War
- Awards: Silver Star; Legion of Merit (x2)

John Calvin Munn (17 October 1906 – 14 April 1986) was the 8th Assistant Commandant of the Marine Corps and United States Naval Aviator. He served for 37 years in the United States Marine Corps.

== Biography ==
Munn was born October 17, 1906, in Prescott, Arkansas, and after graduating from high school in 1923, he attended the United States Naval Academy. After graduating on 2 June 1927, he was commissioned as a second lieutenant, he attended Officers' Basic Course at the Philadelphia Navy Yard and was assigned to the 2nd Marine Brigade to participate in the United States occupation of Nicaragua. Returning to the United States in September 1929, he was assigned to the guard force at Herbert Hoover's summer camp near Criglersville for three months, then was ordered to attend aviation training at Hampton Roads.

In May 1930, Munn was sent for more training at Naval Air Station Pensacola and was winged the next January, serving there for two more months, then transferring to Naval Air Station San Diego. In October 1931, he joined Scouting Squadron 14-M, which embarked aboard USS Saratoga (CV-3) the following month (one of the first two Marine squadrons to serve aboard Navy carriers). He was promoted to first lieutenant in January 1934, then left the Saratoga in June to return to San Diego. There, he joined Bombing Squadron 4-M for two years' duty aboard USS Lexington (CV-2) and USS Langley (CV-1). In June 1936, he was assigned to aviation duty at Marine Corps Base Quantico, and promoted to captain in August.

In May 1938, Munn sailed for Colombia to serve as a Naval attaché at numerous American embassies in South America, including Colombia, Panama, Venezuela, Ecuador, and Peru. He returned to the United States in March 1941, and was stationed briefly in Washington, D.C., before being assigned to Marine Observation Squadron 151 of Marine Aircraft Group 11 at Quantico. He was promoted to major in July 1941, and would embark upon USS Ranger (CV-4) several times until VMO-151 sailed for San Diego in December upon the United States's entry into World War II.

Munn was promoted to lieutenant colonel in August 1942, and departed for the Pacific War. On 3 September 1942, he arrived on Guadalcanal in the first transport plane of the Cactus Air Force to land at Henderson Field during the Guadalcanal Campaign. While on Guadalcanal, he served in staff roles for the 1st 2nd Marine Aircraft Wings (G-2 and G-3, respectively). He would be awarded the Navy Commendation Medal with valor device for his role in the fighting there.

In March 1943, Munn assumed command of Marine Aircraft Group 11 in the New Hebrides, but returned to the United States in July, serving as the assistant head of the Aviation Planning Section for the United States Fleet in Washington until February 1945. While serving in this capacity, he was promoted to colonel in November 1943. In March 1945, Colonel Munn returned to the Pacific to take command of Marine Aircraft Group 31. Under his command, the unit destroyed 180 Japanese planes in the Battle of Okinawa, landing at Yontan Airfield on April 7. He was awarded the Silver Star and his first Legion of Merit, and commanded MAG-31 after the war's end until April 1946. After a month's temporary duty in Washington, he reported to Pearl Harbor in June 1946 as Aviation Plans Officer and Fleet Marine Officer for United States Pacific Fleet.

In June 1948, Munn transferred to Marine Corps Air Station Cherry Point to command Marine Wing Service Group Two (Provisional), serve as Chief of Staff of Air for Fleet Marine Force, Atlantic and 2nd Marine Aircraft Wing. He attended the National War College in August 1950 and graduated the following summer. In June 1951, he was named a member of the Joint Strategic Plans Group, of the Joint Staff, and served in that capacity until February 1952. He then served in the Division of Aviation at Headquarters Marine Corps as assistant director.

Munn was named chief of staff of the 1st Marine Aircraft Wing, and embarked for the Korean War in April 1953. While in Korea, he was awarded his second Legion of Merit and returned home in April 1954 to assume command of Marine Corps Air Station El Toro. While there, he was promoted to brigadier general in August 1954, then in October 1954, was transferred to Naval Station Norfolk as assistant commanding general for aircraft for Fleet Marine Force, Atlantic. Ordered to Washington in February 1955, he was assigned to the Office of the Vice Chief of Naval Operations as Marine Corps liaison officer, until October of the same year. He then served as Inspector General of the Marine Corps until January 1956, when he returned to Cherry Point to assume command of the 2nd Marine Aircraft Wing. He was promoted to major general in August 1956.

In February 1958, Munn became the director of aviation at Headquarters Marine Corps, until 1 January 1960, when he assumed the post of Assistant Commandant of the Marine Corps. With the post came a temporary promotion to lieutenant general, and served in this capacity through March 1963. Taking command of Marine Corps Base Camp Pendleton, he reverted to his permanent grade of major general. Upon his retirement on 1 July 1964, he was appointed by the president, and confirmed by the Senate, to the grade of lieutenant general on the retired list.

Munn died 14 April 1986 in Encinitas, California.

== Awards and decorations ==
Known decorations and medals include:

Naval Aviator Badge
1st row	Silver Star		Legion of Merit w/ 1 award star & valor device	
2nd row	Navy Commendation Medal w/ 1 award star & valor device	Navy Presidential Unit Citation w/ 1 service star	Navy Unit Commendation	Nicaraguan Campaign Medal
3rd row	American Defense Service Medal w/ Base clasp	American Campaign Medal	Asiatic-Pacific Campaign Medal w/ 2 service star	World War II Victory Medal
4th row	Navy Occupation Service Medal w/ Asia clasp	National Defense Service Medal w/ 1 service star	Korean Service Medal w/ 1 service star	Colombian Order of Boyaca with certificate
5th row	Ecuadorian Diploma of the Star of Abdon Calderon	Nicaraguan Presidential Medal of Merit with Star	Korean Presidential Unit Citation	United Nations Korea Medal

Military offices
Preceded by Verne J. McCaul	Assistant Commandant of the Marine Corps; January 1, 1960 — March 31, 1963	Succeeded by Charles H. Hayes
Preceded by Samuel S. Jack	Director of Aviation; February 21, 1958 — December 14, 1959	Succeeded by Albert F. Binney

== See also ==
- United States Marine Corps Aviation
