= Ralph B. DeWitt =

American Marine Corps Brigadier General

Ralph Birchard DeWitt
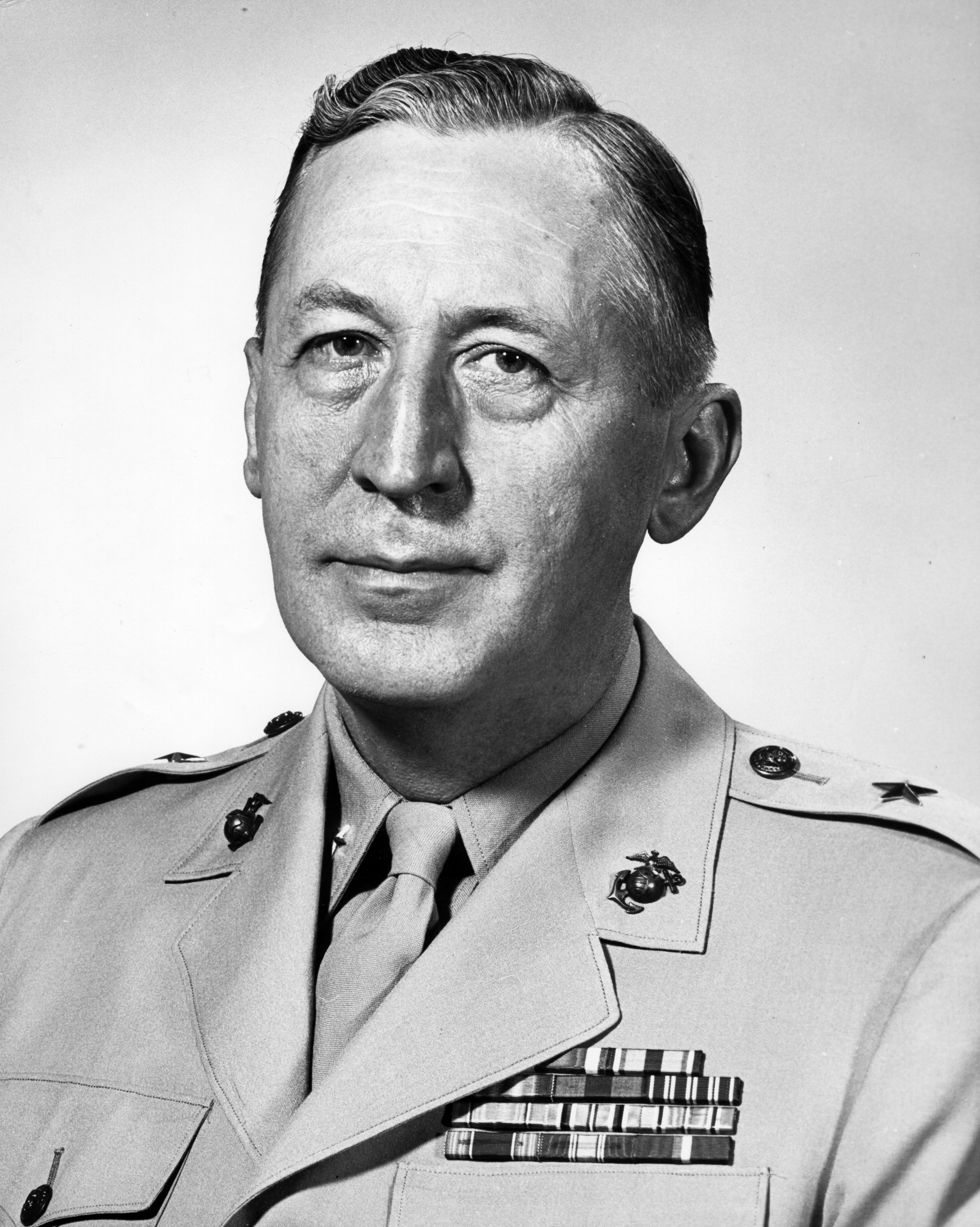
- BG Ralph B. DeWitt, USMC
- Born: June 8, 1901; Newfane, Vermont, US
- Died: January 2, 1974 (aged 72); Brattleboro, Vermont, US
- Burial place: Arlington National Cemetery
- Military career
- Allegiance: United States of America
- Branch: United States Marine Corps
- Service years: 1922–1958
- Rank: Brigadier general
- Service number: 0-3793
- Commands: Marine Supply Center Barstow
- Conflicts: Haitian Campaign; Nicaraguan Campaign; World War II
- Awards: Navy Commendation Medal

Ralph Birchard DeWitt (June 8, 1901 – January 2, 1974) was an officer in the United States Marine Corps with the rank of brigadier general. The United States Naval Academy graduate, he spent his career mostly in Quartermaster Department and completed his service as commanding general, Marine Supply Center Barstow.

== Early career ==
DeWitt was born on June 8, 1901, in Newfane, Vermont, as the son of Frank Austin and Lena Ware DeWitt. He attended the high school in Chester, Vermont, and subsequently received appointment to the United States Naval Academy at Annapolis, Maryland, in July 1918. DeWitt graduated in June 1922 with bachelor's degree and was commissioned second lieutenant in the Marine Corps on that date.

During his time at the academy, DeWitt was active in fencing and also was a member of the editorial staff of the Log, the Midshipmen magazine. Many of his classmates became general officers later: Hyman G. Rickover, Robert E. Blick Jr., Herbert S. Duckworth, Clayton C. Jerome, James P. Riseley, James A. Stuart, Frank Peak Akers, Sherman Clark, Raymond P. Coffman, Delbert S. Cornwell, Frederick J. Eckhoff, Hugh H. Goodwin, John Higgins, Vernon Huber, Michael J. Malanaphy, William S. Parsons, Albert K. Morehouse, Harold F. Pullen, Harold R. Stevens, John P. Whitney, Lyman G. Miller and George J. O'Shea.

Following his graduation, DeWitt was ordered to the Basic School at Marine Barracks Quantico for basic officer training, which he completed in April 1923. He was then attached to the 2nd Marine Regiment and ordered with 1st Marine Brigade to Haiti. DeWitt participated in the jungle patrols against Cacos bandits until May 1925, when he returned to the United States.

Upon his return stateside, DeWitt assumed duty as detachment commander of the Marine barracks at Naval Submarine Base New London, Connecticut. He held this assignment until August 1926, when he was transferred to the Marine barracks at Naval Ammunition Depot at Dover, Delaware. While in this capacity, he was promoted to first lieutenant on October 1, 1926. A tour of duty with the recruiting office in Cleveland, Ohio, followed in March 1927 when he was appointed Officer-in-Charge of the Recruiting Office.

DeWitt was appointed commander of the Marine detachment aboard the cruiser USS Denver in May 1928 and served ashore on the East Coast of Nicaragua expeditionary duty during the restoration of order during a period of rebel uprisings. Due to Great Depression and cuts in the Marine Corps budget, DeWitt was forced to resign his commission in the Marine Corps on April 9, 1930.

He subsequently entered the Marine Corps Reserve and rose to the rank of captain during the next ten years. During his civilian career, DeWitt worked as an electrical rate engineer for Virginia Public Service Company in Alexandria, Virginia, until summer 1940. For his service with the Marine Corps Reserve, DeWitt received Reserve Good Conduct Medal.

== World War II ==
DeWitt was recalled to active duty as a major on August 1, 1940, and was ordered to the Industrial College of the Armed Forces in Washington, D.C., for instruction. Upon the graduation in December of that year, he was promoted to lieutenant colonel and appointed officer in charge of War Plans and Statistical Division, Quartermaster Department, Headquarters Marine Corps. DeWitt served under Major General Seth Williams until August 1944 and during that period, he was promoted to colonel in April 1944.

He was subsequently ordered to Hawaii, where he joined 8th Field Depot as commanding officer of Rear Echelon. He was later reassigned at Pearl Harbor to become officer in charge of Planning Division, Supply Service, Fleet Marine Force, Pacific under Lieutenant General Holland Smith. DeWitt remained in that capacity until June 1945 and received the Navy Commendation Medal for his service at Pearl Harbor.

== Later service ==
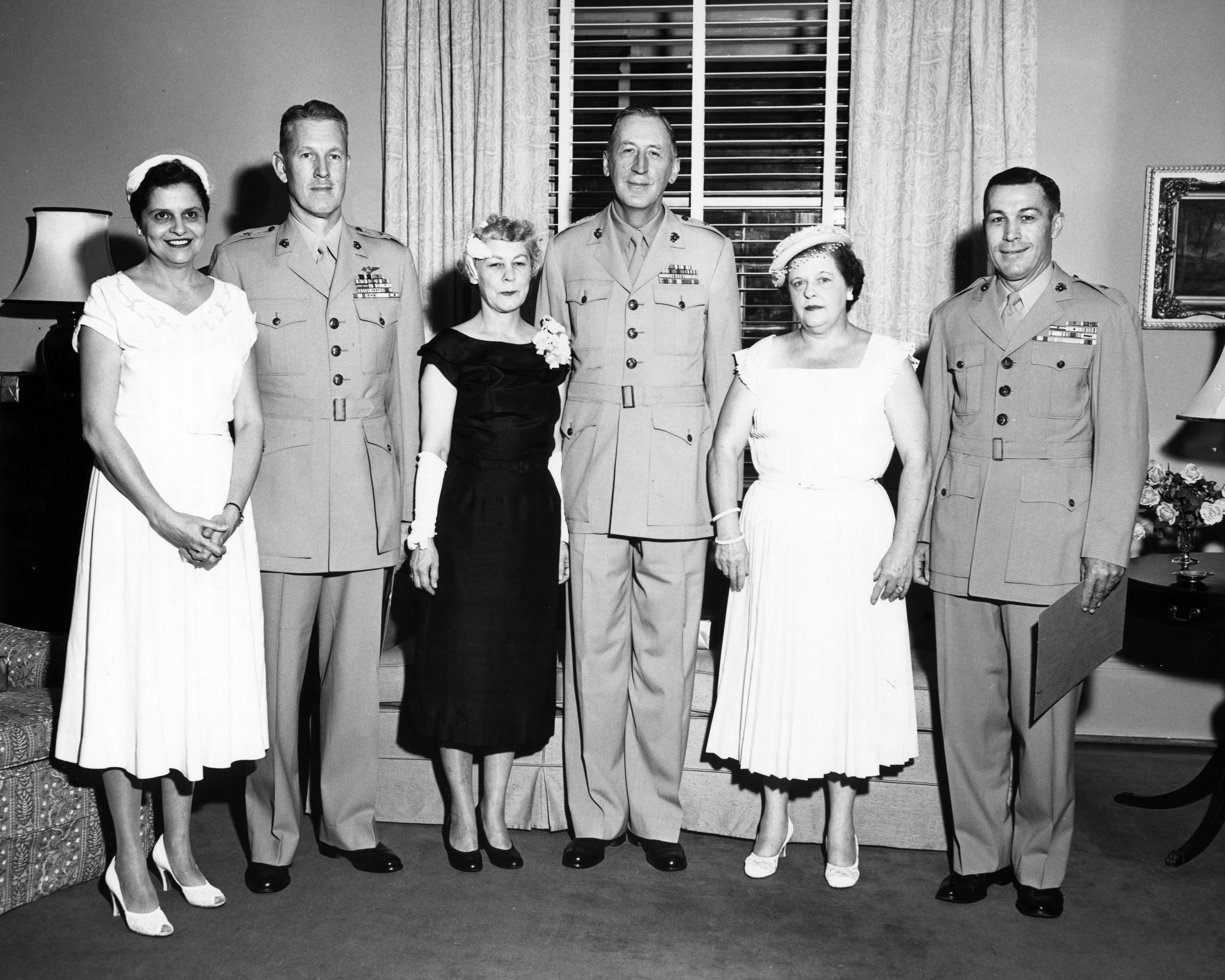
Three newly promoted Brigadier generals: Richard C. Mangrum, DeWitt and Frederick L. Wieseman with their wives.

DeWitt saw duty on Luzon from July to September 1945 as Chief of Supply, Marine Corps Section, U.S. Army Forces, Western Pacific, in connection with advanced planning with the army for the intended invasion of Japan. He returned to the United States in February 1946 and was appointed Officer-in-Charge of the Supply Division, Depot of Supplies, Philadelphia. He served under Brigadier General Leonard E. Rea and was selected for integration into the Regular Marine Corps in July 1946.

He was transferred to Camp Pendleton in July 1946 and assumed command of Supply Depot there. DeWitt was ordered to the Naval War College at Newport, Rhode Island, in July 1952 and completed a course in strategy and logistics one year later. He was subsequently transferred to Washington, D.C., and attached to the Supply Department at Headquarters Marine Corps. DeWitt served as assistant to the executive officer of the supply department and was promoted to brigadier general on July 1, 1956.

DeWitt assumed his final assignment as commanding general of Marine Supply Center Barstow in February 1957. In this capacity, he commanded 2,300 civilian personnel and 1,300 Marines and was responsible for the supplying of all Marine Forces West of Mississippi River. His command handled the maintenance of physical facilities and provided approximately 840 pieces of motorized vehicles, including trucks and warehouse equipment. Further, his Repair Division of the center provided repair services and overhaul for LVTs, tanks, buses and trucks.

== Retirement and death ==
DeWitt retired from the Marine Corps on August 1, 1958, after almost 30 years of service and settled in Alameda County, California, and worked as secretary for Pacific State Mortgage Company. He then moved back to Vermont, where he died on January 2, 1974, in the town of Brattleboro. He is buried at Morningside Cemetery together with his wife, Helen Bliss DeWitt (1901–1970). They had together three sons: Birchard B., Randolph A. and John B.

== Decorations ==
Here is the ribbon bar of Brigadier General DeWitt:

1st Row	Navy Commendation Medal		Reserve Good Conduct Medal
2nd Row	World War I Victory Medal	Marine Corps Expeditionary Medal	Second Nicaraguan Campaign Medal
3rd Row	American Defense Service Medal	American Campaign Medal	Asiatic-Pacific Campaign Medal
4th Row	World War II Victory Medal	National Defense Service Medal	Philippine Liberation Medal

== See also ==
- Marine Supply Center Albany
- Roy M. Gulick
- Chester R. Allen

Military offices
Preceded by Roy M. Gulick	Commanding General, Marine Supply Center Barstow; February 1, 1957 - August 1, 1958	Succeeded by George H. Cloud
