= Hugh H. Goodwin =

United States Navy admiral

Hugh Hilton Goodwin
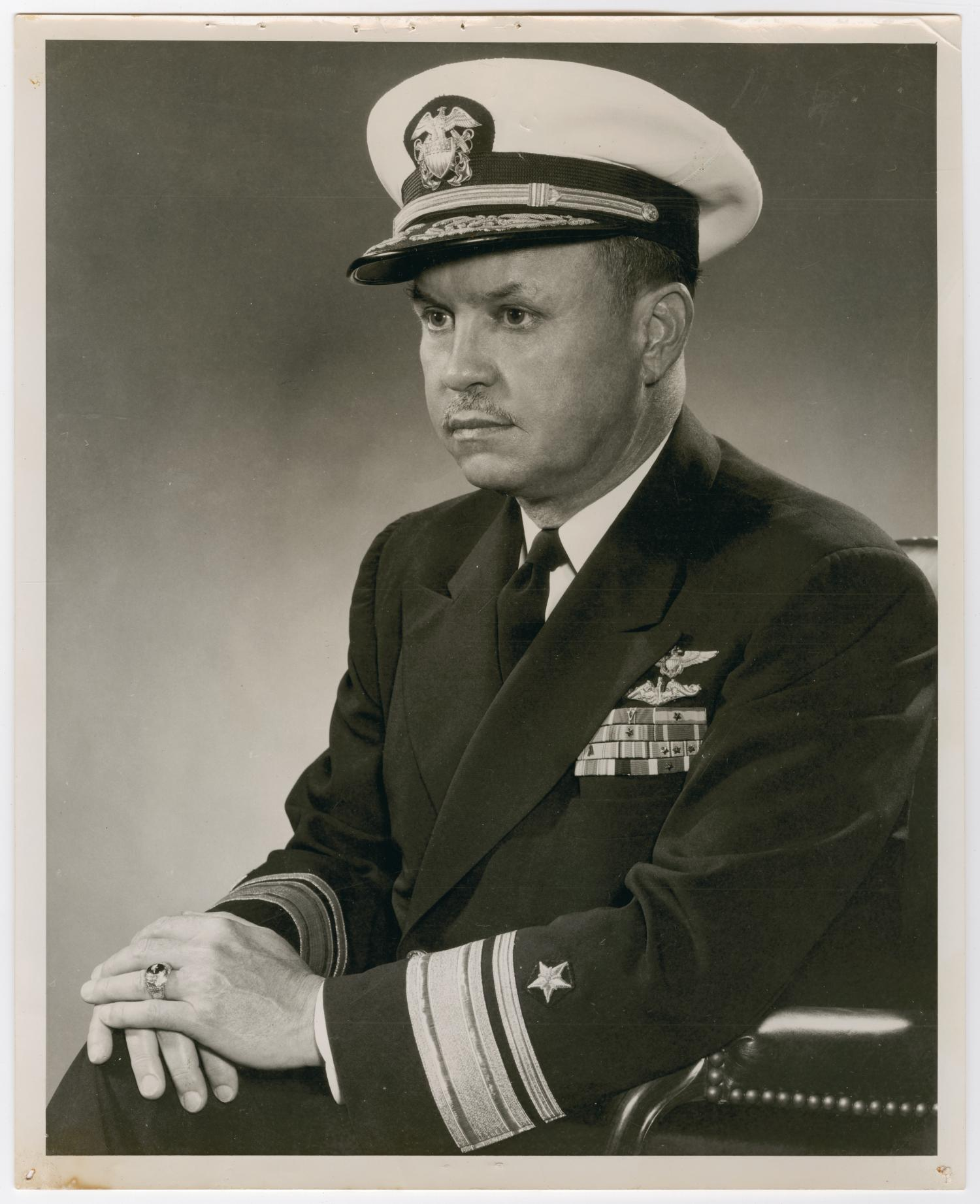
- Goodwin as Rear admiral, USN
- Born: December 21, 1900; Monroe, Louisiana, U.S.
- Died: February 25, 1980 (aged 79); Monterey, California, U.S.
- Military career
- Allegiance: United States of America
- Branch: United States Navy
- Service years: 1917–1957
- Rank: Vice Admiral
- Nickname: "Huge"
- Commands: Carrier Division Two; Vice Commander, MATS; USS San Jacinto (CVL-30); USS Gambier Bay
- Conflicts: World War I: Battle of the Atlantic; World War II: Battle of Saipan; Battle of Tinian; Recapture of Guam; Battle of Leyte Gulf; Battle of Okinawa
- Awards: Legion of Merit; Bronze Star Medal

Hugh Hilton Goodwin (December 21, 1900 – February 25, 1980) was a decorated officer in the United States Navy with the rank of vice admiral. A veteran of both World Wars, he commanded escort carrier USS Gambier Bay (CVE-73) during the Mariana Islands campaign. Goodwin then served consecutively as chief of staff, Carrier Strike Group 6 and as air officer, Philippine Sea Frontier and participated in the Philippines campaign in the later part of the war.

Following the war, he remained in the Navy and rose to the flag rank and held several important commands, including vice commander, Military Air Transport Service, commander, Carrier Division Two and commander, Naval Air Forces, Continental Air Defense Command.

== Early life and career ==
Goodwin was born on December 21, 1900, in Monroe, Louisiana, and attended Monroe High School there (now Neville High School). Following the United States' entry into World War I in April 1917, Goodwin left the school without receiving the diploma in order to see some combat and enlisted the United States Navy on May 7, 1917. He completed basic training and was assigned to the battleship USS Delaware (BB-28). Goodwin participated in the training of armed guard crews and engine room personnel as the Atlantic Fleet prepared to go to war and in November 1917, he sailed with the rest of Battleship Division 9, bound for Britain to reinforce the Grand Fleet in the North Sea.

Although he did not complete the last year of high school, Goodwin was able to earn an appointment to the United States Naval Academy at Annapolis, Maryland, in June 1918. While at the academy, he earned a nickname "Huge" and among his classmates were several future admirals and generals including: Hyman G. Rickover, Milton E. Miles, Robert E. Blick Jr., Herbert S. Duckworth, Clayton C. Jerome, James P. Riseley, James A. Stuart, Frank Peak Akers, Sherman Clark, Raymond P. Coffman, Delbert S. Cornwell, Frederick J. Eckhoff, Ralph B. DeWitt, John Higgins, Vernon Huber, Albert K. Morehouse, Harold F. Pullen, Michael J. Malanaphy, William S. Parsons, Harold R. Stevens, John P. Whitney, Lyman G. Miller and George J. O'Shea.

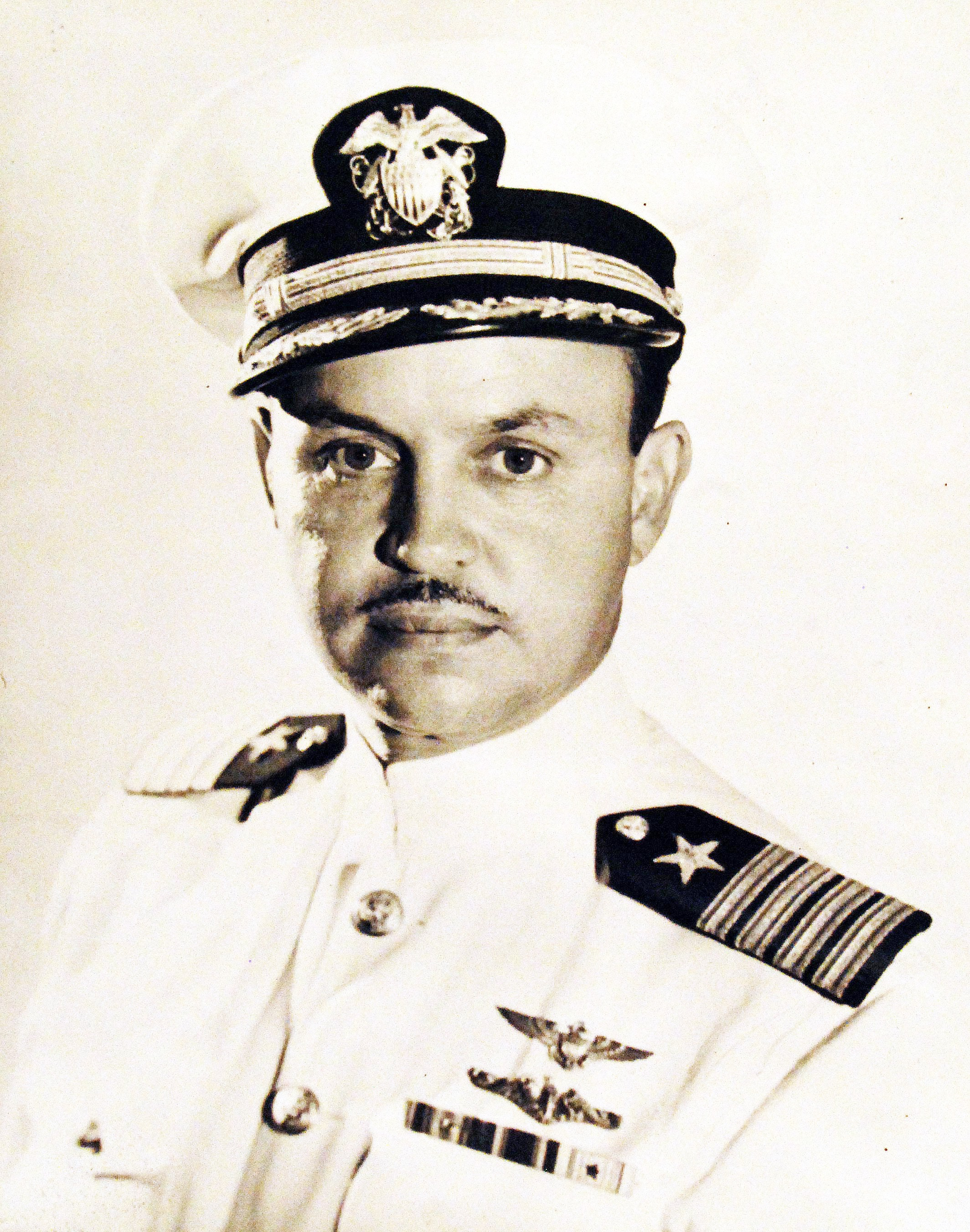
Goodwin as captain in early 1944.

Goodwin graduated with Bachelor of Science degree on June 3, 1922, and was commissioned ensign in the United States Navy. He was subsequently assigned to the battleship USS Nevada (BB-36) and took part in the voyage to Rio de Janeiro, Brazil, before he was ordered to the Naval Torpedo Station at Newport, Rhode Island, for submarine instruction in June 1923. Goodwin completed the training several weeks later and was attached to the submarine USS S-33. He then continued his further training aboard submarine USS S-39 and following his promotion to lieutenant (junior grade) on June 3, 1925, he qualified as submariner.

He then served aboard submarine USS S-25 off the coast of California, before he was ordered for the recruiting duty to San Francisco in September 1927. While in this capacity, Goodwin applied for naval aviation training which was ultimately approved and he was ordered to the Naval Air Station Pensacola, Florida, in August 1928. Toward the end of the training, he was promoted to lieutenant on December 11, 1928, and upon the completion of the training in January 1929, he was designated Naval aviator.

Goodwin was subsequently attached to the observation squadron aboard the aircraft carrier USS Saratoga and participated in the Fleet exercises in the Caribbean. He was transferred to the Bureau of Aeronautics in Washington, D.C., in August 1931 and served consecutively under the architect of naval aviation William A. Moffett and future Chief of Naval Operations Ernest J. King.

In June 1933, Goodwin was ordered to the Naval War College at Newport, Rhode Island, where he completed junior course in May of the following year. He subsequently joined the crew of aircraft carrier USS Lexington and served under Captain Arthur B. Cook and took part in the Fleet exercises in the Caribbean and off the East Coast of the United States.

He was ordered back to the Naval Air Station Pensacola, Florida, in June 1936 and was attached to the staff of the Base Commandant, then-Captain Charles A. Blakely. When Blakely was succeeded by William F. Halsey in June 1937, Goodwin remained in Halsey's staff and was promoted to lieutenant commander on December 1, 1937. He also completed correspondence course in International law at the Naval War College.

Goodwin was appointed commanding officer of the Observation Squadron 1 in June 1938 and attached to the battleship USS Arizona he took part in the patrolling of the Pacific and West Coast of the United States until September 1938, when he assumed command of the Observation Squadron 2 attached to the battleship USS Tennessee.

When his old superior from Lexington, now Rear Admiral Arthur B. Cook, was appointed commander, aircraft, Scouting Force in June 1939, he requested Goodwin as his Aide and Flag Secretary. He became Admiral Cook's protégé and after year and half of service in the Pacific, he continued as his aide and flag secretary, when Cook was appointed commander, aircraft, Atlantic Fleet in November 1940.

== World War II ==
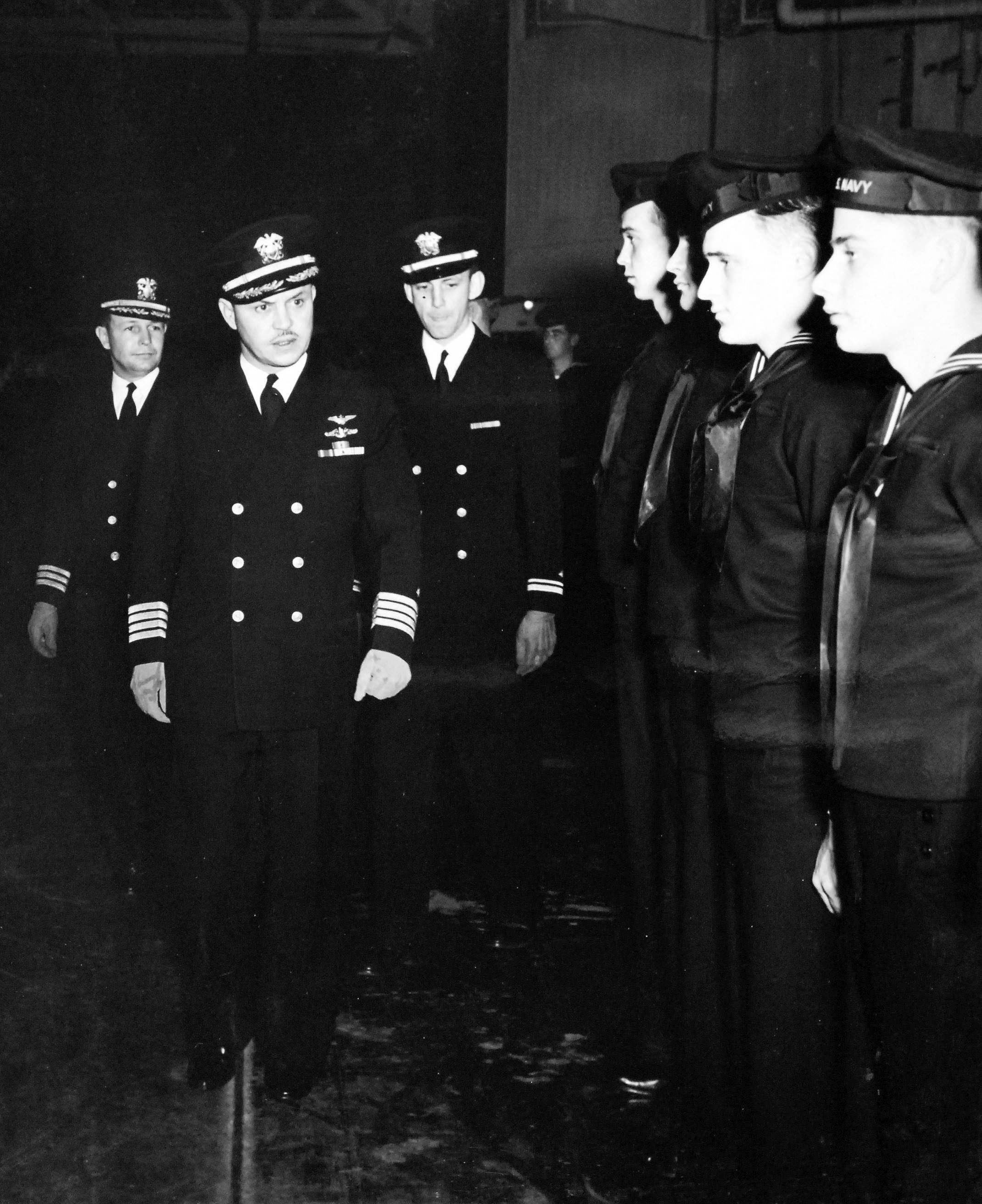
Goodwin during inspection of USS Gambier Bay crew in January 1944.

Following the United States' entry into World War II, Goodwin was promoted to the temporary rank of commander on January 1, 1942, and assumed duty as advisor to the Argentine Navy. His promotion was made permanent two months later and he returned to the United States in early 1943 for duty as assistant director of Planning in the Bureau of Aeronautics under Rear admiral John S. McCain. While still in Argentina, Goodwin was promoted to the temporary rank of captain on June 21, 1942.

By the end of December 1943, Goodwin was ordered to Astoria, Oregon, where he assumed command of newly commissioned escort carrier USS Gambier Bay. He was responsible for the initial training of the crew and was known as a strict disciplinarian, but the crew appreciated the skills he taught them that prepared them for combat. Goodwin insisted that everyone aboard has to do every job right every time and made us fight our ship at her best.

During the first half of 1944, Gambier Bay was tasked with ferrying aircraft for repairs and qualified carrier pilots from San Diego to Pearl Harbor, Hawaii, before departed on May 1, 1944, to join Rear admiral Harold B. Sallada's Carrier Support Group 2, staging in the Marshalls for the invasion of the Marianas.

The air unit, VC-10 Squadron, under Goodwin's command gave close air support to the initial landings of Marines on Saipan on June 15, 1944, destroying enemy gun emplacements, troops, tanks, and trucks. On the 17th, her combat air patrol (CAP) shot down or turned back all but a handful of 47 enemy planes headed for her task group and her gunners shot down two of the three planes that did break through to attack her.

Goodwin's carrier continued in providing of close ground support operations at Tinian during the end of July 1944, then turned her attention to Guam, where she gave identical aid to invading troops until mid-August that year. For his service during the Mariana Islands campaign, Goodwin was decorated with Bronze Star Medal with Combat "V".

He was succeeded by Captain Walter V. R. Vieweg on August 18, 1944, and appointed Chief of Staff, Carrier Division Six under Rear admiral Arthur W. Radford. The Gambier Bay was sunk in the Battle off Samar on October 25, 1944, during the Battle of Leyte Gulf after helping turn back a much larger attacking Japanese surface force.

Goodwin served with Carrier Division Six during the Bonin Islands raids, the naval operations at Palau and took part in the Battle of Leyte Gulf and operations supporting Leyte landings in late 1944. He was later appointed Air Officer of the Philippine Sea Frontier under Rear admiral James L. Kauffman and remained with that command until the end of hostilities. For his service in the later part of World War II, Goodwin was decorated with Legion of Merit with Combat "V". He was also entitled to wear two Navy Presidential Unit Citations and Navy Unit Commendation.

== Postwar service ==
Following the surrender of Japan, Goodwin assumed command of Light aircraft carrier USS San Jacinto on August 24, 1945. The ship was tasked with air missions over Japan became mercy flights over Allied prisoner-of-war camps, dropping food and medicine until the men could be rescued. She was also present at Tokyo Bay for the Japanese surrender on September 2, 1945.

Goodwin returned with San Jacinto to the United States in mid-September 1945 and he was detached in January 1946. He subsequently served in the office of the Chief of Naval Operations until May that year, when he entered the instruction at National War College. Goodwin graduated in June 1947 and served on Secretary's committee for Research on Reorganization. Upon promotion to rear admiral on April 1, 1949, Goodwin was appointed chief of staff and aide to Commander-in-Chief, Atlantic Fleet under Admiral William H. P. Blandy.

=== Revolt of the Admirals ===
In April 1949, the budget's cuts and proposed reorganization of the United States Armed Forces by the Secretary of Defense Louis A. Johnson launched the wave of discontent between senior commanders in the United States Navy. Johnson proposed the merging of the Marine Corps into the Army, and reduce the Navy to a convoy-escort force.

Goodwin's superior officer, Admiral Blandy was call to testify before the House Committee on Armed Services and his harsh statements for the defense of the Navy, costed him his career. Goodwin shared his views and openly criticized Secretary Johnson for having power concentrated in a single civilian executive, who is an appointee of the Government and not an elected representative of the people. He also criticized aspects of defense unification which permitted the Joint Chiefs of Staff to vote on arms policies of individual services, and thus "rob" the branches of autonomy.

The outbreak of the Korean War in summer 1950 proved the proposal of Secretary Johnson as incorrect and he resigned in September that year. Also Secretary of the Navy, Francis P. Matthews resigned one month earlier.

=== Later service ===
Due to the Revolts of the admirals, Blandy was forced to retire in February 1950 and Goodwin was ordered to Newport, Rhode Island, for temporary duty as chief of staff and aide to the President of the Naval War College under Vice Admiral Donald B. Beary in April 1950. Goodwin was detached from that assignment two months and appointed member of the General Board of the Navy. He was shortly thereafter appointed acting Navy Chief of Public Information, as the substitute for Rear Admiral Russell S. Berkey, who was relieved of illness, but returned to the General Board of the Navy in July that year. Goodwin served in that capacity until February 1951, when he relieved his academy class, Rear Admiral John P. Whitney as Vice Commander, Military Air Transport Service (MATS).

While in this capacity, Goodwin served under Lieutenant General Laurence S. Kuter and was co-responsible for the logistical support of United Nations troops fighting in Korea. The MATS operated from the United States to Japan and Goodwin served in this capacity until August 1953, when he was appointed Commander Carrier Division Two. While in this assignment, he took part in the Operation Mariner, Joint Anglo-American exercise which encountered very heavy seas over a two-week period in fall 1953.

Goodwin was ordered to the Philippines in May 1954 and assumed duty as commander, U.S. Naval Forces in the Philippines with headquarters at Naval Station Sangley Point near Cavite. He held that command in the period of tensions between Taiwan and China and publicly declared shortly after his arrival, that any attack on Taiwan by the Chinese Communists on the mainland would result in US participation in the conflict. The naval fighter planes under his command also provided escort for passing commercial planes. Goodwin worked together with retired Admiral Raymond A. Spruance, then-Ambassador to the Philippines, and accompanied him during the visits to Singapore, Bangkok and Saigon in January 1955.

On December 18, 1955, Goodwin's classmate Rear Admiral Albert K. Morehouse, then serving as commander, Naval Air Forces, Continental Air Defense Command (CONAD), died of heart attack and Goodwin was ordered to CONAD headquarters in Colorado Springs, Colorado, to assume Morehouse's position. While in this capacity, he was subordinated to Army General Earle E. Partridge and was responsible for the Naval and Marine Forces allocated to the command designated for the defense of the Continental United States.

== Retirement ==
Goodwin retired on June 1, 1957, after 40 years of active service and was advanced to the rank of vice admiral on the retired list for having been specially commended in combat. A week later, he was invited back to his Monroe High School (now Neville High School) and handed a diploma showing that he had been graduated with the class of 1918. He then settled in Monterey, California, where he taught American history at Stevenson school and was a member of the Naval Order of the United States.

Vice admiral Hugh H. Goodwin died at his home on February 25, 1980, aged 79. He was survived by his wife, Eleanor with whom he had two children, a daughter Sidney and a son Hugh Jr., who graduated from the Naval Academy in June 1948, but died one year later, when the Hellcat fighter he was piloting collided with another over the Gulf of Mexico during training.

== Decorations ==
Here is the ribbon bar of Vice admiral Hugh H. Goodwin:

Naval Aviator Badge
Submarine Warfare insignia
1st Row	Legion of Merit with Combat "V"		
2nd Row	Bronze Star Medal with Combat "V"	Navy Presidential Unit Citation with one star	Navy Unit Commendation
3rd Row	World War I Victory Medal with Atlantic Fleet Clasp	Yangtze Service Medal	American Defense Service Medal with "A" Device
4th Row	American Campaign Medal	Asiatic-Pacific Campaign Medal with three bronze 3/16" service stars	World War II Victory Medal
5th Row	Navy Occupation Service Medal	National Defense Service Medal	Philippine Liberation Medal with two stars
