= James P. Riseley =

United States Marine Corps general

James Profit Riseley
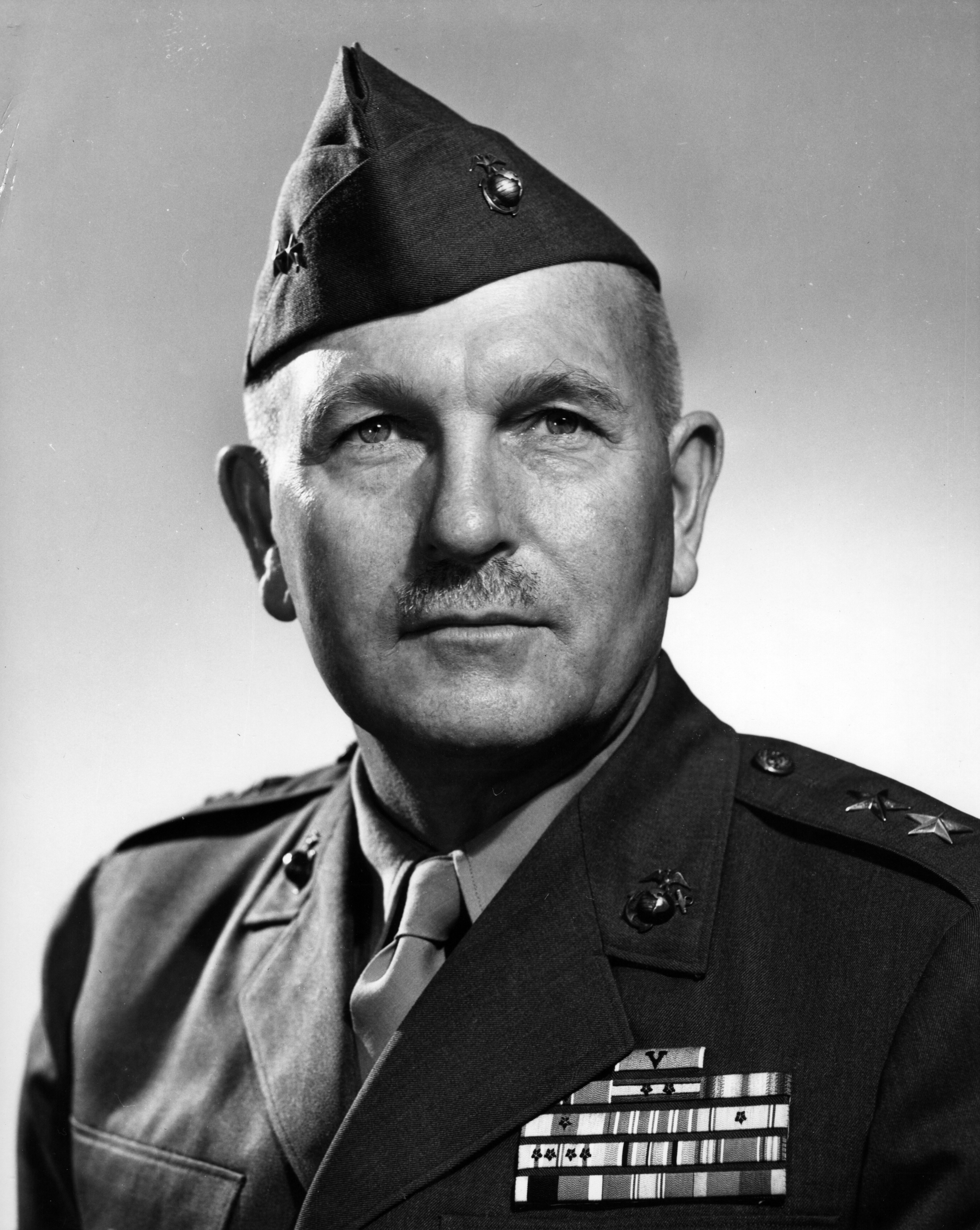
- Riseley as major general, USMC
- Born: May 7, 1898; Shandaken, New York, U.S.
- Died: March 2, 1992 (aged 93); Roswell, New Mexico, U.S.
- Military career
- Allegiance: United States of America
- Branch: United States Marine Corps
- Service years: 1918–1959
- Rank: Lieutenant general
- Service number: 0–3807
- Commands: Marine Corps Base Camp Lejeune; 3rd Marine Division; 6th Marine Regiment
- Conflicts: Haitian Campaign; Nicaraguan Campaign; World War II: Guadalcanal Campaign; Battle of Tarawa; Battle of Saipan; Battle of Tinian
- Awards: Legion of Merit; Bronze Star Medal

James Profit Riseley (May 7, 1898 – March 2, 1992) was a decorated officer of the United States Marine Corps, who reached the rank of lieutenant general. He is most noted as commanding officer of the 6th Marine Regiment during World War II. He later commanded 3rd Marine Division or Marine Corps Base Camp Lejeune.

== Early career ==
James P. Riseley was born on May 7, 1898, in Shandaken, New York, and following the high school, he attended the United States Naval Academy at Annapolis, Maryland. During his time at the academy, he was active in soccer team and graduated in June 1922 with bachelor's degree.

Many of his classmates became general officers later: Hyman G. Rickover, Robert E. Blick Jr., Herbert S. Duckworth, Clayton C. Jerome, James A. Stuart, Frank Peak Akers, Sherman Clark, Raymond P. Coffman, Delbert S. Cornwell, Frederick J. Eckhoff, Ralph B. DeWitt, Milton E. Miles, Hugh H. Goodwin, John Higgins, Vernon Huber, Albert K. Morehouse, Harold F. Pullen, Harold R. Stevens, John P. Whitney, Michael J. Malanaphy, William S. Parsons, Lyman G. Miller and George J. O'Shea.

Following his graduation, he was commissioned second lieutenant in the Marine Corps and ordered to The Basic School at Marine Corps Base Quantico for basic officer training. His first combat assignment was when Riseley was assigned to the 8th Marine Regiment and sailed within 1st Marine Brigade under Brigadier General Ben H. Fuller to Haiti. He was stationed at Port-au-Prince until October 1925, when he was ordered back to the United States. Assigned back to the Naval Academy, Riseley was appointed quartermaster of the local marine barracks and served in that capacity until February 1927.

He was subsequently transferred to the Marine Corps Recruit Depot Parris Island, South Carolina and appointed Aide-de-camp to commanding general of the 2nd Brigade of Marines, Brigadier General Logan Feland. The 2nd Brigade was sent to Nicaragua in January 1928, but Riseley has been transferred back to Haiti in April of that year. He was subsequently appointed captain within Garde d'Haïti and commanded constabulary unit of the Pétion-Ville district. Riseley spent next five years in that capacity and was decorated with Haitian Distinguished Service Medal with Diploma for his service there.

Riseley has returned to the United States in May 1933 and was ordered to the Marine Corps Schools at Quantico Base, where he attended Company Officers Course. He later attended Army Cavalry School at Fort Riley, Kansas. Upon the graduation in June 1937, Riseley returned to Quantico and was appointed an instructor in the Marine Corps Schools. In August 1939, he was appointed Senior Marine Officer on the staff of the Battleship Division Three.

== World War II ==
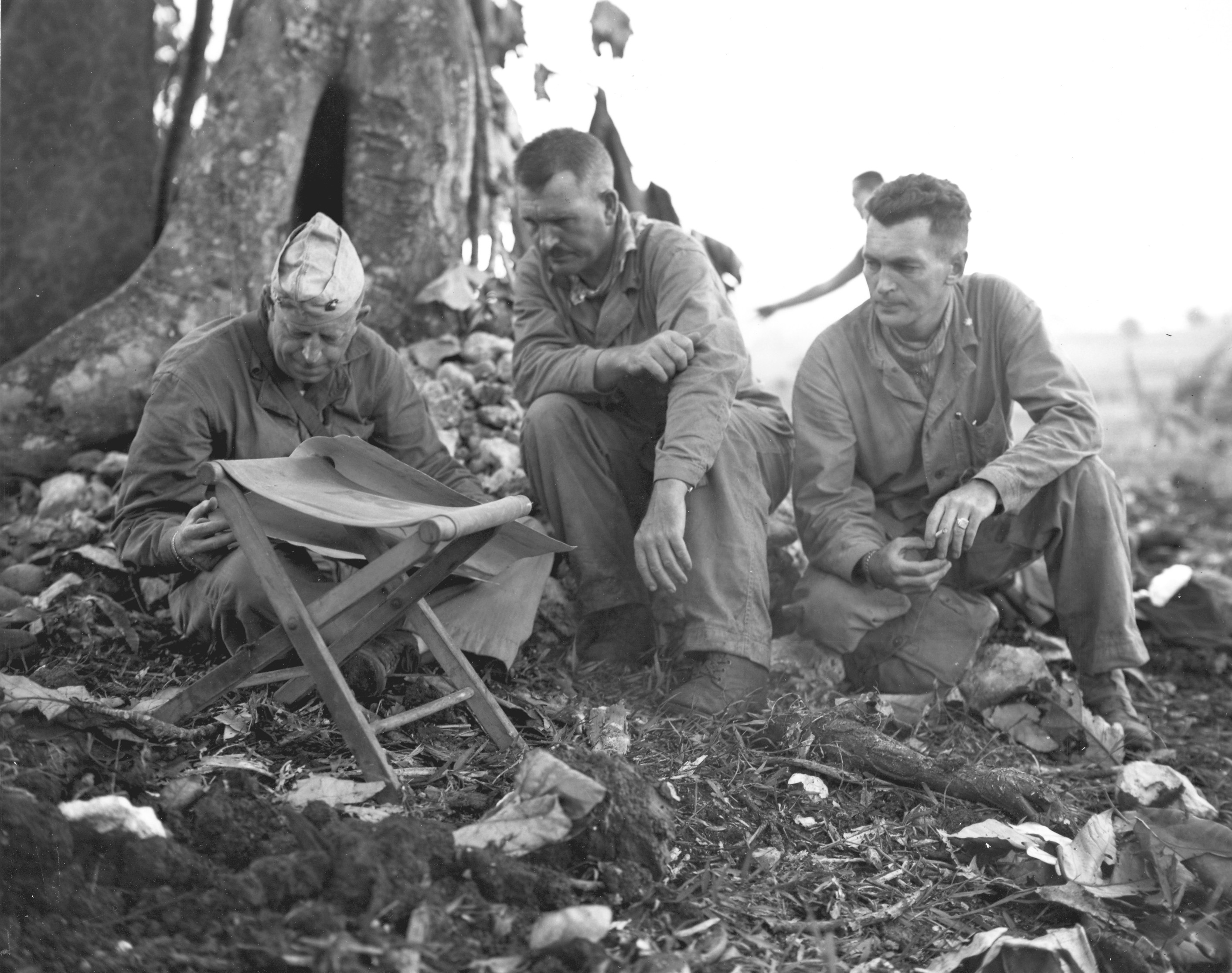
BG Merritt A. Edson, Assistant Division Commander, 2nd Marine Division, confers with Colonel James P. Riseley (CO 6th Marines) and LtCol Kenneth F. McLeod (XO 6th Marines) in June 1944 at Saipan.

Riseley has been appointed commanding officer of the 3rd Battalion, 8th Marines in August 1941 and following the Japanese attack on Pearl Harbor, he was appointed 8th Marine Regiment's executive officer to Colonel Richard H. Jeschke. His unit was subsequently attached to the 2nd Marine Division under Major General John Marston and sailed for Pacific during October 1942.

After the brief tour of garrison duty at Samoa, his regiment participated in the Battle of Guadalcanal and Riseley had been decorated with the Bronze Star Medal with Combat "V" for his service during the campaign. He also received his first Navy Presidential Unit Citation. Riseley followed his regiment back to Wellington, New Zealand, where they prepared for their next combat assignment – Tarawa.

He was subsequently assigned duties as assistant chief of staff and operations officer of the 2nd Marine Division, now under Major General Julian C. Smith and was tasked with the special assignment to experiment with the landing of tanks, amphibious tractors, and rubber boats on coral reefs under various surf conditions. Information gained in these tests was applied at Tarawa and later landings. He has been decorated with second Navy Presidential Unit Citation for Tarawa campaign.

Riseley remained in this capacity until December 17, 1943, when he relieved Colonel Maurice G. Holmes as commanding officer of the 6th Marine Regiment. During the summer of 1944, Colonel Riseley led his regiment ashore during the combats at Saipan and Tinian. He was subsequently decorated with the Legion of Merit with Combat "V" and third Navy Presidential Unit Citation for his leadership during the campaign. However, at the beginning of September 1944, Riseley relinquished his command to Colonel Gregon A. Williams and returned to the United States the following month.

Following his return, Riseley reported to the Headquarters Marine Corps in Washington, D.C., and subsequently was appointed commanding officer of the Marine barracks at Camp Pendleton, California in November 1944. He remained in this capacity until March 1945, when he attended the Army and Navy Staff College. Upon the graduation in September 1945, Riseley was assigned to the staff of Fifth Fleet under admiral Raymond A. Spruance as Marine Fleet Officer. He subsequently participated in the Occupation duties in the Japanese waters until April 1946.

== Later career ==
He was subsequently assigned as the operations and training officer of the Troop Training Unit, Amphibious Training Command, Coronado, California, under the command of Major General John T. Walker. Riseley was appointed Professor of Naval Science and Commander of Naval Reserve Officers Training Corps unit at Princeton University in June 1949.

While serving in this capacity, Riseley was promoted to the rank of brigadier general in January 1951 and subsequently assigned the duties of chief of staff of the Marine Corps School at Quantico base in July 1951. Riseley was transferred to Kāneʻohe Bay, where he took command of First Provisional Marine Air-Ground Task Force at Marine Corps Base Hawaii. While in Hawaii, he was promoted to the rank of Major General in September 1953. His next assignment came in October 1953, when he has been assigned duties as the deputy commander of the Marine Corps Base at Camp Pendleton.

Riseley relieved Major General Robert H. Pepper as commanding general of the 3rd Marine Division, which was located in Japan in May 1954. The 3rd Division served as defense force of the Far Eastern area. He was finally relieved by Major General Thomas A. Wornham at the end of June 1955 and returned to Hawaii. Riseley was assigned to duty Naval Base Pearl Harbor as deputy commander, Fleet Marine Force, Pacific.

Another important assignment came in July 1956, when he was transferred to Washington, D.C., and appointed director of personnel at Headquarters Marine Corps under Commandant, General Randolph M. Pate. He served in this capacity until August 1958, when he was appointed commanding general of the Marine Corps Base Camp Lejeune, North Carolina.

Major General James P. Riseley was succeeded by Brigadier General Sidney S. Wade on June 30, 1959, and finally retired from the Marine Corps the next day after 41 years of service. He was advanced to the rank of lieutenant general on the retired list for having been specially commended in combat.

He was first married to Catharine Hohne and had 3 children (Claudette, Cynthia, and James P. jr.) and later divorced in 1937 and remarried in 1941.

He and his second wife, Marry Mossman, resided in Roswell, New Mexico, where he worked on his autobiography Uncle Jim, USMC: Recollections of Lt. Gen. James P. Riseley, United States Marine Corps (Ret.). Riseley died on March 2, 1992, and is buried at Santa Fe National Cemetery with his second wife, Mary Mossman Riseley. They had two daughters, Mary Burton and Margaret Cobourn.

== Decorations ==
Here is the ribbon bar of Lieutenant General James P. Riseley:

1st row	Legion of Merit with Combat "V"			
2nd row	Bronze Star Medal with Combat "V"	Navy Presidential Unit Citation with two stars	World War I Victory Medal	Marine Corps Expeditionary Medal with one star
3rd row	Second Nicaraguan Campaign Medal	American Defense Service Medal with Base Clasp	Asiatic-Pacific Campaign Medal with four 3/16 inch service stars	American Campaign Medal
4th row	World War II Victory Medal	Navy Occupation Service Medal	National Defense Service Medal	Haitian Médaille militaire with Diploma

Military offices
Preceded by Austin R. Brunelli	Commanding General of the Camp Lejeune; August 1958 - 1 July 1959	Succeeded by Sidney S. Wade
Preceded by Robert H. Pepper	Commanding General of the 3rd Marine Division; May 10, 1954 – June 30, 1955	Succeeded by Thomas A. Wornham
Preceded by Maurice G. Holmes	Commanding Officer of the 6th Marine Regiment; December 17, 1943 – September 3, 1944	Succeeded by Gregon A. Williams
