= George J. O'Shea =

American Marine Corps Major General

George Joseph O'Shea
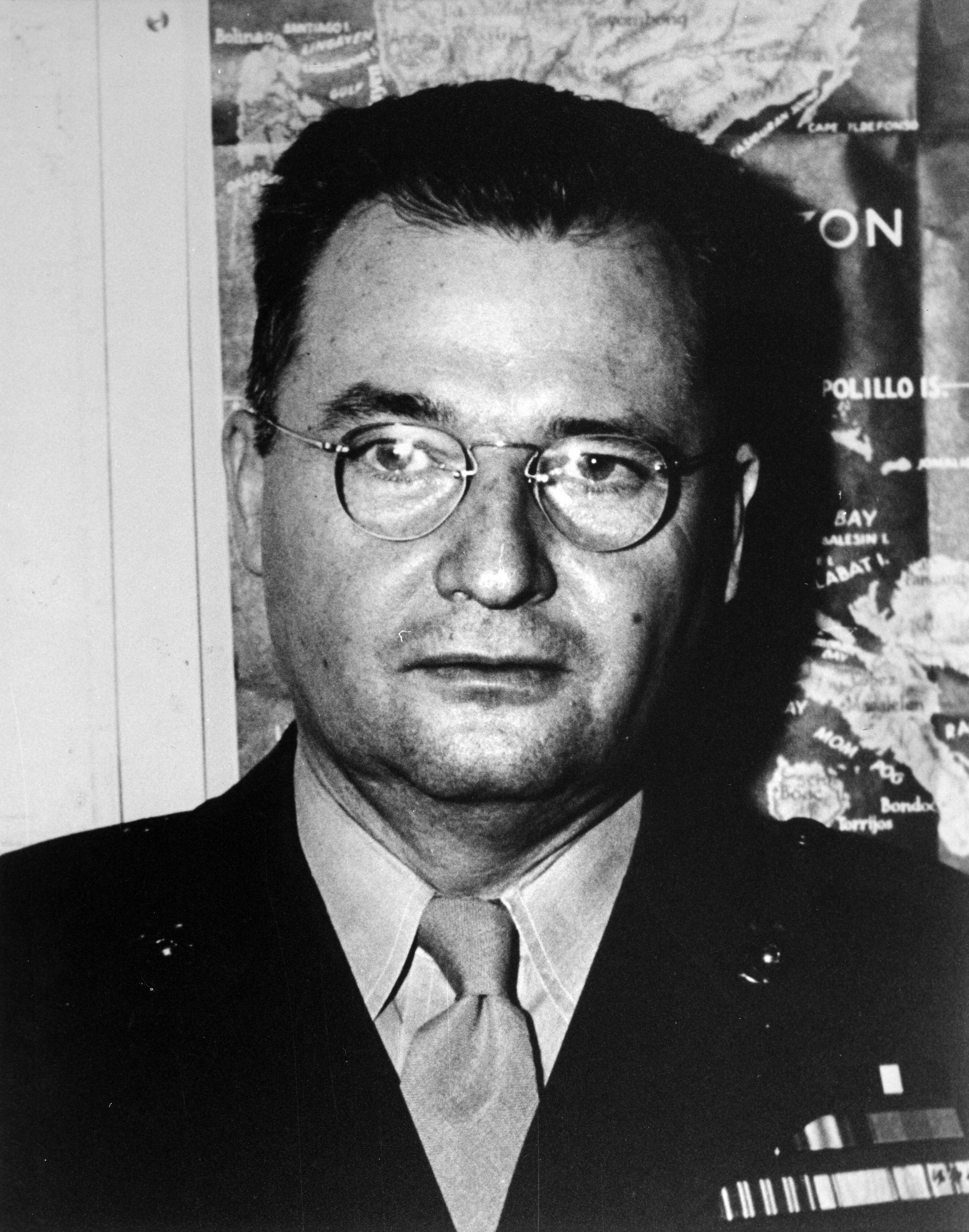
- BG George J. O'Shea, USMC
- Born: March 24, 1899; Brooklyn, New York, U.S.
- Died: August 17, 1983 (aged 84); Fort Lauderdale, Florida, U.S.
- Military career
- Allegiance: United States of America
- Branch: United States Marine Corps
- Service years: 1922–1952
- Rank: Brigadier general
- Service number: 0-3805
- Commands: 1st Marine Corps Reserve District
- Conflicts: Haitian Campaign; Nicaraguan Campaign: Battle of Sapotillal; World War II: New Guinea Campaign; Philippines Campaign
- Awards: Navy Cross; Navy Commendation Medal

George Joseph O'Shea (March 24, 1899 – August 17, 1983) was a highly decorated officer in the United States Marine Corps with the rank of brigadier general. He was decorated with the Navy Cross, the United States military's second-highest decoration awarded for valor in combat, during Battle of Sapotillal in October 1927. O'Shea served in the Pacific theater during World War II and retired in 1952 as director of the 1st Marine Corps Reserve District in Boston.

== Early career ==
O'Shea was born on March 24, 1899, in Brooklyn, New York, as the son of George and Marcella O'Shea. He attended the Brooklyn College Preparatory School and subsequently received appointment to the United States Naval Academy at Annapolis, Maryland, in June 1918. He graduated with Bachelor of Science degree in June 1922 and was commissioned second lieutenant in the Marine Corps at the same time. Many of his classmates became general officers later: Hyman G. Rickover, Robert E. Blick Jr., Herbert S. Duckworth, Clayton C. Jerome, James P. Riseley, James A. Stuart, Frank Peak Akers, Sherman Clark, Raymond P. Coffman, Delbert S. Cornwell, Frederick J. Eckhoff, Hugh H. Goodwin, John Higgins, Vernon Huber, Michael J. Malanaphy, William S. Parsons, Albert K. Morehouse, Harold F. Pullen, Harold R. Stevens, John P. Whitney, Lyman G. Miller and Ralph B. DeWitt.

O'Shea was then ordered to the Basic School at Marine Barracks Quantico for basic officer training, which he completed one year later. He was then ordered to the Marine barracks within Norfolk Navy Yard, Virginia, where he remained for brief period, before he was attached to the Second Brigade of Marines and ordered to Santo Domingo. When the brigade departed Santo Domingo in summer 1924, O'Shea was ordered to the Virgin Islands in July 1924 and joined the Marine barracks at local Naval Station, where he remained until January 1926, when he was ordered to the United States for duty with 5th Marine Regiment. He was stationed at Philadelphia Navy Yard until October 1926, when he was ordered to Boston for Mail Guard Duty during the Wave of robberies.

He returned to Quantico in January 1927 and sailed for expeditionary duty to Nicaragua two months later. O'Shea was promoted to first lieutenant shortly after his arrival and participated in the jungle patrols against hostile bandits under Augusto César Sandino. He distinguished himself on October 9, 1927, when he led a small patrol near Sapotillal in Nueva Segovia Department during the rescue mission of two downed Marine aviators. His unit was subsequently ambushed by vastly superior force of Sandinitas, but O'Shea and his Marines repulsed the enemy and successfully withdrew from the area. For his heroism in combat and skillful leadership, he was decorated with the Navy Cross, the United States military's second-highest decoration awarded for valor in combat and also received the Presidential Medal of Merit with Diploma from the Government of Nicaragua.

O'Shea returned to the United States in February 1928 and assumed duty at the Marine Barracks, New York Navy Yard, before he was ordered to the Marine detachment at the Rifle Range, Wakefield, Massachusetts. He remained in that capacity until October of that year, when he was sent to Haiti for duty as Assistant Chief of Police at Port-au-Prince while attached to the Garde d'Haïti. In this capacity, he participated in the training of Haitian Constabulary in combat operations against Cacos bandits and received Haitian Distinguished Service Medal.

In September 1930, O'Shea returned to the United States in order to enter the instruction at the Army Signal School at Fort Monmouth, New Jersey. He completed the course in June 1931 and assumed duty at Headquarters Marine Corps for brief period. O'Shea was sent to the Marine Corps Schools, Quantico soon thereafter and completed the Company Officers Course there. He then served as an instructor there, before he was appointed Commanications officer, 7th Marine Regiment.

O'Shea began his first tour of sea duty in March 1934, when he was appointed commanding officer of Marine detachment aboard the heavy cruiser USS Salt Lake City. He took part in the Fleet Review in New York City in May of that year, before he was transferred to command Marine detachment aboard the light cruiser USS Trenton in September 1934, when he was promoted to captain. He served aboard that vessel until August 1936 and participate in the visit of ports in the Caribbean, in Central America, and South America as the squadron conducted a good-will cruise to Latin America.

He then served as Communications Officer of 1st Marine Brigade under Brigadier General Richard P. Williams at Quantico, before he was sent as assistant naval attache to the American embassy in Mexico City in May 1938. O'Shea also studied the languages at the University of Mexico and graduated with Master of Arts degree in summer 1939. While in Mexico, he was promoted to the rank of major on May 2, 1939, and also received Mexican Medal of Naval Merit from President Manuel Ávila Camacho.

== World War II ==
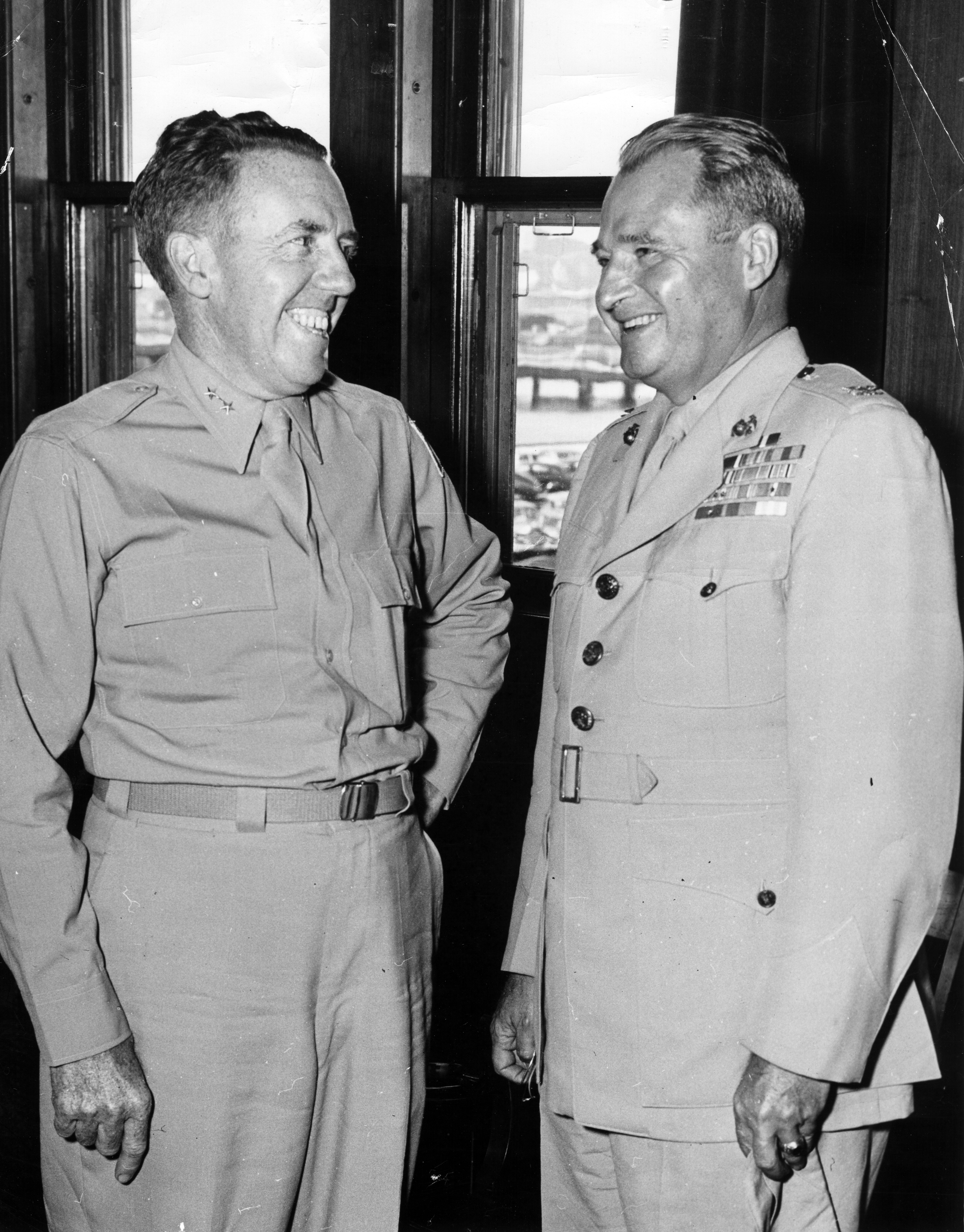
O'Shea being welcomed by Major General Frank A. Keating (left), Commanding general, New England Military District in September 1949.

O'Shea returned to the United States in January 1941 and assumed duty with the Office of Naval Intelligence, Navy Department in Washington, D.C., under Rear Admiral Theodore S. Wilkinson. He was promoted to lieutenant colonel in January 1942 and ordered to the Pacific area. O'Shea was attached to the staff of the commander, Amphibious Force, Southwest Pacific Area under Rear Admiral Daniel E. Barbey and served as operational planning officer and naval gunfire officer until the end of 1944.

While in this capacity, he served aboard the USS Blue Ridge and USS Henry T. Allen and participated in the New Guinea campaign and in combats in the Philippine Islands. For his service in this capacity, O'Shea received Navy Commendation Medal.

He returned to the United States in January 1945 and became an instructor at the Army-Navy Staff College in Washington, D.C., and remained in that capacity for the duration of the War.

== Later service ==
In May 1946, O'Shea was detached to the Office of the Chief of Naval Operations in connection with the declassification of naval combat records. He served in that assignment until June 1947, when he was sent to Guam, for duty as deputy chief of staff to the Commander Marianas under Rear Admiral George D. Murray and, following his promotion to colonel in August 1947, he was appointed assistant chief of staff for plans to the Commander Marianas.

He was ordered to the United States in June 1949 and appointed director of First Marine Corps Reserve District with headquarters in Boston, Massachusetts. While in this capacity, he had direction over a number of reserve units and recruitment stations and also was responsible for the inspection of reserve and recruitment units, and to make calls on governors and other public officials. O'Shea served in this capacity until his retirement in June 1952, when he was succeeded by Colonel Presley M. Rixey. Following his retirement after 30 years of commissioned service, O'Shea was advanced to the rank of brigadier general on the retired list for having been specially commended in combat.

O'Shea settled in Fort Lauderdale, Florida, together with his wife, Joan M. O'Shea. They had two sons, both marine officer, First Lieutenant George J. O'Shea and Second Lieutenant Robert J. O'Shea. They also have a daughter, Mary E. O'Shea. Brigadier General George J. O'Shea died on August 17, 1983, in Fort Lauderdale, Florida, and is buried in Our Lady, Queen of Heaven Cemetery, in Fort Lauderdale.

== Decorations ==
Here is the ribbon bar of Brigadier General O'Shea:

| 1st Row | Navy Cross | | Navy Commendation Medal |
| 2nd Row | World War I Victory Medal | Marine Corps Expeditionary Medal | Second Nicaraguan Campaign Medal |
| 3rd Row | American Defense Service Medal | American Campaign Medal | Asiatic-Pacific Campaign Medal with three 3/16 inch service stars |
| 4th Row | World War II Victory Medal | National Defense Service Medal | Philippine Liberation Medal with one star |
| 5th Row | Nicaraguan Presidential Medal of Merit with Diploma | Haitian Distinguished Service Medal | Mexican Medal of Naval Merit, 2nd Class |
