= Raymond P. Coffman =

US Marine Corps general

Raymond Paul Coffman
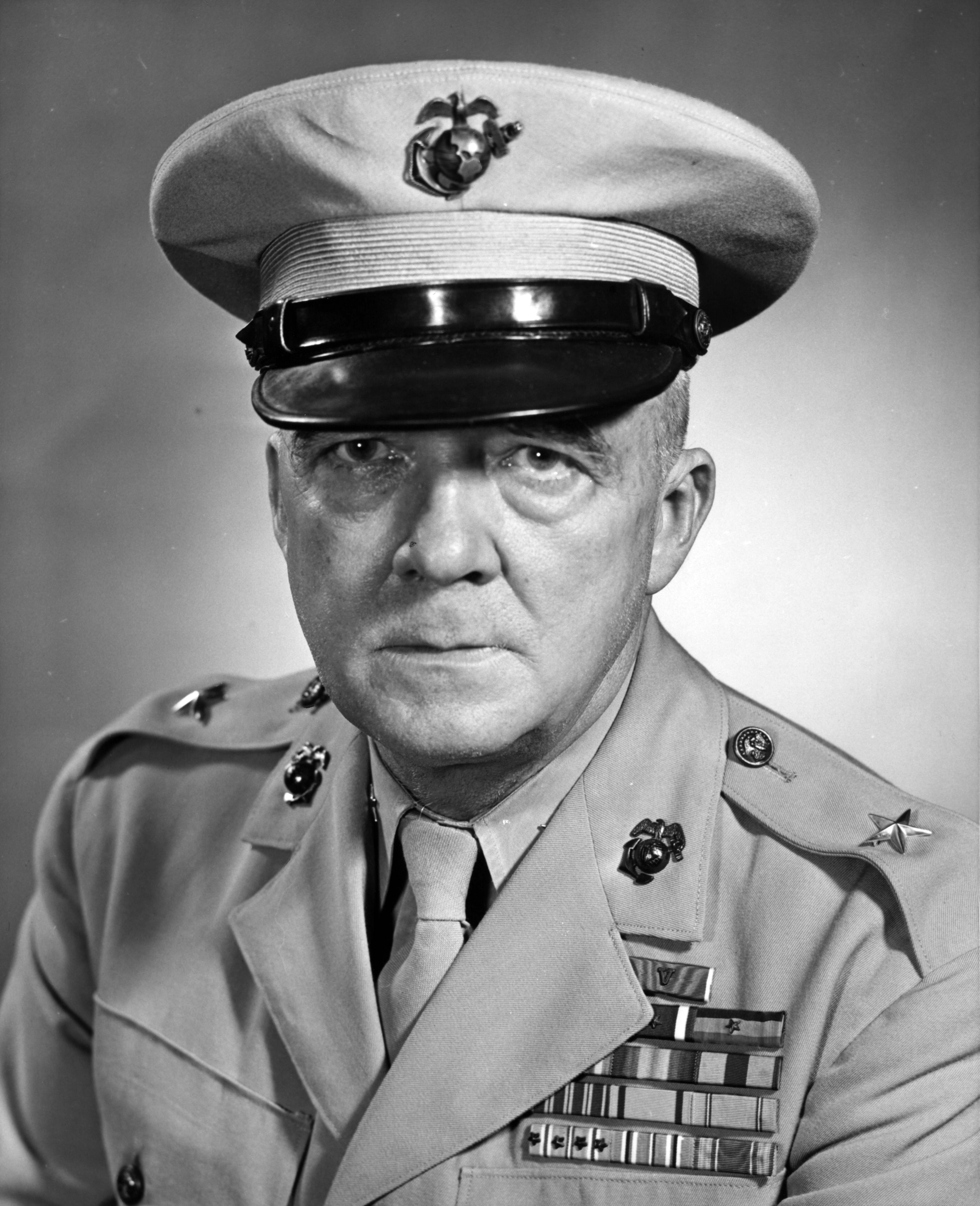
- Coffman as brigadier general, USMC
- Born: December 19, 1899; Phoenixville, Pennsylvania, US
- Died: December 17, 1973 (aged 73); Drexel Hill, Pennsylvania, US
- Burial place: Arlington National Cemetery
- Military career
- Allegiance: United States of America
- Branch: United States Marine Corps
- Service years: 1918–1955
- Rank: Major general
- Service number: 0-3789
- Commands: Depot of Supplies Albany; QM of 1st Marine Division
- Conflicts: World War I Haitian Campaign; Nicaraguan Campaign; World War II: Battle of Tulagi; Battle of Guadalcanal; New Guinea campaign; Battle of Cape Gloucester
- Awards: Legion of Merit; Navy Commendation Medal (2)

Raymond Paul Coffman (December 19, 1899 – December 17, 1973) was a decorated officer of the United States Marine Corps with the rank of major general. He is most noted as quartermaster of 1st Marine Division during Pacific War. Coffman later became the first commanding general of the Marine Corps Depot of Supplies Albany.

== Early life ==
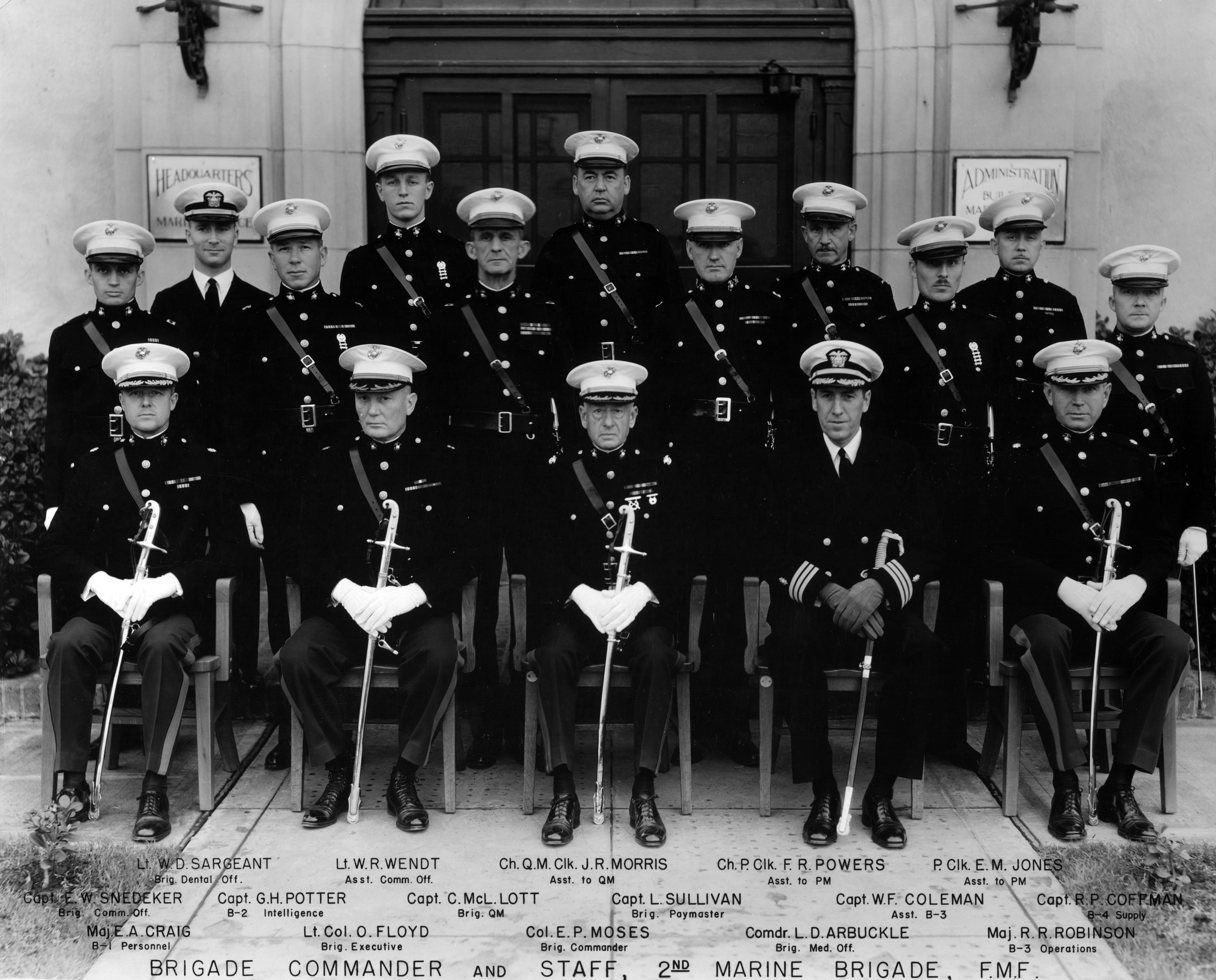
Captain Coffman (second row, first from right) with the staff of 2nd Marine Brigade in July 1936.

Raymond P. Coffman was born on December 19, 1899, in Phoenixville, Pennsylvania. He attended the United States Naval Academy at Annapolis, Maryland, and graduated in June 1922 with the rank of second lieutenant in the Marine Corps. Many of his classmates became general officers later: Hyman G. Rickover, Robert E. Blick Jr., Herbert S. Duckworth, Clayton C. Jerome, James P. Riseley, James A. Stuart, Frank Peak Akers, Sherman Clark, Ralph B. DeWitt, Delbert S. Cornwell, Frederick J. Eckhoff, Hugh H. Goodwin, John Higgins, Vernon Huber, Michael J. Malanaphy, William S. Parsons, Albert K. Morehouse, Harold F. Pullen, Harold R. Stevens, John P. Whitney, Lyman G. Miller and George J. O'Shea.

As any other fresh officer, he was sent to the Basic School at Marine Barracks Quantico for further officers training. Upon completion of the course, Coffman was assigned to the 1st Marine Brigade and sent to Haiti in March 1924.

He returned to the United States in May 1926 and was assigned for mail guard duty at Brooklyn Navy Yard during a wave of armed robberies. Coffman was subsequently ordered for another expeditionary duty, when he was assigned to the 5th Marine Regiment and sent to Nicaragua to fight the rebels. He arrived there in March 1927 and was appointed commanding officer of the Guardia Nacional detachment in Darío region.

Upon his return to his country in September 1929, Coffman briefly served at Marine Barracks Parris Island, before he was appointed commander of the Marine detachment aboard the cruiser USS Northampton in May 1930. While aboard that ship, he participated in the patrol sea duty in the Pacific Ocean until July 1932, when he was appointed supply officer on the staff of 2nd Marine Brigade under Colonel Emile P. Moses. While in this capacity, he participated in the Caribbean maneuvers.

In July 1937, Coffman was transferred to the Marine Barracks at Cavite, Philippine Islands, where he was appointed executive officer of the Naval prison. He was later transferred to the 4th Marine Regiment (China Marines) under Colonel Charles F. B. Price, which was stationed in Shanghai, China to protect American citizens and property in the Shanghai International Settlement during the Second Sino-Japanese War. Coffman returned to Cavite in November 1937 and served as post quartermaster until he was ordered back to the United States in August 1939.

== World War II ==
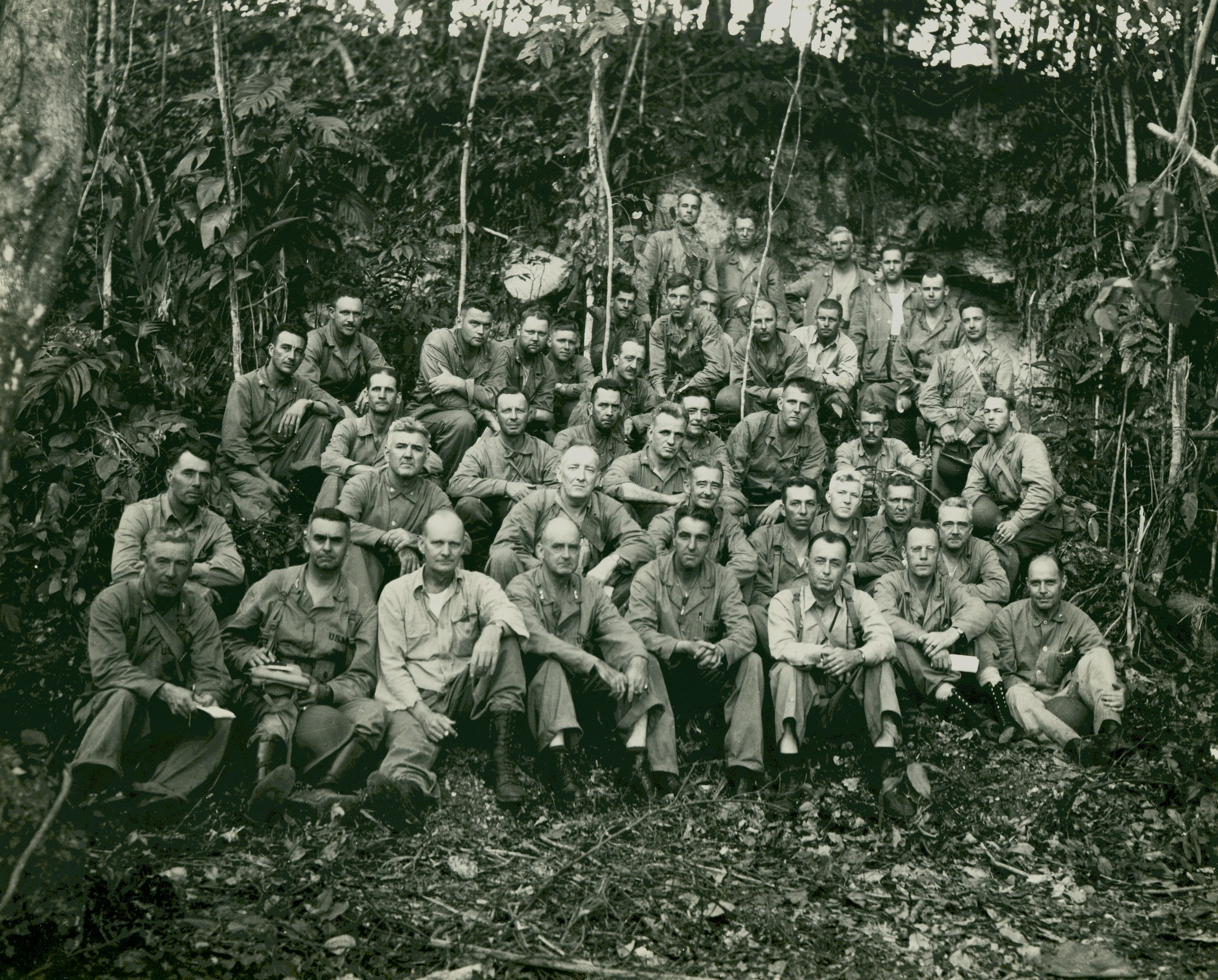
Coffman (sitting in the second row, first from right) with the staff of 1st Marine Division on Guadalcanal in late 1942.

At the outbreak of the World War II in September 1939, Coffman was appointed quartermaster of the Depot of Supplies at Naval Station Norfolk. He subsequently spent some time as quartermaster of the Marine Barracks Quantico and later also at Camp Lejeune, before he was appointed Supply officer of 1st Marine Division at Quantico under Major General Philip H. Torrey in January 1942. The 1st Division went overseas during the summer 1942 and subsequently participated with the part of the division in the Landing at Tulagi.

He rejoined the rest of the division on 21 October 1942 and participated in the capture and defense of Guadalcanal. Following the heavy combats, 1st Division was withdrawn to Australia in December 1942 for rest and refit. Coffman was responsible for the supplying of the Marine units during the combats at Guadalcanal and was decorated with the Legion of Merit with Combat "V" for his service in this capacity.

Following the nine months of refitting and training in Australia, Coffman went with his division to Eastern New Guinea to support Sixth Army operations. During the December 1943, Coffman participated in the Battle of Cape Gloucester, where he distinguished himself again and was decorated with Navy Commendation Medal with Combat "V". He remained with the 1st Division until July 1944, when he was relieved by Lieutenant Colonel Harvey C. Tschirgi and returned to the United States.

Coffman was appointed Assistant Quartermaster of the Depot of Supplies San Francisco under Brigadier General Arnold W. Jacobsen. In this capacity, he was responsible for the Bulk of Equipment and supplies for all Marine forces in the Pacific. Coffman remained in this assignment for the rest of the War and received his second Navy Commendation Medal for his service there.

== Later career ==
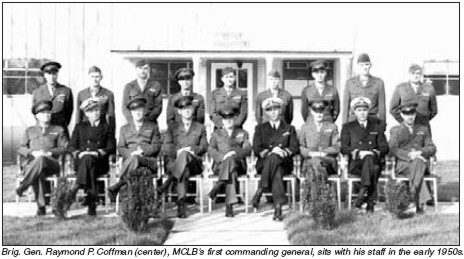
Brig. Gen. Coffman (center) and his staff at Depot of Supplies Albany opening ceremony, 1952.

Colonel Coffman stayed in San Francisco until June 1949, when he has been transferred to Washington, D.C., and assigned to the Headquarters Marine Corps for a brief period. In August of that year, he entered the studies at Industrial College of the Armed Forces and graduated in July 1951. Following his graduation, he was promoted to the rank of brigadier general and remained at Headquarters Marine Corps as Chief of Supply Branch and executive officer of the Supply Department.

Last assignment of his career came in January 1952, when he was appointed commanding general of the newly commissioned Marine Corps Depot of Supplies Albany, Georgia. Coffman retired from this capacity on July 1, 1955, and was advanced to the rank of major general on the retired list for having been specially commended in combat.

Major General Raymond P. Coffman died on December 17, 1973, only two days before his 74th birthday. He is buried at Arlington National Cemetery together with his wife Ruth Lumley Coffman (1900–1990). They had together one daughter, Ruth Coffman Barnes and son Raymond P. Coffman Jr., who also served with the Marines as an officer.

== Decorations ==
Here is the ribbon bar of Major General Raymond P. Coffman:

1st Row	Legion of Merit with Combat "V"			
2nd Row	Navy Commendation Medal with Combat "V" and one star	Navy Presidential Unit Citation with one star	Navy Unit Commendation	World War I Victory Medal
3rd Row	Marine Corps Expeditionary Medal	Second Nicaraguan Campaign Medal	China Service Medal	American Defense Service Medal
4th Row	Asiatic-Pacific Campaign Medal with four 3/16 inch service stars	American Campaign Medal	World War II Victory Medal	National Defense Service Medal
