= Clayton C. Jerome =

Marine Lieutenant general

Clayton Charles Jerome
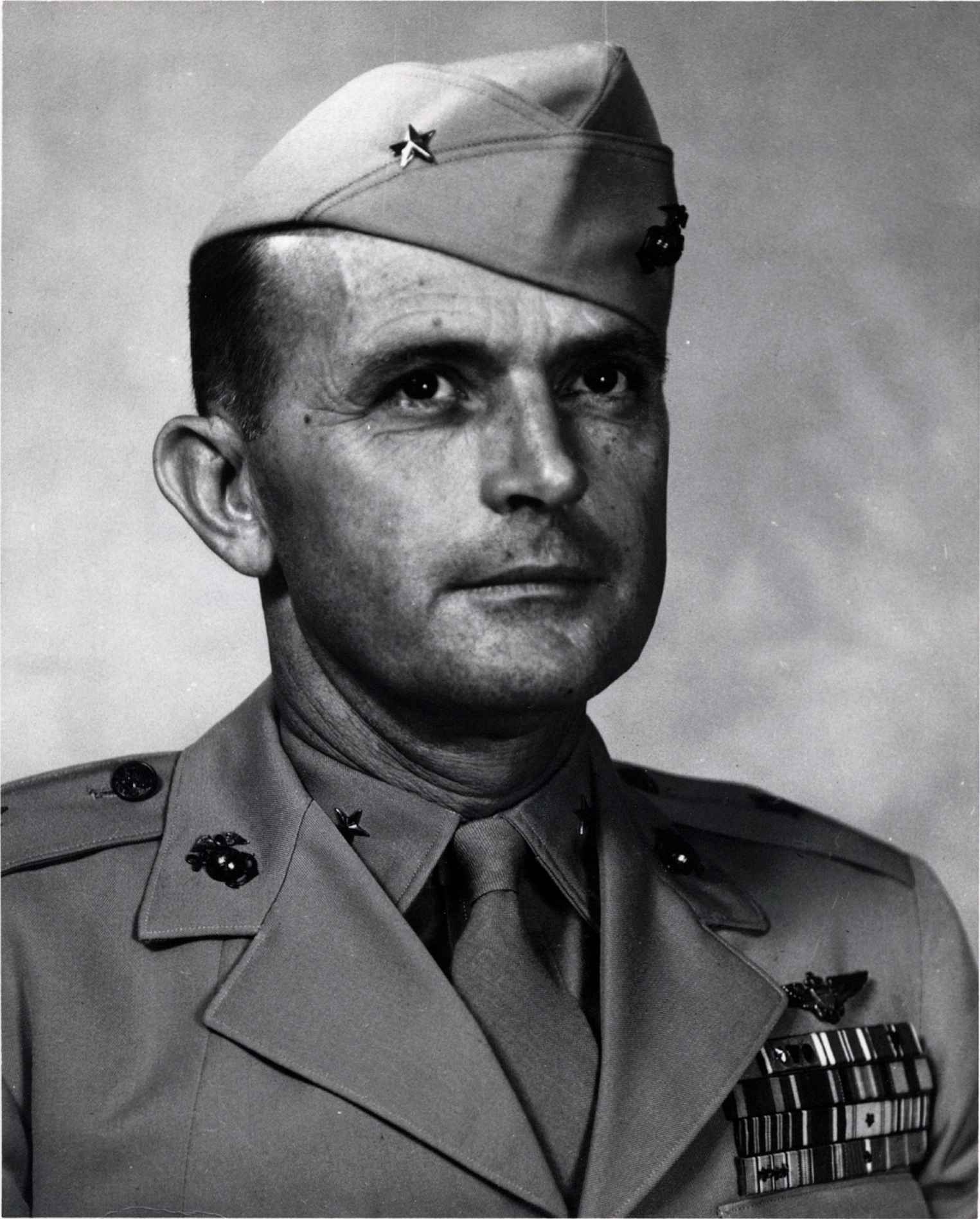
- Jerome as Brigadier general, USMC
- Born: September 22, 1901; Hutchinson, Kansas, US
- Died: February 13, 1978 (aged 76); Arlington, Virginia, US
- Burial place: Arlington National Cemetery
- Relatives: Sarah Hunter "Sally" Jerome (author)
- Military career
- Allegiance: United States
- Branch: United States Marine Corps
- Service years: 1922–1959
- Rank: Lieutenant general
- Service number: 0-3799
- Commands: Director of Aviation; 1st Marine Air Wing; 2nd Marine Air Wing
- Conflicts: Nicaraguan Campaign; Yangtze Patrol; World War II: Solomon Islands campaign; Bougainville campaign; Philippines campaign; Korean War
- Awards: Distinguished Service Medal; Legion of Merit (4); Distinguished Flying Cross; Bronze Star Medal; Air Medal

Clayton Charles Jerome CBE (September 22, 1901 – February 13, 1978) was an aviator who served in the United States Marine Corps from to 1922 to 1952. He distinguished himself in combat during World War II and the Korean War, earning the Distinguished Service Medal and four awards of the Legion of Merit with Combat 'V' — for his valor during World War II, he received two Legion of Merit awards from the Marine Corps and one from the army. He received his fourth Legion of Merit and the Distinguished Service Medal from the air force for his actions during the Korean War.

== Early years & education ==
Clayton Charles Jerome was born on September 22, 1901, in Hutchinson, Kansas. After spending time at the Marion Military Institute, he entered the U.S. Naval Academy during World War I. He graduated in 1922. While serving in the Marine Corps, he began graduate studies at Naval Academy in 1932, and then at California Institute of Technology where he earned a Master of Science degree in Aeronautical Engineering.

Many of his classmates from the Naval Academy became general officers later: Hyman G. Rickover, Robert E. Blick Jr., Herbert S. Duckworth, James P. Riseley, James A. Stuart, Frank Peak Akers, Sherman Clark, Raymond P. Coffman, Ralph B. DeWitt, Delbert S. Cornwell, Frederick J. Eckhoff, Hugh H. Goodwin, John Higgins, Vernon Huber, Michael J. Malanaphy, William S. Parsons, Albert K. Morehouse, Harold F. Pullen, Harold R. Stevens, John P. Whitney, Lyman G. Miller and George J. O'Shea.

== Marine Corps service ==
=== 1920s & 1930s ===
Jerome was commissioned a Marine second lieutenant upon graduation from the Naval Academy. After completing the Basic School at Quantico, Virginia, and serving a year at the Marine Barracks, Washington, D.C., he entered flight training at Pensacola, Florida in August 1924. Following his designation as aviator, Jerome served at the Naval Air Station, Marine Corps Base, San Diego, beginning in July 1925. In September 1924, Division 1, Fighting Plane Squadron 3M (VF-3M), 2nd Aviation Group was activated Naval Air Station San Diego. 2nd Lt Jerome service as the squadron's first commanding officer for 19 days before giving over command to a 1st lieutenant.

In April 1927, he was appointed a first lieutenant and ordered to China via the Philippine Islands. Completing his expeditionary service in China, he was stationed briefly on Guam in September 1928, before returning to San Diego.

In January 1930, when the hand control or "stick" of his plane broke off at the socket while he was practicing acrobatics 2,000 feet over the city of San Diego, California. Since a crash would have resulted in death or property damage for people on the ground, he elected to stay with the plane rather than parachute. He righted the craft to normal flying position by maneuvering the socket with his hand; then, lashing the stick back to the socket with his handkerchief, trouser belt and necktie, he made a successful landing. For this action, he received a letter of commendation from the Chief of the Bureau of Aeronautics, Navy Department.

From the West Coast, Jerome was again ordered to Quantico, where he served with Aircraft Squadrons, East Coast Expeditionary Force. He then completed a tour of temporary duty in Nicaragua before entering the Post Graduate School at the Naval Academy in June 1932. He went on from there to the California Institute of Technology at Pasadena, where he obtained his Master of Science degree in Aeronautical Engineering.

Advanced to captain in May 1934, Jerome reported to the Bureau of Aeronautics, Navy Department, before he was detailed to the American Legation in Bogota, Colombia as Naval Attaché and Naval Attaché for Air at the American Legation in Bogota, Columbio to the governments of Colombia, Panama, Venezuela, Costa Rica, Nicaragua, Honduras, El Salvador and Guatemala. While serving in the latter capacity, he earned the Distinguished Flying Cross in April 1937, for his daring rescue of the survivors of a Venezuelan plane crash. Using an amphibious plane, he repeatedly flew over the treacherous jungles of Cuyuni in search of the wreck. After finding it, he made two hazardous landings on the narrow Cuyuni River to rescue four survivors.

On his return to the United States, Jerome entered the Air Corps Tactical School at Maxwell Field, Montgomery, Alabama, where he was promoted to major. He completed the school in May 1939, and served again at the Naval Air Station, San Diego, until May 1940, when he was ordered to Washington once more for duty in the Bureau of Aeronautics. He later served as officer in charge of the Reserve Personnel Section and as assistant director of the Division of Aviation at Marine Corps Headquarters, where he received his promotions to lieutenant colonel and colonel. From 30 March 1943 to 12 May 1943, Col. Jerome served as acting director of aviation.

=== World War II ===
In World War II, Jerome participated in the consolidation of the Northern Solomons, the Treasury-Bougainville operation, the Bismarck Archipelago campaign and the Luzon and Mindanao fighting in the Philippines. He earned his first Legion of Merit with Combat "V" as operations officer on the staff of the commander, Aircraft, Northern Solomons, from November 1943, to March 1944, during air operations against the Japanese in the Bougainvile-Rabaul-New Ireland area.

His second Legion of Merit was for meritorious service from June to December 1944, as chief of staff to the commander, Air, Northern Solomons, and as commander, aircraft, and island commander, Emirau. His third, awarded by the army, was for service on Luzon in January and February 1945, while commanding Mangalden airstrip and Marine Air Groups at Dagupan. During that period, he directed Marine air support on all the Luzon battlefronts. He also received the Bronze Star Medal (Army) and the Air Medal in World War II.

After participating in five campaigns, Jerome returned to the United States in July 1945, to take command of the Marine Corps Air Station in Quantico. He was named Chief of Staff of the Marine Corps Schools there in June 1948, and in April 1949, was promoted to brigadier general. In July 1949, he was ordered again to Marine Corps Headquarters, where he served simultaneously as director of public information, director of recruiting, and director of Marine Corps history.

=== 1950s / Korean War ===
In September 1950, Jerome became the Director of Aviation at Headquarters Marine Corps. From April 1952 to December 1952, he took command of the 1st Marine Aircraft Wing in Korea, receiving the Distinguished Service Medal and his fourth Legion of Merit for his leadership in that capacity. The awards were presented to him by the U.S. Air Force. In July 1952, he was promoted to major general.

In January 1953, he reported to Cherry Point, North Carolina, to serve both as commanding general of the 2nd Marine Aircraft Wing and commanding general, Aircraft, Fleet Marine Force, Atlantic. When those commands were separated in October 1953, he moved Norfolk, Virginia, to serve in the latter capacity. He remained at Norfolk until July 1955, and assumed his final duties 1 August 1955 as commanding general, Aircraft, Fleet Marine Force, Pacific. He retired in 1959 and was promoted to the rank of lieutenant general.

=== Dates of rank ===
| Insignia | Rank | Dates |
|---|---|---|
| | Second lieutenant | 1922–April 1927 |
| | First lieutenant | April 1927 – May 1934 |
| | Captain | May 1934 – c. 1939 |
| | Major | c. 1939 – |
| | Lieutenant colonel | |
| | Colonel | |
| | Brigadier general | April 1949 – July 1952 |
| | Major general | July 1952 – 1959 |
| | Lieutenant general | 1959 |

=== Military awards ===
Jerome held many decorations for distinguished service and service medals including:

Naval Aviator Badge
| 1st Row | Army Distinguished Service Medal | Legion of Merit with three 5/16" Gold Stars and Combat "V" | Distinguished Flying Cross | Bronze Star Medal with Combat "V" |
| 2nd Row | Air Medal | Navy Unit Commendation with one star | World War I Victory Medal | Marine Corps Expeditionary Medal |
| 3rd Row | Second Nicaraguan Campaign Medal | Yangtze Service Medal | American Defense Service Medal with Fleet Clasp | American Campaign Medal |
| 4th Row | Asiatic-Pacific Campaign Medal with four 3/16 inch silver service stars | World War II Victory Medal | Korean Service Medal with two 3/16 inch silver service stars | National Defense Service Medal |
| 5th Row | Philippine Liberation Medal with one star | Commander of the Order of the British Empire (New Zealand award) | Grand Official of the Order of Merit (Chile) | United Nations Korea Medal |

Military offices
| Preceded by William J. Wallace (USMC) | Director of Aviation; September 1, 1950 - April 1, 1952 | Succeeded by William O. Brice |

== Personal life ==
Jerome was married to Sarah Hunter "Sally" Jerome. Sally authored the book The Marine Corps Wife, which was "a guide to approved customs of military social life". Her sons are retired Marine Corps Colonel J. Hunter Reinburg, author of Aerial Combat Escapades: A Pilot's Logbook: The True Combat Aerial Adventures of an American Fighter Pilot.; and, retired Air Force Colonel George Reinburg.

Jerome died of cancer on February 13, 1978, at age 77, at Veterans Administration Hospital in Arlington Virginia. He was survived by his wife and two stepsons. He is buried in Arlington National Cemetery.

His widow Sally died in 1992.
