= USS Gambier Bay =

Casablanca-class escort carrier of the US Navy

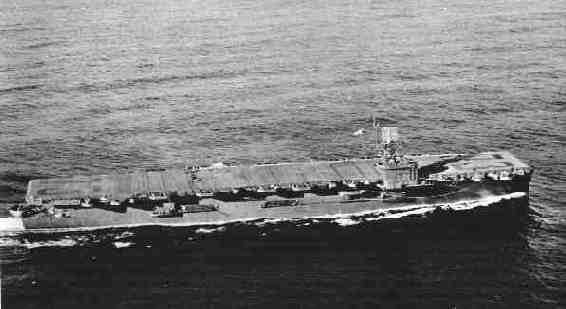
- USS Gambier Bay

History

United States
- Name: Gambier Bay
- Namesake: Gambier Bay on Admiralty Island, east of Angoon, Alaska
- Builder: Kaiser Company, Vancouver
- Laid down: 10 July 1943
- Launched: 22 November 1943
- Sponsored by: Mrs. H. C. Zitzewitz
- Commissioned: 28 December 1943
- Out of service: 25 October 1944
- Stricken: 27 November 1944
- Honors and awards: Four battle stars, Presidential Unit Citation awarded to all ships of "Taffy 3"
- Fate: Sunk by Japanese battleship Yamato on 25 October 1944 in the Battle off Samar

General characteristics
- Class & type: Casablanca-class escort carrier
- Displacement: 8,188 long tons (8,319 t) (standard); 10,902 long tons (11,077 t) (full load)
- Length: 512 ft 3 in (156.13 m) (o/a)
- Beam: 65 ft 2 in (19.86 m), 108 ft (33 m) maximum width
- Draft: 22 ft 6 in (6.86 m)
- Installed power: 9,000 ihp (6,700 kW)
- Propulsion: 2 × 5-cylinder Skinner Uniflow reciprocating steam engines; 4 × 285 psi boilers; 2 × screws
- Speed: 19 kn (22 mph; 35 km/h)
- Range: 10,240 nmi (11,780 mi; 18,960 km) at 15 kn (17 mph; 28 km/h)
- Complement: 860
- Armament: 1 × 5 in (127 mm)/38 cal dual purpose gun; 16 × 40 mm (1.57 in) Bofors anti-aircraft guns (8×2); 20 × 20 mm (0.79 in) Oerlikon anti-aircraft cannons (20×1)
- Aircraft carried: 28
- Aviation facilities: 2 × elevators; 1 × catapult

Service record
- Part of: United States Pacific Fleet
- Commanders: Captain Hugh H. Goodwin, Captain Walter V. R. Vieweg
- Operations: Mariana and Palau Islands campaign, Philippines campaign, Battle off Samar
- Awards: Presidential Unit Citation; 4 Battle stars

USS Gambier Bay (CVE-73) was a Casablanca-class escort carrier of the United States Navy. During the Battle off Samar, part of the overall Battle of Leyte Gulf, during a successful effort to turn back a much larger attacking Japanese surface force, Gambier Bay was sunk by naval gunfire, primarily from the battleship Yamato, taking at least 15 hits between 8:10 and 8:50. She was the only American aircraft carrier sunk by enemy surface gunfire during World War II.

Named for Gambier Bay on Admiralty Island in the Alaska Panhandle, she was originally classified AVG-73, was reclassified ACV-73 on 20 August 1942 and again reclassified CVE-73 on 15 July 1943; launched under a Maritime Commission contract by the Kaiser Company, Vancouver, Washington on 22 November 1943; sponsored by Mrs. H. C. Zitzewitz, wife of Lieutenant Commander Herbert C. Zitzewitz, the Senior Naval Liaison Officer (SNLO) assigned to Kaiser's Vancouver Yard from the Navy's Bureau of Ships; and commissioned at Astoria, Oregon on 28 December 1943, Captain Hugh H. Goodwin in command.

The ship was referred to as the "Bonus Ship" by yard personnel because she was the 19th carrier delivered in 1943. The yard had originally projected 16 carriers would be delivered before the end of 1943. However, in September the Navy asked the yard to increase that number by at least two more. To rally the workers, Kaiser initiated a campaign called "18 or More by '44" to meet the new challenge; being the 19th and last Kaiser-built carrier commissioned in 1943, Gambier Bay was dubbed the "Bonus Ship". No ships of her class survive today.

== Design and description ==
A side profile of the design of Thetis Bay.

Gambier Bay was a Casablanca-class escort carrier, the most numerous type of aircraft carriers ever built. Built to stem heavy losses during the Battle of the Atlantic, they came into service in late 1943, by which time the U-boat threat was already in retreat. Although some did see service in the Atlantic, the majority were utilized in the Pacific, ferrying aircraft, providing logistics support, and conducting close air support for the island-hopping campaigns. The Casablanca-class carriers were built on the standardized Type S4-S2-BB3 hull, a lengthened variant of the Doyen-class hull, and specifically designed to be mass-produced using welded prefabricated sections. This allowed them to be produced at unprecedented speeds: the final ship of her class, Munda, was delivered to the Navy just 101 days after the laying of her keel.

Gambier Bay was 512 ft 3 in (156.13 m) long overall (490 ft (150 m) at the waterline), had a beam of 65 ft 2 in (19.86 m), and a draft of 20 ft 9 in (6.32 m). She displaced 8,188 long tons (8,319 t) standard, which increased to 10,902 long tons (11,077 t) with a full load. To carry out flight operations, the ship had a 257 ft (78 m) hangar deck and a 474 ft (144 m) flight deck. Her compact size necessitated the installation of an aircraft catapult at her bow, and there were two aircraft elevators to facilitate movement of aircraft between the flight and hangar deck: one each fore and aft.

She was powered by four Babcock & Wilcox Express D boilers that raised 285 psi (1,970 kPa) of steam at 577 °F (303 °C). The steam generated by these boilers fed two Skinner Unaflow reciprocating steam engines, delivering 9,000 hp (6,700 kW) to two propeller shafts. This allowed her to reach speeds of 19 kn (35 km/h; 22 mph), with a cruising range of 10,240 nmi (18,960 km; 11,780 mi) at 15 kn (28 km/h; 17 mph). For armament, one 5 in (127 mm)/38 caliber dual-purpose gun was mounted on the stern. Additional anti-aircraft defense was provided by eight Bofors 40 mm (1.57 in) anti-aircraft guns in single mounts and twelve Oerlikon 20 mm (0.79 in) cannons mounted around the perimeter of the deck. Sensors onboard consisted of a SG surface-search radar and a SK air-search radar.

Although Casablanca-class escort carriers were intended to function with a crew of 860 and an embarked squadron of 50 to 56, the exigencies of wartime often necessitated the inflation of the crew count. They were designed to operate with 27 aircraft, but the hangar deck could accommodate much more during transport or training missions.

== Service history ==
=== World War II ===
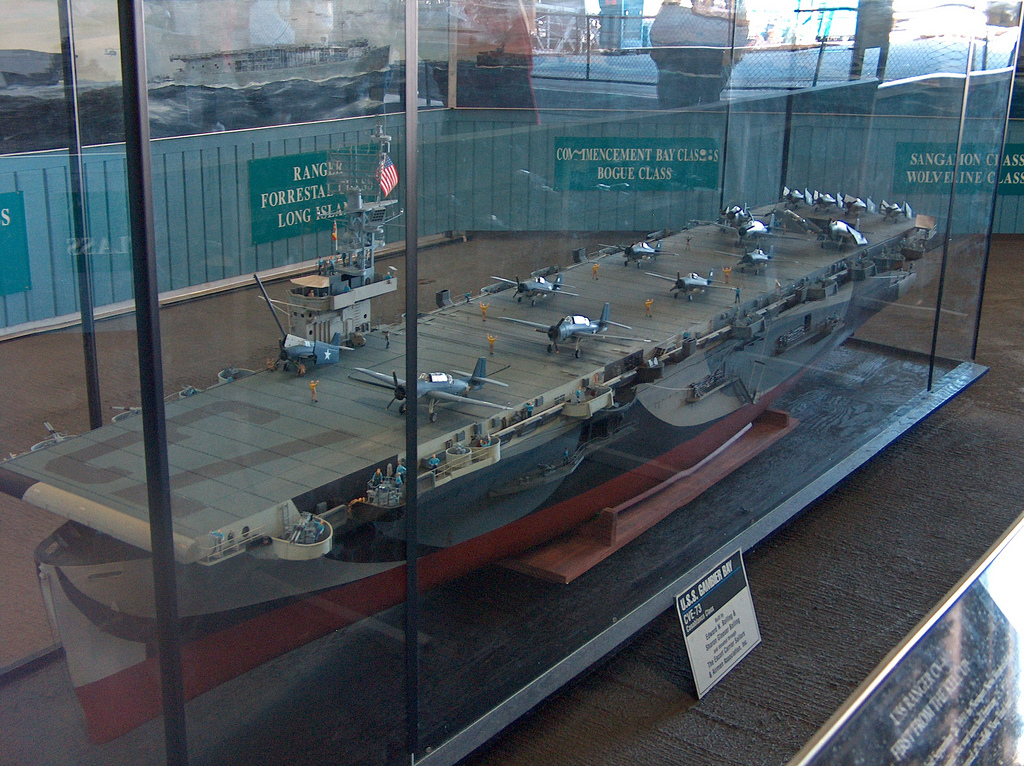
Model of Gambier Bay at USS Midway museum

After shakedown out of San Diego, the escort carrier sailed on 7 February 1944 with 400 troops embarked for Pearl Harbor, thence to rendezvous off the Marshalls, guarded by the destroyer Norman Scott, where she flew 84 replacement planes to the fleet carrier Enterprise. She returned to San Diego via Pearl Harbor, ferrying aircraft for repairs and qualified carrier pilots off the coast of Southern California. She departed on 1 May 1944 to join Rear Admiral Harold B. Sallada's Carrier Support Group 2 (TG 52.11), staging in the Marshalls for the invasion of the Marianas.

Gambier Bay gave close air support to the initial landings of Marines on Saipan 15 June 1944, destroying enemy gun emplacements, troops, tanks, and trucks. On the 17th, her combat air patrol (CAP) shot down or turned back all but a handful of 47 enemy planes headed for her task group and her gunners shot down two of the three planes that did break through to attack her.

The following day, warning of another air attack sounded. As her fighters prepared to take off, they found intense antiaircraft fire of the entire task group covering their flight path. Captain Goodwin called the event "another shining example of the adaptability and courage of the young men of our country". Eight pilots of Composite Squadron 10 (VC-10) did take off to help repulse the aerial attack.

Gambier Bay remained off Saipan, repulsing aerial raids and launching planes which strafed enemy troop concentrations, bombed gun emplacements, and supported Marines and soldiers fighting ashore. Meanwhile, American carriers slashed the carrier air strength of the combined Japanese Mobile Fleet and turned it back in defeat in the Battle of the Philippine Sea. Gambier Bay continued close ground support operations at Tinian (19–31 July), then turned her attention to Guam, where she gave identical aid to invading troops until 11 August.

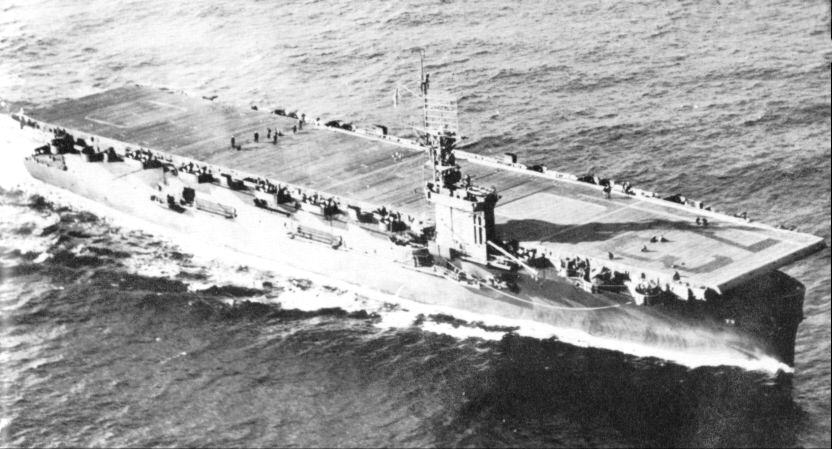
Gambier Bay underway

After a respite for logistics in the Marshalls, Gambier Bay spent 15–28 September supporting the amphibious attack which drove ashore and captured Peleliu and Angaur, Southern Palaus. She then steamed by way of Hollandia (currently known as Jayapura), New Guinea, to Manus Island, Admiralties, where the invasion of the Philippines was staged. Screened by four destroyer escorts, Gambier Bay and her sister ship Kitkun Bay escorted transports and amphibious landing ships safely to Leyte Gulf before joining Rear Admiral Clifton A. F. Sprague's escort carrier task unit on 19 September off Leyte.

The task unit comprised six escort carriers, screened by three destroyers and four destroyer escorts, and was known by its radio call sign: "Taffy 3". Under the command of Rear Admiral Thomas L. Sprague, three groups of six-carrier task units, known as "Taffy"s, maintained air supremacy over Leyte Gulf and eastern Leyte. During the invasion their planes destroyed enemy airfields, supply convoys, and troop concentrations; gave troops driving inland vital close air support; and maintained combat air patrol over ships in Leyte Gulf. While "Taffy 1" and "Taffy 2" were respectively stationed off northern Mindanao and off the entrance to Leyte Gulf, "Taffy 3" steamed off Samar.

Meanwhile, the Japanese threw their entire fleet against American naval power in a desperate gamble to destroy the large concentration of American shipping in Leyte Gulf. Powerful Japanese forces—composed of carriers, battleships, cruisers, and destroyers—attempted to converge on the Philippines in a three-pronged attack to the south, center, and north. The Japanese Southern Force met disaster before dawn on 25 October as it tried to drive through Surigao Strait to join the Center Force off Leyte Gulf. While steaming through the Sibuyan Sea en route to the San Bernardino Strait on 24 October, the Center Force was hit hard by hundreds of planes from the carriers of Admiral William "Bull" Halsey's Third Fleet. After the Battle of Sibuyan Sea, Admiral Halsey no longer considered the Center Force a serious threat, and he sent the carriers north to intercept decoy carriers of the Japanese Northern Force off Cape Engaño.

=== Battle off Samar ===
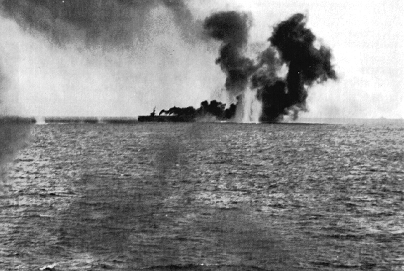
Gambier Bay under Japanese fire during the Battle off Samar. The smudge in the upper right corner is a Japanese heavy cruiser

The departure of Halsey's carriers left the escort carriers of "Taffy 3" as the only ships guarding the area around Samar. American commanders were unaware of night-time movement of the Japanese Center Force toward Samar. However, shortly after sunrise on 25 October, a gap in the morning mist disclosed the pagoda-like masts of enemy battleships and cruisers on the northern horizon. Admiral Takeo Kurita's still dangerous Center Force—consisting of four battleships, six heavy cruisers, two light cruisers and 11 destroyers—had slipped undetected through San Bernardino Strait and down the fog-shrouded coast of Samar, bound for Leyte Gulf. Visibility was approximately 40,000 yards (37 km) with a low overcast and occasional rain squalls which the American ships would use to their advantage in the coming battle.

"Taffy 3" was overwhelmingly outgunned by the Center Force. Immediately, an urgent call for help went out from "Taffy 3" as the escort carriers steamed eastward to launch planes before gradually turning south to seek concealment in a heavy squall. American pilots attacked the Japanese formation with torpedoes, bombs, and strafing runs until their ammunition ran out, after which they made "dry runs"—dummy attacks with no ordnance or ammunition—to break up the enemy formation and delay its advance. Smoke was laid down to cover the escort carriers' escape as the destroyers ducked in and out of the smoke and rain to engage the Japanese warships at point-blank range until ordered back to cover the escort carriers with more smoke.

==== Coming under heavy fire ====
In spite of these efforts, Gambier Bay would come under fire from multiple ships at around 8:10. The heavy cruiser Chikuma closed to 10,200 yards and fired off her eight 8-inch (203 mm) guns, but a few minutes later switched fire to the destroyer escort USS Samuel B Roberts. Meanwhile at 22,000 yards, the Japanese flagship, the battleship Yamato, landed a hit on her first salvo as an 18.1-inch (46 cm) shell smashed through Gambier Bay's flight deck near her stern, starting a fire on the flight deck which was put out in three minutes. At 8:16, another shell from Yamato cut through her hangar bay. Haruna also fired a single salvo at Gambier Bay before switching fire to escorting destroyers.

==== The fatal hit ====
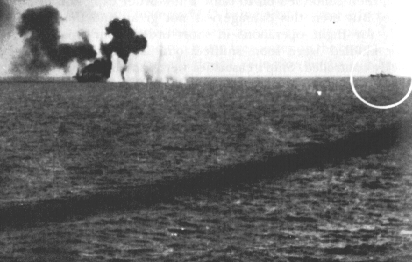
Gambier Bay on fire as shells from Yamato blast massive water columns beside her. One of the Japanese cruisers firing on Kalinin Bay is circled.

Around 08:20, Gambier Bay was crippled by a shell hit which flooded her forward engine room, immediately cutting her speed to 10 knots as she gradually slowed until dead in the water 15 minutes later. The damage was initially recorded as a high explosive 8-inch (203 mm) cruiser shell. However, Japanese records dispute this, insisting the hit was scored by an 18.1-inch (46 cm) shell from Yamato from around 20,000 yards. On paper, the difference between a cruiser round and a battleship round should have been apparent, but Yamato, having mistaken Gambier Bay for a full-sized fleet carrier, was firing armor-piercing shells that over-penetrated her hull without exploding. Most photographs of Gambier Bay under fire show her under attack from six-gun salvos and white splashes, corresponding with Yamato's gun layout, firing angle, and undyed shells. The Japanese heavy cruisers also never switched to high explosive shells (as evidenced by the damage inflicted to USS Kalinin Bay and USS Fanshaw Bay by Tone and Haguro); thus any cruiser shells that hit the ship would not have exploded.

==== Final moments ====
Kongō then switched fire from an enemy destroyer to Gambier Bay at 26,300 yards. At 8:24, two 18.1-inch (46 cm) shells hit Gambier Bay, one hit amidships below the waterline and cut through a fresh water tank, flooding the ship with sea water, while another sliced through her bow. These hits were claimed by both Yamato and Kongō, but Yamato was at a much closer range and had the matching firing angle, awarding her the hits. At 8:28, two more hits from Yamato made their mark, the former a 6.1-inch (155 mm) shell which exploded in her hangar bay, and the latter an 18.1-inch (46 cm) shell that tore through her flight deck and started a fire which was never put out by damage control for the rest of the time the ship was afloat. Simultaneously, a column of Japanese heavy cruisers engaged an enemy aircraft carrier which was close to Gambier Bay's position, leading several historians to conclude they assisted in battering her, but evidence proves their target was Kalinin Bay, the escort carrier right next to Gambier Bay.

At 8:30, a high explosive shell, probably from Yamato's secondary battery, exploded in Gambier Bay's officer quarters, causing minor damage; another shell ripped through her bulkhead at 8:32. Simultaneously, an attempt was made by the destroyers Johnston, Hoel and Heermann to cover Gambier Bay. This achieved only partial success: Kongō engaged Heermann, but Yamato only engaged and helped to sink Hoel with her secondary battery and continued to pound Gambier Bay with her main battery, scoring another two hits at 8:37 which destroyed Gambier Bay's steering and fuel supply, followed by another hit at 8:43. By 8:45, Gambier Bay had fully stopped, prompting Yamato to cease fire and turn north and the light cruiser Noshiro to fire on her. At 8:50, the abandon ship order was issued as a result Yamato's gunfire damage. As Gambier Bay was being abandoned by her crew, two 6-inch (152 mm) shells from Noshiro exploded in her store keeper's office. Fires raged through the riddled escort carrier, and she capsized at 09:07 and sank at 09:11, at approximately 11°31′N 126°12′E. Her sinking was witnessed by Yamato, which was concluded to have sunk one enemy "fleet carrier". Most of her nearly 800 survivors were rescued two days later by landing and patrol craft dispatched from Leyte Gulf. 147 crewmen were killed. The Americans also lost four other ships in the battle—St. Lo, Hoel, Samuel B. Roberts, and Johnston. Gambier Bay was the only US Navy aircraft carrier sunk exclusively by surface naval gunfire during World War II, and one of only three worldwide (along with HMS Glorious in 1940 and IJN Chiyoda in 1944, albeit the latter first being crippled by aircraft).

Aircraft from "Taffy 2" joined in the battle off Samar. The events that followed were described by Admiral Sprague:

"At 09:25 my mind was occupied with dodging torpedoes when near the bridge I heard one of the signalmen yell 'They're getting away!' I could hardly believe my eyes, but it looked as if the whole Japanese fleet was indeed retiring. However, it took a whole series of reports from circling planes to convince me. And still I could not get the fact to soak into my battle-numbed brain. At best, I had expected to be swimming by this time."

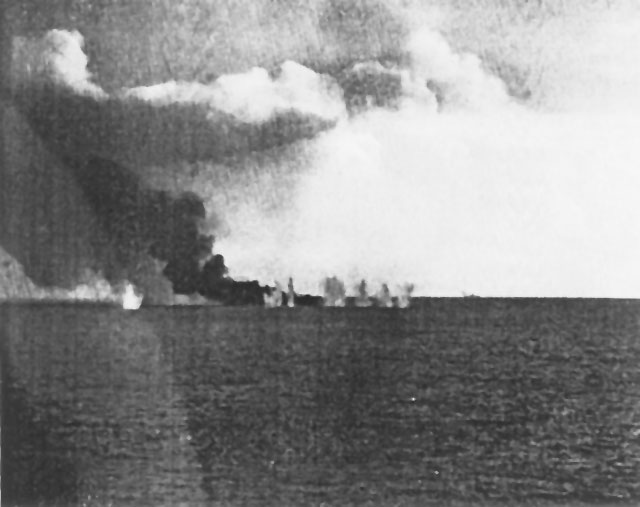
Gambier Bay, burning from earlier gunfire damage, is straddled by a salvo from Kongō.

Gambier Bay's VC-10 Squadron and other ships of "Taffy 3"—aided by planes of "Taffy 2"—had stopped the powerful Japanese Center Force and inflicted significant losses. Three enemy cruisers were sunk, and much damage was inflicted on the other ships. Overall, the overwhelmingly powerful Japanese surface fleet had been turned back by the escort carriers and their screen of destroyers and destroyer escorts.

== Awards ==
Gambier Bay received four battle stars for service in World War II and shared in the award of the Presidential Unit Citation to "Taffy 3" for extraordinary heroism in the Battle off Samar. Commanding officer Captain Walter V. R. Vieweg received the Navy Cross for his "extraordinary heroism". Executive officer Richard R. Ballinger received the Silver Star "for conscious gallantry and intrepidity".

== See also ==
- List of U.S. Navy losses in World War II
