= Marine Corps Logistics Command =

Major command of the U.S. Marine Corps

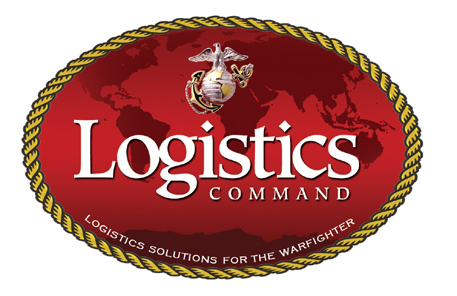
- MARCORLOGCOM insignia
- Country: United States of America
- Allegiance: United States of America
- Branch: United States Marine Corps
- Type: Major Command
- Role: Logistics
- Garrison/HQ: Marine Corps Logistics Base Albany, Albany, Georgia
- Motto(s): Logistics Solutions for the Warfighter

Commanders
- Current commander: MajGen Keith D. Reventlow

The Marine Corps Logistics Command (MARCORLOGCOM) is a major command of the United States Marine Corps responsible for providing support for fielded weapons systems, support services and supplies.

Marine Corps Logistics Command (LOGCOM) is part of the Marine Corps Installations and Logistics Enterprise, providing logistics and weapon system life cycle management support at the operational level. LOGCOM links the Marine Corps Organic Industrial Base with operational logistics activities, ensuring materiel readiness and service-specific force sustainment by executing depot-level maintenance, storage, and prepositioning for the Supporting Establishments, regional or functional Marine Corps Forces, the Marine Expeditionary Forces, and Marine Forces Reserve.

As the Service-level Inventory Control Point and Supply Depot, LOGCOM manages the inventory of Marine Corps equipment, mainly for Classes II, VII, and IX and supports system sustainment and supply chain management of Marine Corps ground equipment in coordination with Marine Corps Systems Command and Program Executive Officer Land Systems.

LOGCOM coordinates with the Deputy Commandant for Plans, Policies, and Operations (DC PP&O), Deputy Commandant for Installations and Logistics (DC I&L) and affected Marine Forces to manage logistics within any theater of operations throughout the operational continuum, from day-to-day campaigning to armed conflict.

== Subordinate commands ==
- Blount Island Command (Blount Island, Jacksonville, Florida)
- Marine Corps Depot Maintenance Command (Marine Corps Logistics Base Albany, Albany, Georgia)
  - Production Plant Albany (MCLB Albany, Albany, Georgia)
  - Production Plant Barstow (MCLB Barstow, Barstow, California)
- Marine Force Storage Command (Marine Corps Logistics Base Albany, Albany, Georgia)

== See also ==
- List of United States Marine Corps installations
- United States Army Materiel Command
- Naval Supply Systems Command (U.S. Navy)
- Air Force Materiel Command (U.S. Air Force)
