= Marine Corps Logistics Base Albany =

US Marine Corps base near Albany, Georgia, United States

- Near Albany, Georgia in the United States
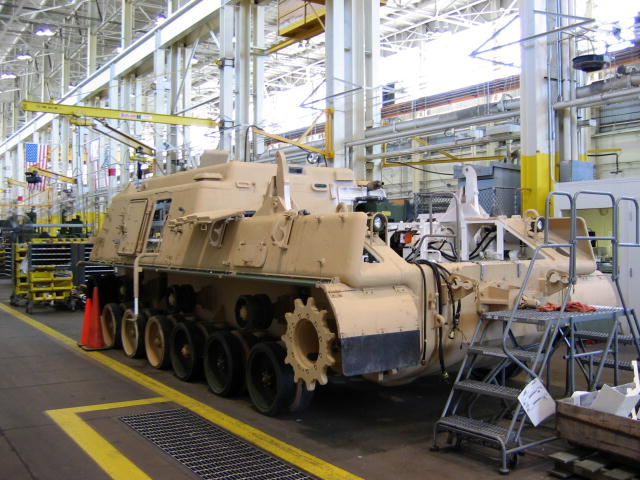
- A M88 Recovery Vehicle undergoes depot maintenance at MCLB Albany in 2005

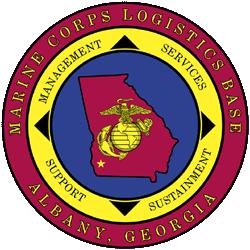

Site information
- Type: Marine Corps logistics base
- Owner: Department of Defense
- Operator: US Marine Corps
- Controlled by: Marine Corps Installations East
- Condition: Operational
- Website: Official website

Location
- Location in the United States
- Coordinates: 31°33′00″N 84°03′15″W

Site history
- Built: 1952 (as Marine Corps Depot of Supplies)
- In use: 1952 – present

Garrison information
- Current commander: Colonel Matthew J. McKinney

Marine Corps Logistics Base Albany is a United States Marine Corps base located just outside Albany, Georgia. The primary mission of the units on the base is to rebuild and repair ground combat and combat support equipment and to support installations on the East Coast of the United States. Today one of MCLB Albany's most important facilities is the Marine Corps Logistics Command's Maintenance Center. The only other facility of this kind is located at MCLB Albany's sister installation, Marine Corps Logistics Base Barstow, California. The base comprises more than 3,300 acres (13 km^{2}) and in 2002 employed more than 2,400 civilians along with a complement of 600 Marines. One of the Corps' major commands, Marine Corps Logistics Command, is based at MCLB Albany. The command also encompasses activities at bases in Barstow, California, and Jacksonville, Florida.

== History ==
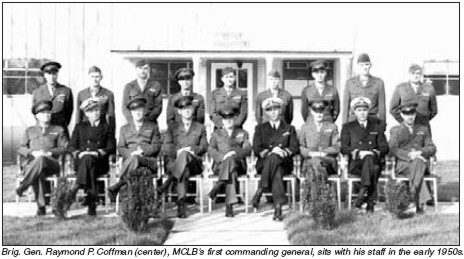
Brig. Gen. Raymond P. Coffman and his staff

The base was commissioned on March 1, 1952, as the Marine Corps Depot of Supplies. At that time, Marine Brigadier General Raymond P. Coffman assumed command and a small contingent of Marines established headquarters in temporary buildings.

Albany was chosen as the site for the logistics base after a two-year search in the early 1950s for a level area convenient to the Gulf of Mexico and the Atlantic Ocean and serviced by road and rail. Albany was also attractive for its inland location, well away from the possibility of saltwater corrosion of the stored equipment, and its adequate workforce.

Construction continued rapidly, and by early 1954, the station was sufficiently complete with warehouses and administration buildings to assume supply support for Marines east of the Rocky Mountains and in the Atlantic area. On July 29, 1954, the command was renamed the Marine Corps Supply Center Albany. The MCSC managed and controlled supplies at storage and issue locations in the eastern half of the United States, the Caribbean Sea and the Mediterranean Sea areas. Depot level rebuild operations began to function at the base in October 1954.

The base opened in 1954, as the Marine Corps Depot of Supplies. In 1959, renamed the Marine Corps Supply Center, it was assigned the mission of rebuilding nonaviation equipment.

The MCSC Albany was redesignated Marine Corps Logistics Support Base Atlantic on April 1, 1976, because the Marine Corps Supply Activity at Philadelphia and its inventory control, financial management, procurement and technical support functions were relocated to the Albany installation.

On November 1, 1978, the installation was renamed once again – Marine Corps Logistics Base Albany. The full spectrum of logistics support functions required to support the Marine Corps ground weapon systems and equipment was now performed at this base.

On January 17, 1990, the Commandant of the Marine Corps designated the commanding general at MCLB Albany to also take on the responsibilities of commander, Marine Corps Logistics Bases. The reorganization placed control of MCLB Albany, MCLB Barstow, and the Blount Island Command in Jacksonville, Florida, under this single commander.

== Environment and archaeology ==
Preserving the environment and the wildlife in and around the base has been a priority since the early planning phases of the facility. Colonel A.E. Dubber, the officer who chose the Albany site, insisted early on that he wanted no wildlife disturbed unnecessarily and that as many trees as possible should be saved. Because of his policies the base is lined with pecan orchards and rows of oaks. The so-called Dubber Oak, upon which the base was aligned during construction, still stands near the main gate.

In 1973 more than 200 Indian artifacts were discovered on the base. Arrowheads, flint knives, scrapers, and other ancient tools estimated to be more than 8,000 years old were unearthed by archaeologists. Their presence suggests that the area may have been a trading or supply post for Native Americans.

The EPA has conducted tests (and continues to monitor) the contamination by hazardous substances on the base of the ground and the drinking water supply.

== Persian Gulf War ==
From the beginning of the historic buildup of U.S., Arab and other allied air, ground and naval forces against Iraq during 1990 and 1991 until Operation Desert Storm ended, MCLB Albany and its personnel were deeply involved in the greatest surge of activity in the history of the base. Between August 10, 1990, and March 31, 1991, MCLB Albany provided support to the Marine Air-Ground Task Forces sent to the Persian Gulf area.

During the Persian Gulf War (1990–91) the base's workforce shipped more than 9 million pounds of equipment to air and seaports for rapid transport to troops abroad. Personnel also installed twenty-six "tractor protective kits" on bulldozers used to break through Iraqi barriers and minefields. The armored bulldozers helped open the way for coalition troops to overrun enemy defenses.

During the first phase of activation of Prepositioned War Reserves, MCLB Albany's Materiel Division (today, MCLB Fleet Support Division and DLA Defense Distribution Depot Albany) shipped more than nine million pounds of goods and equipment on more than 300 semi-trailer trucks to airports and seaports of embarkation to Saudi Arabia. The division's support continued throughout the crises as its personnel established around the clock operations and worked nearly 50,000 overtime hours packing goods that included 4,800 supplemental items packs and other high priority requisitions for U.S. military personnel.

MCLB Albany also provided medical support throughout the crises. Two doctors, eight medical corpsmen and one independent duty technician from the Naval Branch Medical Clinic at the base deployed to the Persian Gulf. Additionally, the Air Force Medical Logistics team at the base had four air transportable hospitals (ATHs) that were assembled at the base prepositioned in the Persian Gulf area. Two additional ATHs, along with 895,000 pounds of additional medical materials and equipment that were assembled at the base were also sent to the Gulf War area.

The Publications Branch at the base sent 29,000 publications and technical manuals to reconstitute the Maritime Prepositioned Force in Saudi Arabia. This work continued for nearly a year after the war ended.

The Maintenance Center performed a myriad of projects and support activities during the war, many of which were innovative and were accomplished in record time. Notable among the Maintenance Center's support were personnel who developed and installed 26 Tractor Protective Kits on II Marine Expeditionary Force's bulldozers in the Persian Gulf area. These armor-plated bulldozers broke the paths through Saddam Hussein’s so-called "Wall of Death" minefields and other fortified barriers, opening the roads along which the Marine divisions pursued and defeated the Iraqi army.

More than 100 MCLB Albany Marines, Navy personnel and civilian employees served in Saudi Arabia and the Persian Gulf during Operation Desert Shield and Operation Desert Storm.

== See also ==
- List of United States Marine Corps bases
- Lex (dog)
