= Harold B. Sallada =

United States admiral (1895–1977)

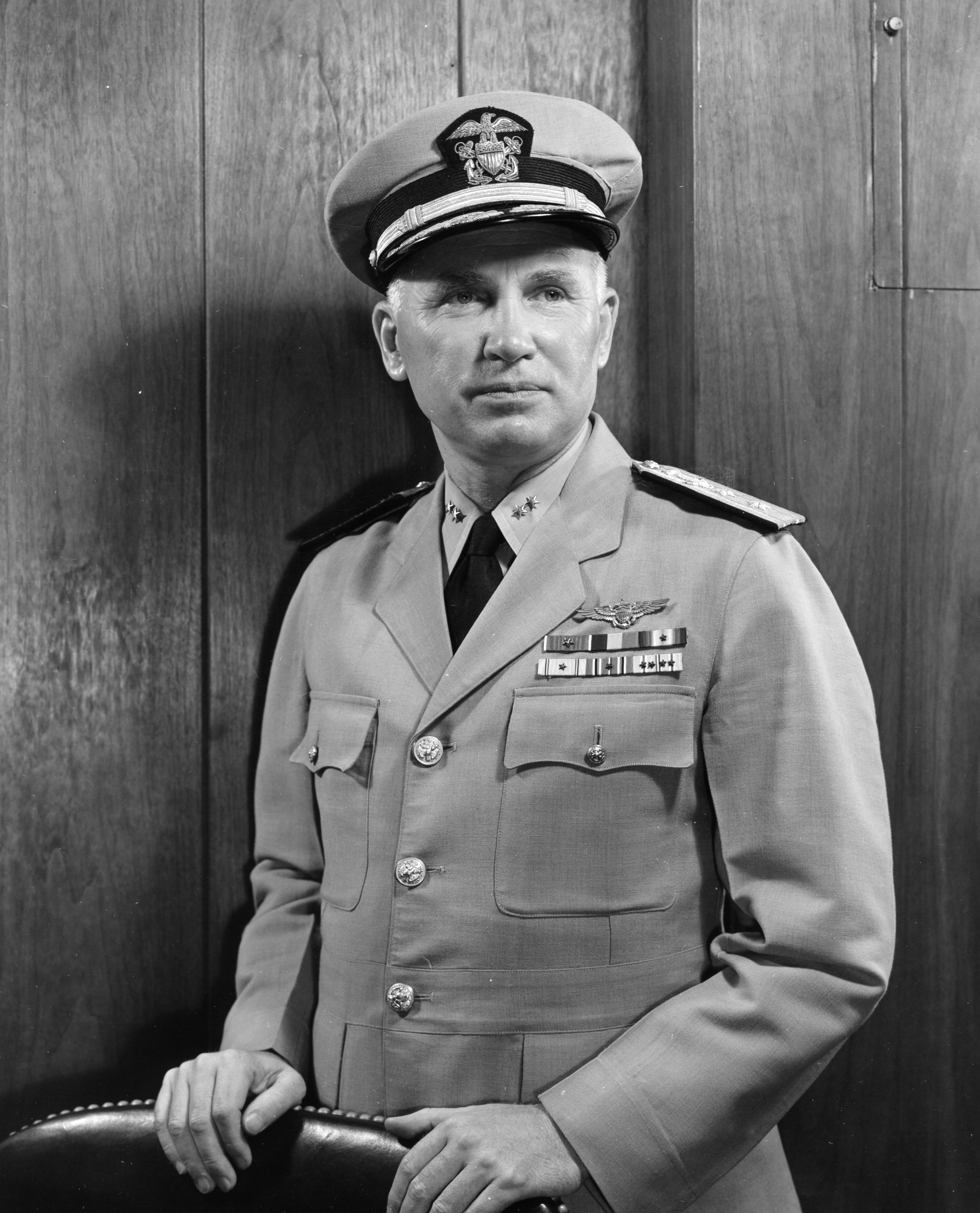
- Born: January 23, 1895; Pennsylvania, US
- Died: April 25, 1977 (aged 82); Arlington County, Virginia, US
- Burial place: Arlington National Cemetery
- Education: United States Naval Academy
- Military career
- Allegiance: United States
- Branch: United States Navy
- Service years: 1917–1949
- Rank: Vice admiral
- Commands: Commander, Naval Air Forces; United States Pacific Fleet; Naval Base San Diego; United States Fleet Forces Command; Bureau of Aeronautics
- Conflicts: World War I World War II
- Awards: Legion of Merit (3); Navy and Marine Corps Medal
- Other work: Vice president of Chance Vought Aircraft, Inc.

Harold Bushnell Sallada (January 23, 1895 – April 25, 1977) was an admiral and naval aviator in the United States Navy. He served in the US navy as a vice admiral and retired from the service in October 1949 as a four star admiral. Before his retirement, he was assigned commander United States Pacific Fleet at San Diego.

== Biography ==
Sallada was born on January 23, 1895, in Williamsport, Pennsylvania, and later moved to Arlington, Texas. He graduated from the United States Naval Academy in 1917 and the Naval War College, and became a naval aviator in 1921. His was first appointment as commander USS Albemarle (AV-5) in 1941 until he was promoted to the rank of captain with the second assignment as director of Bureau of Aeronautics for Plans Division on August 23, 1942. He was promoted to the rank of rear admiral in 1944 and subsequently was assigned commander Carrier Division 26. In the same year from 24 July to 1 August 1944, he commanded five escort carriers in the Battle of Tinian. He also commanded Carrier Division 6. As a rear admiral, he appointed as the chief of the Bureau of Aeronautics. During his assignment at the Bureau of Aeronautics, he played a central role for the development of slant-deck aircraft carriers.

=== Later work ===
After retirement, he joined Fairchild Engine and Airplane Corp. and worked at its aircraft division as a manager of the Chicago plant. In 1952, he became vice president and a member of the board of directors at Chance Vought Aircraft, Inc. until he retired in 1960.
