= Frank Peak Akers =

American naval admiral

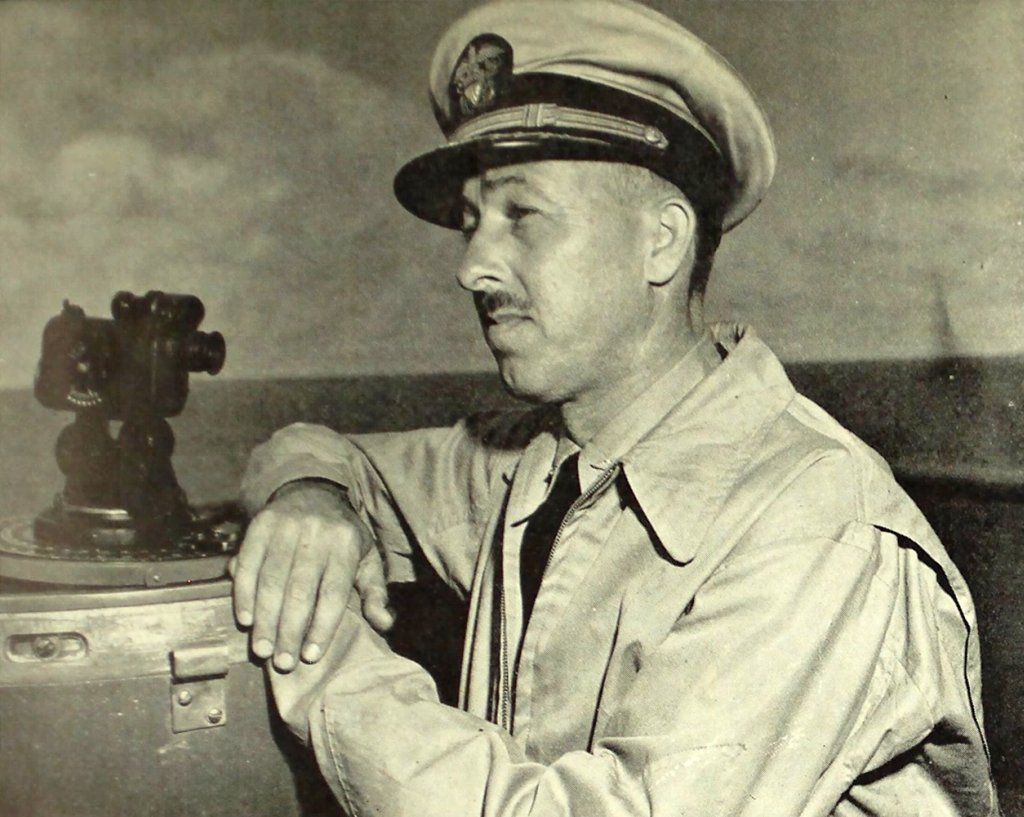
- Commander of the USS Saratoga (CV-3), c. 1945
- Born: March 28, 1901; Nashville, Tennessee, U.S.
- Died: March 22, 1988 (aged 86)
- Education: US Naval Acad (BS); Harvard Univ. (MS)
- Spouse: Bayliss House Akers
- Children: Albert B. Akers
- Military career
- Allegiance: United States
- Branch: US Navy
- Service years: 1922–1963
- Rank: Rear Admiral
- Conflicts: Battle of Midway; Doolittle Raid
- Awards: Dist Flying Cross; Legion of Merit

Frank Peak Akers (March 28, 1901 – March 22, 1988) was an American naval rear admiral who was the first aviator to make an instrument landing aboard an aircraft carrier.

== Military career ==
Frank Akers graduated from the US Naval Academy in 1922 and was soon assigned to the USS Sumner, which operated in the Pacific Ocean. On 11 September 1925, he earned his naval "Wings of Gold" and became an aviator. He later earned a master's degree in electrical engineering from Harvard University in 1933. After graduation, he became a flight test officer at the Naval Air Station in San Diego, California. While in this assignment on 30 July 1935, he participated in an unusually hazardous experiment and attempted to land about the nation's first aircraft carrier, the USS Langley. What made this hazardous was that he was fitted with a special hood preventing visual contact with the outside world. He earned the Distinguished Flying Cross for being the first to land a plane on a carrier deck without sight.

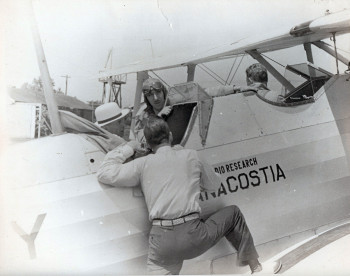
Lieutenant Frank Akers (wearing flight helmet) shows Rear Admiral Ernest J. King (wearing civilian hat), the chief of the Bureau of Aeronautics, the cockpit of the OJ-2 in which he performed the Navy's first demonstration of a blind landing system intended for use on board aircraft carriers. He made the landing "under the hood" at College Park, Maryland.

During World War II, he served as a navigator about the USS Hornet, and participated in the famed Doolittle Raid on Tokyo and in the Battle of Midway. Later in the war, while stationed in Washington as head of the Radio and Electrical Branch of the Bureau of Aeronautics, he received the Legion of Merit for his part in developing more efficient and simplified aircraft electronic systems, including radar bombing.

After the war, as the commanding officer of the USS Saratoga from 1945 to 1946, he amassed a new world's record of 642 carrier landings in a single day. He is also the only aviator ever to have been assigned as Assistant Chief of Naval Operations for Undersea Warfare, from 1951 to 1954. On 11 January 1962, he received the Gray Eagle Award honoring him as the Naval Aviator who had been flying longer than any other on active duty, which he held until his retirement on 1 April 1963.

== Legacy ==
The Navy's annual award to outstanding Airborne Early Warning squadrons was renamed for Akers.
