= John Higgins (admiral) =

United States Navy rear admiral

John Martin Higgins
- Born: 15 August 1899; Madison, Wisconsin, U.S.
- Died: 7 December 1973 (aged 74)
- Military career
- Allegiance: United States
- Branch: United States Navy
- Service years: 1922–1961
- Rank: Rear Admiral
- Commands: USS Gwin; Destroyer Division 23; USS Wisconsin; Cruiser Division 5 Pacific Fleet Mine Force
- Conflicts: World War II; Korean War
- Awards: Navy Cross; Navy Distinguished Service Medal; Silver Star; Legion of Merit with valor device (2)

John Martin Higgins (August 15, 1899 – December 7, 1973) was a rear admiral (upper half) in the United States Navy.

== Biography ==
Higgins was born in Madison, Wisconsin, in 1899. Graduating from the United States Naval Academy in 1922, he served prior to World War II in battleships, destroyers and other surface ships, as well as on periodic shore duty. In 1941–42, he commanded the destroyer Gwin. Promoted to captain in mid-1942, during the rest of World War II he led several destroyer units in combat in the Central Solomons, off Iwo Jima and Okinawa and during raids on Japan.

As Commander of Destroyer Division 23, Higgins was aboard Gwin when she was torpedoed at the Battle of Kolombangara on 13 July 1943. Two officers and 59 men were killed and Gwin was later scuttled. For his "aggressive and brilliant leadership" during this battle, as well as his "extraordinary heroism and distinguished service" during the preceding New Georgia Campaign, Higgins was awarded the Navy Cross.

Following the Japanese surrender, Higgins held important staff positions and was commanding officer of the battleship Wisconsin (March 1947–January 1948). After promotion to the rank of rear admiral, he commanded Cruiser Division 5, and was also commander of the Southern and Eastern Support Groups in operations against enemy forces in the Korean War from 25 June to 27 December 1950. For his "exceptionally meritorious and distinguished service" Higgins was awarded the Navy Distinguished Service Medal.

In 1951–52, he led the Pacific Fleet Mine Force. Higgins held several shore billets during the remainder of his service, including commandant of two naval districts, and Chief of the Military Advisory Group, Japan, in 1957–59. He retired from active duty in September 1961.

Rear Admiral John M. Higgins died on 7 December 1973.

== Citations ==
Navy Cross:

The President of the United States of America takes pleasure in presenting the Navy Cross to Commander John Martin Higgins (NSN: 0-57597), United States Navy, for extraordinary heroism and distinguished service in the line of his profession as Commander, Destroyer Division 23, engaged in the New Georgia Islands Operations against enemy Japanese forces in the Solomon Islands Area from June 30 to July 13, 1943. Despite repeated attacks by hostile aircraft, submarines, and shore batteries, Commander Higgins handled his ships with such distinguished ability that the transport unloaded and retired without damage. Participating in the Second Battle of Kula Gulf, on the night of 12–July 13, Commander Higgins displayed aggressive and brilliant leadership, contributing materially to the complete destruction of four and probably six enemy vessels. Commander Higgins' conduct throughout was in keeping with the highest traditions of the Navy of the United States.

Navy Distinguished Service Medal:

The President of the United States of America takes pleasure in presenting the Navy Distinguished Service Medal to Rear Admiral John Martin Higgins (NSN: 0-57597), United States Navy, for exceptionally meritorious and distinguished service in a position of great responsibility to the Government of the United States, as Commander Cruiser Division FIVE, and commander Southern and Eastern Support Groups in operations against enemy aggressor forces in the Korean Area from June 25 to December 27, 1950. At the commencement of hostilities, Rear Admiral Higgins, as the only subordinate Flag Officer Afloat in this area, was solely responsible for effecting Naval coordination with friendly ground forces and, during the difficult early days of the conflict, continued to perform this vital function. In conjunction with personnel of the Korean Military Advisory Group, he initiated an extremely effective shore-controlled gunfire system which disrupted North Korean communications and operations of military personnel along the East Korean coast by destroying bridges, railroads and troop concentrations and caused almost total interdiction of movement along the coastal route. Rear Admiral Higgins also directed the sustained bombardment of strong enemy shore installations at Inch'on, Korea, which was completely effective and contributed a large measure of success to this difficult operation. His leadership, professional ability and devotion to duty throughout reflect great credit upon the United States Naval Service.

Silver Star:

The President of the United States of America, authorized by Act of Congress July 9, 1918, takes pleasure in presenting the Silver Star (Army Award) to Rear Admiral John Martin Higgins (NSN: 0-57597), United States Navy, for conspicuous gallantry and intrepidity in action as Commander, Cruiser Division FIVE, Joint Task Force SEVEN, United Nations Command, in action in the Inchon-Seoul operation during the period 15 September to 21 September 1950. His actions contributed materially to the success of this operation and were in keeping with the highest traditions of the military service.

First Legion of Merit:

The President of the United States of America takes pleasure in presenting the Legion of Merit with Combat "V" to Commodore John Martin Higgins (NSN: 0-57597), United States Navy, for exceptionally meritorious conduct in the performance of outstanding services to the Government of the United States as Screen Commander operating with a fast carrier Task Force in Western Pacific waters from 1 July 1945 to the close of hostilities against the Japanese Empire on 15 August 1945. During this period he participated in strikes against Kyushu, Shikoku, Honshu, and Hokkaido. With unremitting effort and determination he achieved a high standard of combat readiness and fighting efficiency throughout the task unit under his command. By his initiative, perseverance and ability he contributed materially to the success of those major operations against the enemy. His outstanding service and performance of duty were at all times in keeping with the highest traditions of the United States Naval Service. (Commodore Higgins is authorized to wear the Combat "V".)

Second Legion of Merit:

The President of the United States of America takes pleasure in presenting a Gold Star in lieu of a Second Award of the Legion of Merit with Combat "V" to Commodore John Martin Higgins (NSN: 0-57597), United States Navy, for exceptionally meritorious conduct in the performance of outstanding services to the Government of the United States as Screen Commander of a Fast Carrier Task Group in operations against the enemy during the period from 26 January 1945 to 18 April 1945. In command of an important unit of our forces in operations against the enemy's shore installations, air power, and forces afloat, his inspiring leadership maintained the fighting efficiency of the ships under his command at a high peak, and made possible an outstanding record of destruction wreaked upon the enemy on land, at sea, and in the air. His cool and resourceful exercise of command in battle, when ships of the Task Group were subjected to intense and determined enemy air attack, were of invaluable assistance to the Task Group Commander in repelling these attacks, and in thus maintaining the offensive power of our ships and aircraft. His courageous, inspiring leadership was at all times in keeping with the highest traditions of the United States Naval Service. (Commodore Higgins is authorized to wear the Combat "V".)
