= Sherm Clark =

American rower and rear admiral

Personal information
- Born: Sherman Rockwell Clark; November 16, 1899 Baltimore, Maryland, United States
- Died: November 8, 1980 (aged 80) Annapolis, Maryland, United States
- Height: 170 cm (5 ft 7 in)
- Weight: 52 kg (115 lb)

Sport
- Sport: Rowing
- Club: US Naval Academy
Medal record
Men's rowing
Representing the United States
Olympic Games
Gold medal – first place	1920 Antwerp	Men's eight
Silver medal – second place	1920 Antwerp	Men's coxed four

Sherman Rockwell Clark (November 16, 1899 – November 8, 1980) was an American rowing coxswain who competed in the 1920 Summer Olympics.

In 1920, he was coxed the American boat from the United States Naval Academy, which won the gold medal in the men's eight. He also won the silver medal as coxswain of the American boat in the coxed four event.

He graduated from the United States Naval Academy in 1922. He retired as a rear admiral.
