= Harold D. Hansen =

American Brigadier general

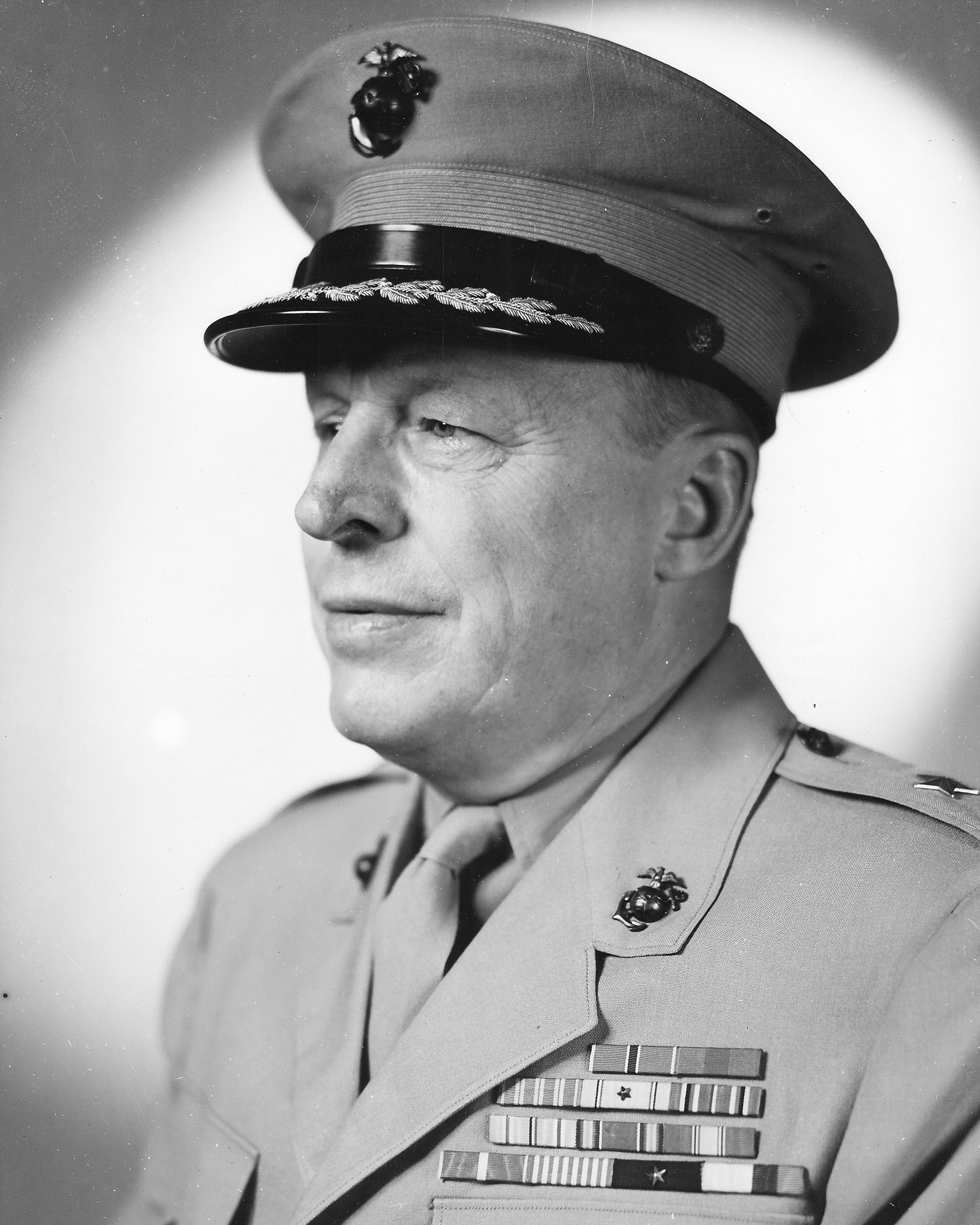
- Hansen as Brigadier general, USMC in July 1958
- Born: June 27, 1904; Ithaca, Nebraska, US
- Died: January 4, 1987 (aged 82); Philadelphia, Pennsylvania, US
- Burial place: Arlington National Cemetery
- Military career
- Allegiance: United States
- Branch: United States Marine Corps
- Service years: 1927-1961
- Rank: Brigadier general
- Nickname: "Swede"
- Commands: Assistant Quartermaster of the Marine Corps; MCSA Philadelphia
- Conflicts: Nicaraguan Campaign; Haitian Campaign; World War II; Korean War
- Awards: Bronze Star Medal

Harold Dale Hansen (June 27, 1904 – January 4, 1987) was an officer in the United States Marine Corps with the rank of brigadier general. A veteran of several conflicts, he trained as Quartermaster officer and distinguished himself as Quartermaster of Aircraft, Fleet Marine Force, Pacific during World War II.

Hansen rose to the general's rank and served successively as Director of Material Division, Supply Department and as Assistant Quartermaster of the Marine Corps, before he retired from active duty in June 1961.

== Early career ==
Harold D. Hansen was born on June 27, 1904, in Ithaca, Nebraska, and following the graduation from high school in Wahoo, Nebraska, in summer 1923, he received an appointment to the United States Naval Academy in Annapolis, Maryland. While at the Academy, Hansen was active in football and also served as Manager of the Tennis team and was nicknamed "Swede" due to his Scandinavian name.

Among his classmates were several future general officer including future Chief of Naval Operations George W. Anderson Jr.; Admiral John Thach, Vice admirals Glynn R. Donaho and Herbert D. Riley; Marine lieutenant generals John C. Munn and Alan Shapley; Major generals Marion L. Dawson, Samuel S. Jack, Jack P. Juhan, Francis M. McAlister, David F. O'Neill, Henry R. Paige and Brigadier generals Walter L. J. Bayler, Joseph E. Earnshaw, Archie E. O'Neil, Richard P. Ross Jr. and Earl S. Piper.

Upon graduation with Bachelor of Science degree on June 2, 1927, Hansen was commissioned second lieutenant in the Marine Corps and ordered to the Basic School at Philadelphia Navy Yard for officers' instruction. He completed the instruction in January 1928 and was attached to the 11th Marine Regiment, 2nd Marine Brigade, with which he sailed for expeditionary duty to Nicaragua.

Hansen participated in the peacekeeping operations during the Elections of 1928 and also participated in the training of Nicaraguan National Guard. Hansen remained in that country until the end of the year and received Nicaraguan Presidential Medal for Merit with Diploma for his service.

Upon his return to the United States in January 1929, he underwent preliminary aviation instruction at Quantico, Virginia, before he was ordered to the Naval Air Station Pensacola, Florida, for flight training. Unfortunately an eye injury which he suffered during the course, forced him to give up training. Hansen was hospitalized for several months, before he was declared fit for duty again.

Hansen was then attached to the staff of 1st Marine Brigade under Colonel Richard M. Cutts as Assistant Motor Transport Officer and sailed to Haiti in August 1929. He participated in the peacekeeping operations against hostile Cacos bandits until July 1930, when he was ordered back to the United States. Following his return, Hansen was ordered for instruction to the Army Motor Transport School at Camp Holabird, Maryland, from which he graduated in June 1931.

He was then ordered to the Marine Corps Depot of Supplies at Philadelphia, the main clothing depot, for duty as Assistant Motor Transport Officer. Hansen served there until March 1932, when he was transferred to the Marine Barracks Parris Island, South Carolina, where he remained until January 1934. He was subsequently assigned to the 7th Marine Regiment and participated in Caribbean maneuvers that month. The regiment was disbanded by the end of month and Hansen returned to Parris Island. He was promoted to first lieutenant in March 1934.

In August 1934, Hansen was transferred to the Office of Naval Intelligence, Navy Department in Washington, D.C., and together with Major Maurice G. Holmes were ordered to Ecuador, where they assisted with the establishing of the Naval School there. For his service in this capacity, Hansen was decorated with Ecuador Order of Abdon Calderón, 3rd Class.

Hansen rejoined the Office of Naval Intelligence few months later and remained there until September 1937. During his time in Washington, he was promoted to captain in July 1936. Due to his early experiences with Marine Aviation, Hansen was ordered to Naval Air Station San Diego, California, and assumed duty as Assistant Quartermaster of Aircraft 2, Fleet Marine Force. He was transferred to the Marine Barracks at Saint Thomas, Virgin Islands in January 1939 and served as Aviation Quartermaster, Base Air Detachment, which participated in the air patrols in the Caribbean.

== World War II and later career ==
Upon his promotion to Major in July 1941, Hansen returned to the United States and assumed duty as Quartermaster of the 1st Marine Aircraft Wing under Major General Roy S. Geiger at Marine Corps Base Quantico, Virginia. He moved with the Wing to San Diego following the United States entry into World War II in December 1941 and remained in that capacity until August 1942, when he was promoted to lieutenant colonel and transferred to the Headquarters Marine Corps in Washington, D.C.

Hansen was subsequently appointed Officer-in-Charge, Supply Section and later Quartermaster, Division of Aviation under his former superior officer, General Geiger and remained in that capacity until September 1944. Hansen was subsequently ordered to Hawaii, where he joined the headquarters of Aircraft, Fleet Marine Force, Pacific and served as Quartermaster and Assistant Chief of Staff for Logistics under Major General Francis P. Mulcahy. He was responsible for the planning and administration of logistics supplies such as food, ammunition, medical material, clothing, oil, construction materials or Repair parts and components for Fleet Marine Force, Pacific units until November 1945 and received Bronze Star Medal for his service.

He returned to the Headquarters Marine Corps in Washington, D.C., in November 1945 and assumed duty as Quartermaster of the Division of Aviation under Major General Field Harris. Hansen held that assignment until July 1948, when he was transferred to Camp Lejeune, North Carolina, and served as Commanding officer and Depot Quartermaster of the local Marine Corps Supply Depot. Hansen was later appointed Assistant Camp Supply Officer under Major General Franklin A. Hart, before he was ordered to the Marine Corps Supply Annex Barstow, California, in May 1951 for duty as commanding officer of that facility.

In March 1952, Hansen was transferred to Camp Pendleton, California, where he joined the headquarters of recently reactivated 3rd Marine Division under Major General Robert H. Pepper as Supply Officer. He accompanied the division to Japan in August 1953 and participated in the defense of the Far Eastern area against possible communist aggression. Hansen was ordered back to the United States in June 1954 and assumed duty as Head of the Engineer Supply Section, Supply Department at Headquarters Marine Corps.

Following his promotion to brigadier general in July 1955, Hansen was ordered to Philadelphia, where he assumed duty as Commanding general, Marine Corps Supply Activity. For next four years, he was responsible for the procurement, storage, maintaining, distribution and manufacturing of uniforms and minor equipage including hat ornaments, mosquito nets, mess pans, helmets, articles of uniforms, foot lockers, buckets, stoves, tent poles, bunks, etc.

Hansen was transferred back to the Headquarters Marine Corps in Washington, D.C., in July 1959 and assumed duty as Director, Material Division, Supply Department under Major General Roy M. Gulick. He remained in that capacity until January 1960, when he was appointed an Assistant Quartermaster General of the Marine Corps and Deputy to new Quartermaster chief, Major General Chester R. Allen. While in this capacity, he was co-responsible for the support of development, production, acquisition, and sustainment of general supply, Mortuary Affairs, subsistences, petroleum and water, material and distribution management during peace and war to provide combat power to the U.S. Marine Corps units. He also held additional duty as Deputy President of Naval Physical Disability Review Board.

== Retirement ==
Hansen remained in this capacity until his retirement on June 30, 1961, when he retired after 34 years of active duty. He then settled in Philadelphia, where he was active in Crime Prevention Association, and the Boy Scouts. Hansen lived in Philadelphia with his wife until his death on January 4, 1987, aged 82. Brigadier general Harold D. Hansen was buried with full military honors at Arlington National Cemetery, Virginia. He and his wife, Elizabeth Keys Lammie Hansen, had two children, a daughter, Dale Subkow and a son, Harold D. Hansen Jr., U.S. Naval Academy graduate.

== Decorations ==
Here is the ribbon bar of Brigadier General Harold D. Hansen:

1st Row	Bronze Star Medal	Marine Corps Expeditionary Medal	Second Nicaraguan Campaign Medal
2nd Row	American Defense Service Medal with Base Clasp	American Campaign Medal	Asiatic-Pacific Campaign Medal
3rd Row	World War II Victory Medal	National Defense Service Medal	Korean Service Medal
4th Row	United Nations Korea Medal	Nicaraguan Presidential Medal of Merit with Diploma	Ecuador Order of Abdon Calderón, 3rd Class

== See also ==
- United States Marine Corps Aviation

Military offices
Preceded by Chester R. Allen	Commanding Officer, Marine Corps Supply Annex Barstow; June 1951 - March 1952	Succeeded by A. J. Davis
