= Iowa's 95th House of Representatives district =

American legislative district

House District 95
- Type: District of the Lower house
- Location: Iowa
- Representative: Taylor Collins
- Parent organization: Iowa General Assembly

The 95th District of the Iowa House of Representatives in the state of Iowa. It is currently composed of Louisa County, as well as part of Muscatine, Henry, and Des Moines Counties.

== Current elected officials ==
Taylor Collins is the representative currently representing the district.

== Past representatives ==
The district has previously been represented by:

- Perry L. Christensen, 1971–1973
- Wendell C. Pellett, 1973–1983
- James O. Anderson, 1983–1985
- Michael K. Peterson, 1985–1993
- Harold Van Maanen, 1993–1999
- Jim Van Engelenhoven, 1999–2003
- Mike Reasoner, 2003–2011
- Joel Fry, 2011–2013
- Quentin Stanerson, 2013–2017
- Louie Zumbach, 2017–2021
- Charlie McClintock, 2021–2023
- Taylor Collins, 2023–Present
