= Taylor Collins =

American politician (born 1996)

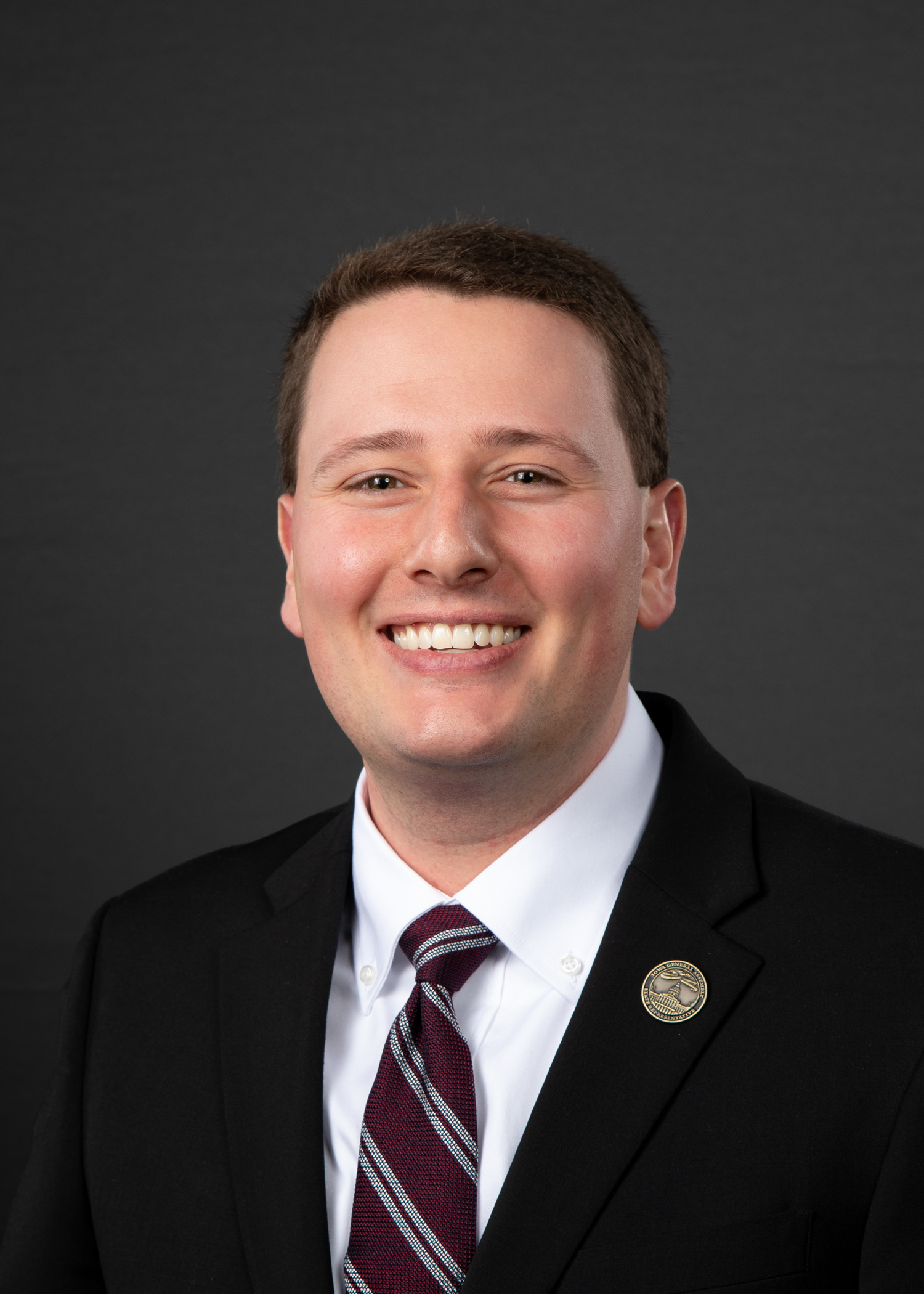

Member of the Iowa House of Representatives from the 95th district
- Incumbent
- Assumed office 9 January 2023
- Preceded by: Charlie McClintock

Personal details
- Born: 1996 (age 29–30) Macomb, Illinois, U.S.
- Party: Republican
- Education: Iowa State University; Drake University

Taylor Robert Collins (born 1996) is an American politician.

== Early life and education ==
Collins's great-grandparents, John and Betty McCulley Sr., founded Oakville Feed and Produce, later renamed TriOak Foods, in 1951. Collins was born in 1996, in Macomb, Illinois, and lives in Mediapolis, Iowa. He earned a bachelor's degree in business management at Iowa State University and a master's degree in public administration from Drake University. Collins has taught at Iowa Wesleyan University as an adjunct professor of economics and business.

Collins married Savannah Prescott in August 2023.

== Political career ==
In 2018, Collins served as president of the College Republicans at Iowa State University. After graduating, he chaired the Iowa Federation of College Republicans. Collins was a policy adviser to Kim Reynolds and a senior adviser to Adam Gregg. In January 2023, Collins began his campaign for the redrawn District 95 of the Iowa House of Representatives, as three-term lawmaker David Kerr announced his retirement and incumbent Charlie McClintock contested the District 42 seat in the Iowa Senate. During his first term in office, Collins served on the House Education Committee, responsible for determining the budgets of the University of Iowa, Iowa State University, and the University of Northern Iowa. Collins was floor manager for a bill which proposed that the budget allocated to diversity, equity, and inclusion initiatives at the three universities be used instead to lower the in-state tuition rate and fund scholarships for lower and middle income students.

Collins began his reelection campaign in February 2024. Collins faced former United Parcel Service worker Jeff Poulter in the general election.

In June 2026, Collins implied that universities in Iowa teach witchcraft.

=== Committee assignments ===
As of January 2025, Collins serves on the following committees in the Iowa House.

- Higher Education (chair)
- Appropriations
- Government Oversight
- Natural Resources
- State Government

Iowa House of Representatives
Preceded by Charlie McClintock	95th District; 2023 – present	Succeeded by Incumbent
