= Pellett =

Pellett is a surname. Notable people with the surname include:

- Wendell Pellett (1917–1996), American politician
- William Pellett (1809–?), English cricketer
