= Zumbach =

Zumbach is a surname. Notable people with the surname include:

- Andi Zumbach (born 1969), Swiss sports shooter
- Dan Zumbach (born 1960), American politician and farmer
- Jake Zumbach (born 1950), Canadian football player
- Jan Zumbach (1915–1986), Polish World War II flying ace
- Louie Zumbach (born 1965), American politician
