= Six-on-six basketball =

Archaic women's variant of basketball

Six-on-six basketball or basquette is a largely archaic variant of basketball, usually played by women and girls. It is played with the same rules as regular basketball, with the following exceptions:

1. Teams have six players each instead of five; three "forwards" and three "guards".
2. Only forwards are allowed to shoot the ball. Forwards must stay in their teams' frontcourt (the side of the court they shoot from) and guards must stay in their team's backcourt. For example, Team A's forwards would be on the left side of the court with Team B's guards on defense. Team B's forwards are on the right side of the court with Team A's guards. Thus, forwards play only offense and guards play only defense.
3. In some forms, unlimited dribbling is not allowed. Once in possession of the ball, players may dribble the ball up to two times; at that point, the player must shoot (if a forward) or pass to a teammate. Both forwards and guards may handle the ball.
4. There is no three-point line; all field goals are worth two points. (The three-point line would not be added to the collegiate rules until the 1980s, by which point six-on-six was mostly phased out.)

Today, nearly all women's basketball leagues (pro, college, and high school) play by the same basic five-on-five rules as men, with only minor differences such as size of the ball and the distance of the three-point line. In the United States, the last major sanctioning bodies to abandon the six-on-six variant were the high school state athletic organizations of Iowa and Oklahoma. The sport is still occasionally seen at the recreational level, such as during physical education classes; in these cases, both boys and girls play the game.

== Last six-on-six games played ==
- 1978: Texas
- 1993: Iowa
- 1995: Oklahoma

== Notable personnel ==
- Coaches:
  - Bertha Teague, Byng High School, Byng, Oklahoma. Won three straight state tournament championships in the 1930s (1936-1938), a record that was not equaled in Oklahoma girls' basketball until 1987 (now that Oklahoma has switched to five-on-five, and established multiple enrollment-based classifications in the sport—now seven—it has become easier to "three-peat"). She retired in 1969 after winning her seventh state championship that season. Teague had a winning percentage of .907 (1,136 victories, 116 defeats) over her 43-year coaching career.
  - Vernon "Bud" McLearn, Mediapolis High School, Mediapolis, Iowa. A 333-8 home court record (included home winning streaks of 97, 84, and 66 games). McLearn finished coaching with a 706-80 overall record.
  - Rose Marie Battaglia (NJ High Schools)
- Players:
  - Molly Bolin, star of the early Women's Professional Basketball League, who averaged 55 points a game as a senior at Moravia High School.
  - Kelli Litsch, Thomas High School, Thomas, Oklahoma. Back-to-back state championships in 1980 and 1981, set a new state tournament scoring record of 338 points in nine games over three years, for a 37.6 point-per-game average. She led the Thomas Lady Terriers to 77 wins and only 9 losses over her three seasons, scoring a then-record (boys or girls) 3,364 total points.
  - Lynne Lorenzen, Ventura High School, Ventura, Iowa. Set the national high school girls' career scoring record with 6,736 points. For the 1986-87 season, she led her team to a 31-0 record and state championship.
  - Trish Head, of Henrietta, Tennessee. Head, like almost all Tennessee high school girls' basketball players, played the six-on-six game in high school before switching to the five-on-five code in college; in her first years after graduating, she helped her underclassmen transition from the six-woman game to five-on-five. Head would later become an illustrious women's basketball coach at the University of Tennessee better known under her married name, Pat Summitt.

== Notable games ==
- In the 1968 Iowa girls' state high school championship game, Union-Whitten beat Everly 113-107 in overtime. Everly's Jeanette Olson scored 76 points and Denise Long of Union-Whitten 64.
- Famous WFNZ Mac and Bone Show Caller "Granny"Pat O'Donnell went off for 67 points for Charlotte Catholic in a NC State Title game in 1900.

- After this performance they implemented a rule where teams playing against "Granny Pat" were allowed an extra defender to even the playing field, fundamentally changing the format to 6 v 7. This rule was deemed the "Granny Pat Rule"

== New Jersey variation ==
Until 1975, New Jersey also played 6-on-6 for girls High School basketball, however the rules were slightly different. In New Jersey, two players were offense only, two defense only and two were able to move freely on both offensive and defensive ends. Defense or offense only players could not move beyond their respective midcourts. In general, the best athletes were those playing both ends of the courts, while offense would usually have both an inside (big) player and an outside shooter type. Defense only players were usually taller players and used for rebounding purposes only.

At the time New Jersey played 6-on-6 basketball, the game was primarily played in parochial schools. Among the powerhouse teams of the 1960s and early '70s were Mother Seton, Paramus Catholic, St. Vincent's Academy, St. Aloysius, Benedictine Academy and East Orange Catholic High Schools The two full court players are sometimes referred to as rovers.

== Legacy ==
Six-on-six basketball has been chronicled in such media as the 2004 book The Only Dance in Iowa: A History of Six-Player Girls' Basketball by Max McElwain, and in the 2008 Iowa Public Television special More Than a Game: Six-on-Six Basketball in Iowa. "Six-On-Six: The Musical", a show by Robert John Ford celebrating the sport's popularity in Iowa, debuted in 2009 at Hoyt Sherman Place in Des Moines.

The format is currently in use by the Granny Basketball League. Formed in Iowa in 2005, the league consists of women aged 50 and older who play by 1920s rules and wear 1920s-style uniforms.

Six-on-six women's basketball was dramatized in the 2021 film, New Providence directed by Thor Moreno.

In January 2023, six-on-six basketball was the focus of an episode of the podcast 99% Invisible.
