= William J. Scheyer =

U.S. Marine Corps general

William John Scheyer
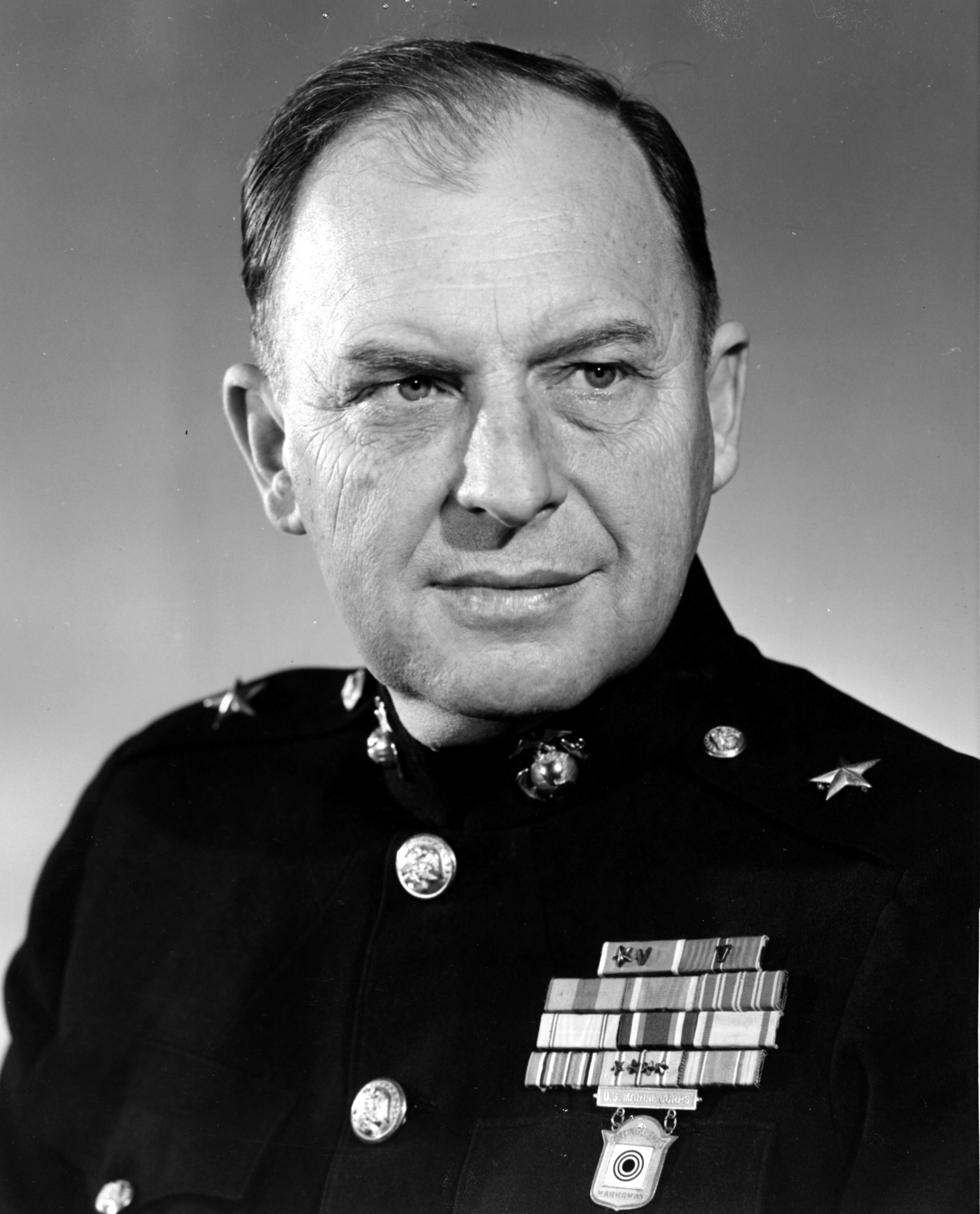
- Scheyer as brigadier general, USMC
- Born: March 6, 1900; Dunkirk, New York, US
- Died: May 14, 1956 (aged 56); San Diego, California, US
- Burial place: Arlington National Cemetery
- Military career
- Allegiance: United States of America
- Branch: United States Marine Corps
- Service years: 1923–1954
- Rank: Major general
- Service number: 0-3858
- Commands: Camp Pendleton; S-1 of III Marine Amphibious Corps; 9th Defense Battalion
- Conflicts: Haitian Campaign; Nicaraguan Campaign; Yangtze Patrol; World War II: Battle of Guadalcanal; Defense of Rendova Island; Battle of Saipan; Battle of Tinian; Recapture of Guam; Chinese Civil War
- Awards: Legion of Merit (2); Bronze Star Medal

William John Scheyer (March 6, 1900 – May 14, 1956) was a decorated officer of the United States Marine Corps, who reached the rank of major general. He is most noted as executive officer and later commanding officer of the 9th Defense Battalion during the Guadalcanal Campaign and the invasion of Rendova Island. Later he distinguished himself as Personnel Officer of III Marine Amphibious Corps during the Recapture of Guam.

== Early years ==
William J. Scheyer was born on March 6, 1900, in Dunkirk, New York, the son of William and Lucy Scheyer. Following graduation from high school, he received an appointment to the United States Naval Academy at Annapolis, Maryland, where he was nicknamed "Stoneface"; was active in rifle squad and also served as Manager of the Class Basketball.

Many of his classmates became general officers later: Arleigh Burke, Harry D. Felt, Merrill B. Twining, Charles F. Coe, George F. Good Jr., John B. Moss, Frederick Moosbrugger, Stanhope C. Ring, Thomas B. Williamson, William D. Anderson, Murr E. Arnold, John G. Crommelin, Paul F. Dugan, William H. Hamilton, Francis M. Hughes, Joseph L. Kane, William G. Manley, Henry G. Moran, Richard M. Oliver, Edwin R. Peck, John V. Peterson, William T. Rassieur, Merlin F. Schneider, Francis E. Shoup Jr., Curtis S. Smiley, Frederick C. Stelter Jr., Frank D. Weir, Ralph W.D. Woods, Howard L. Young, Richard M. Cutts Jr., Samuel G. Fuqua, Ira L. Kimes, Frank H. Lamson-Scribner or Henry A. Schade.

Scheyer graduated with Bachelor of Science degree on June 7, 1923, and was commissioned second lieutenant in the Marine Corps on the same day. He was subsequently ordered to the Basic School at Philadelphia Navy Yard for Officer' Instruction, which he completed several months later and was assigned to the Marine Corps Rifle and pistol team at Marine Corps Barracks Quantico, Virginia. Scheyer later participated in the National rifle and pistol matches at Wakefield, Massachusetts, and Camp Perry, Ohio.

In January 1924, Scheyer was attached to the Marine detachment aboard the USS Henderson and sailed for Coco Solo and later to Culebra, Puerto Rico. During his time in Caribbean, he was assigned to the 16th Company of the 5th Marine Regiment and took part in the Fleet Problem III as a part of the Marine Expeditionary Force during the exercise focused on a defense of the Panama Canal.

Following his return stateside in March 1924, Scheyer participated again in the National rifle and pistol matches at Camp Perry, Ohio, and later was transferred to the 77th Machine Gun Company, 2nd Battalion, 5th Marines in January 1925. He was appointed company officer within engineer battalion at Marine Barracks Quantico and remained in this capacity until December 1925, when he was attached to the First Brigade of Marines under Brigadier General John Twiggs Myers and sailed for Haiti. He spent next year in Port-au-Prince and later served with the same unit in Nicaragua.

Upon his return to the United States, Scheyer served at Marine Barracks Parris Island as post adjutant and later was promoted to the rank of first lieutenant in October, 1928. Scheyer was transferred to the 4th Marine Regiment as intelligence officer and sailed for China. In this capacity, he participated in the security of the Shanghai International Settlement until March 1932, when he was ordered back to the United States.

He then served as post adjutant at Marine Barracks Quantico until November 1933, when he was ordered to the battleship USS Wyoming. While aboard that vessel, Scheyer was appointed the intelligence officer within Company "C", 2nd Battalion, 7th Marine Regiment. He subsequently sailed for Cuba and participated in the expeditionary duty following the Cuban crisis. Scheyer was stationed at Marine Barracks within Guantanamo Bay Naval Base and was promoted to the rank of captain in May 1935.

The change of duty came in August 1935, when he was ordered stateside and assigned to the Marine Rifle and Pistol Team Detachment at Wakefield, Massachusetts. He participated in the rifle and pistol competitions in 1935 and won Distinguished Marksman Badge. Scheyer was subsequently appointed commanding officer of the Marine detachment aboard the battleship USS California in June 1937 and served in this capacity until June 1939.

== World War II ==
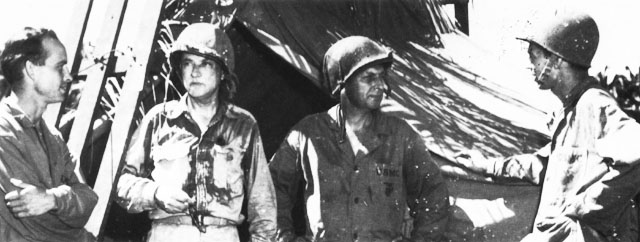
LtCol. Scheyer (3rd from the left) as the 9th Defense Battalion commander. He is shown at his New Georgia command post with Col. John W. Thomason, Jr., (2nd from left), from Admiral Nimitz' CinCPac headquarters at Pearl Harbor, and Maj Zedford W Burriss of the 10th Defense Battalion on the left. 1943.

Scheyer joined Marine Barracks at Philadelphia Navy Yard in June 1939 and was promoted to the rank of major one month later. He served there as the Senior Instructor at the Basic School until August 1942, when he was transferred to 9th Defense Battalion stationed at Guantanamo Bay, Cuba. Meanwhile, he was promoted to the rank of lieutenant colonel on May 16, 1942. Scheyer was appointed 9th battalion's executive officer under the command of Colonel David R. Nimmer and sailed for Pacific theater at the end of 1942. He arrived on Guadalcanal during December 1942 and participated in the capture and defense of Guadalcanal during December 1942 and February 1943. Scheyer distinguished himself in this capacity and was decorated with the Bronze Star Medal with Combat "V".

Colonel Nimmer was detached to the Headquarters Marine Corps in Washington, D.C., and Scheyer was appointed his substitute as commanding officer of the 9th Defense Battalion on April 18, 1943. After few months of participation in the consolidation of Southern Solomons, Scheyer led his battalion to Rendova Island at the beginning of July 1943. He successfully deployed the battalion Anti-aircraft weapons on the Island and thirty nine enemy planes were shot down during the conclusion of Munda Campaign. For his personal courage and leadership during that battle, Scheyer received the Legion of Merit with Combat "V" and Navy Unit Commendation.

Scheyer was promoted to the rank of colonel on September 26, 1943, and subsequently relinquished command to his executive officer, Archie E. O'Neil at the beginning November 1943. Scheyer was subsequently transferred to the staff of III Marine Amphibious Corps under Major General Roy S. Geiger and appointed personnel officer of the corps. He remained in this capacity for period of next year, participating in the Marshall Islands campaign. He returned to the United States in September 1944 and also received his second Legion of Merit for his work in the previous capacity.

His last wartime assignment was with the Officer's Performance Division at the Headquarters Marine Corps in Washington, D.C., where he was appointed officer in charge of the personnel section.

== Later career ==
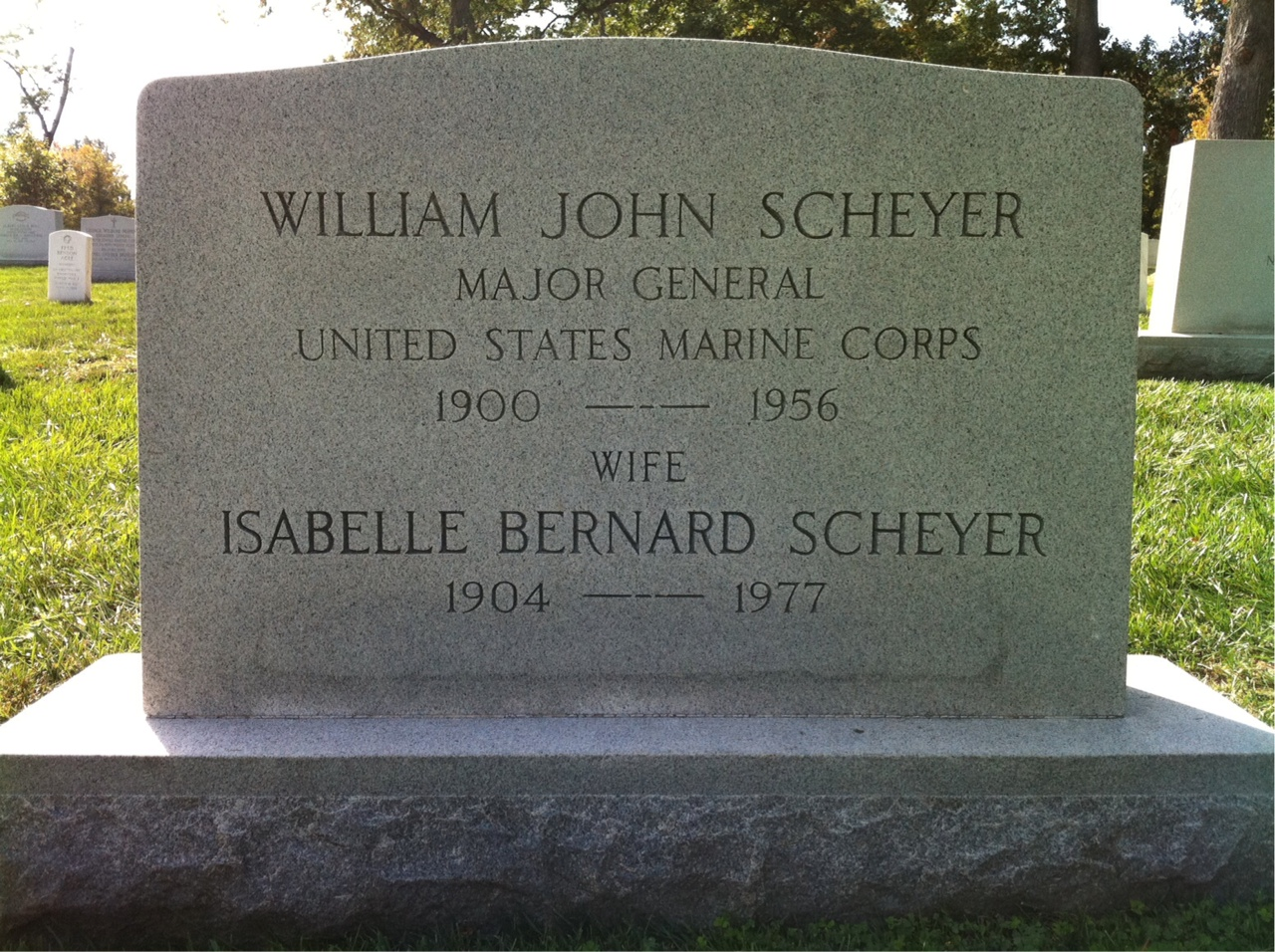
Scheyer's grave at Arlington National Cemetery

Scheyer served at Headquarters Marine Corps until August 1947, when he was transferred to Qingdao, China, and appointed chief of staff of the Fleet Marine Force, Western Pacific, under Brigadier General Omar T. Pfeiffer. In this capacity, he participated in the security of the United States Naval Training activities during the Chinese Civil War. Scheyer returned to the United States at the end of January 1949, when FMF West Pacific was ordered stateside.

Following the disbandment of this command, he was transferred to Marine Corps Base Quantico, where he was attached to the Marine Corps Schools as director of instruction, Academic Headquarters in February 1949. Scheyer remained in this capacity until June 1950, when he was ordered back to Washington, D.C., and appointed assistant director of personnel at Headquarters Marine Corps. While in this capacity, he was promoted to the rank of brigadier general in February 1951 and subsequently transferred to California, where he was appointed Deputy Commander of Camp Pendleton under Major General Robert H. Pepper.

General Scheyer assumed command of the Camp Pendleton in August 1953, but this assignment was only temporary and when new commanding general, James P. Riseley, arrived in October 1953, Scheyer returned to his capacity as Deputy Camp Commander. He remained in this capacity until March 1954, when he retired due to bad health. Following his retirement, Scheyer was advanced to the rank of major general for having been specially commended in combat

Scheyer died on May 14, 1956, at Naval Hospital, San Diego. He is buried at Arlington National Cemetery together with his wife, Isabelle R. Bernard Scheyer (1904–1977).

== Decorations ==
Here is the ribbon bar of Major General William J. Scheyer:

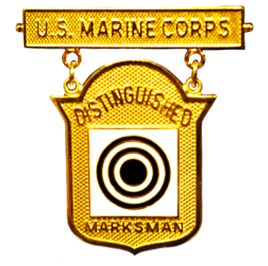

1st Row	Legion of Merit with Combat "V" and one 5/16" Gold Star	Bronze Star Medal with Combat "V"	Navy Unit Commendation	Marine Corps Expeditionary Medal
2nd Row	Second Nicaraguan Campaign Medal	Yangtze Service Medal	American Defense Service Medal	American Campaign Medal
3rd Row	Asiatic-Pacific Campaign Medal with four 3/16 inch service stars	World War II Victory Medal	China Service Medal	National Defense Service Medal

Military offices
Preceded by Robert H. Pepper	Commanding General of the Camp Pendleton; August 1953 – October 1953	Succeeded by James P. Riseley
Preceded by David R. Nimmer	Commanding Officer of the 9th Defense Battalion; April 18, 1943 – November 2, 1943	Succeeded by Archie E. O'Neil
