= Charlie McClintock =

American politician

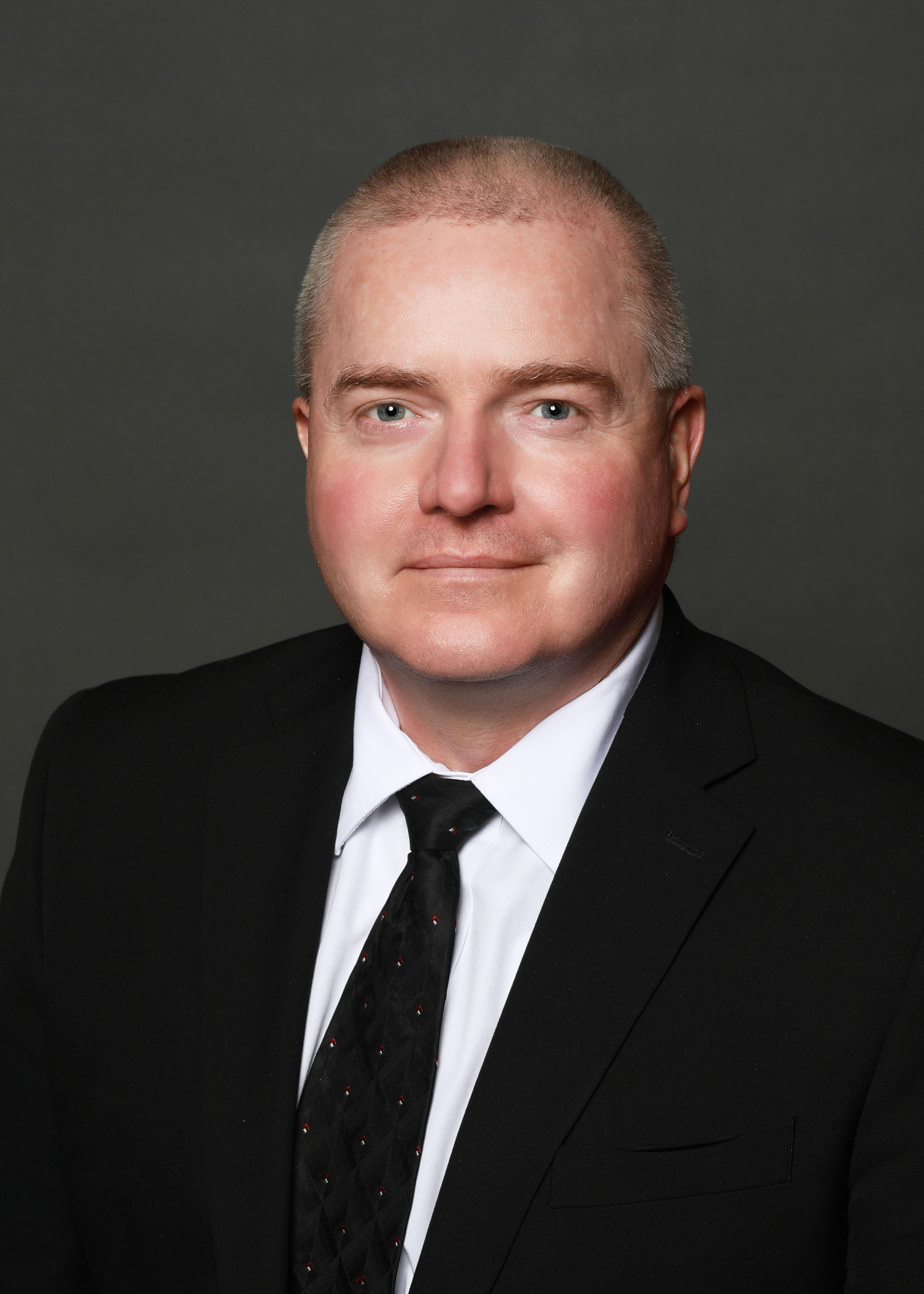

Member of the Iowa Senate from the 42nd district
- Incumbent
- Assumed office January 9, 2023
- Preceded by: Jeff Reichman

Member of the Iowa House of Representatives from the 95th district
- In office January 11, 2021 – January 8, 2023
- Preceded by: Louie Zumbach
- Succeeded by: Taylor Collins

Personal details
- Born: 1970 (age 55–56) Newton, Iowa, U.S.
- Party: Republican
- Spouse: Stacy Rozek
- Children: 2
- Education: University of Phoenix (BS); Liberty University

Military service
- Branch/service: United States Army
- Unit: Iowa Army National Guard

Charlie McClintock (born 1970) is an American politician serving as a member of the Iowa Senate for the 42nd district. Originally elected in November 2020 as a member of the Iowa House of Representatives from the 95th district, he assumed that office on January 11, 2021. In November 2022, he was elected to the state senate and assumed that position on January 9, 2023.

== Education ==
McClintock earned a Bachelor of Science degree in criminal justice administration from University of Phoenix and is a Master of Business Administration candidate at Liberty University.

== Army and law enforcement career ==
McClintock served in the Iowa Army National Guard for 21 years, retiring as a warrant officer. McClintock began his law enforcement career in 1990 as a Deputy Sheriff for Van Buren County before joining the Cedar Rapids Police Department as an officer.

In 1998, McClintock moved to the Joint Communications Agency for the City of Cedar Rapids. In 2004 he became the manager of the JCA, and currently serves in that position.

== Iowa House of Representatives ==
He was elected to the Iowa House of Representatives in the 2020 election and assumed office on January 11, 2021. He also serves as vice chair of the House Justice System Appropriations Subcommittee. In 2023, McClintock became an early primary endorser of Donald Trump's 2024 presidential campaign.
