= Chester R. Allen =

American Marine Corps Major General and Quartermaster General

Chester Robinson Allen
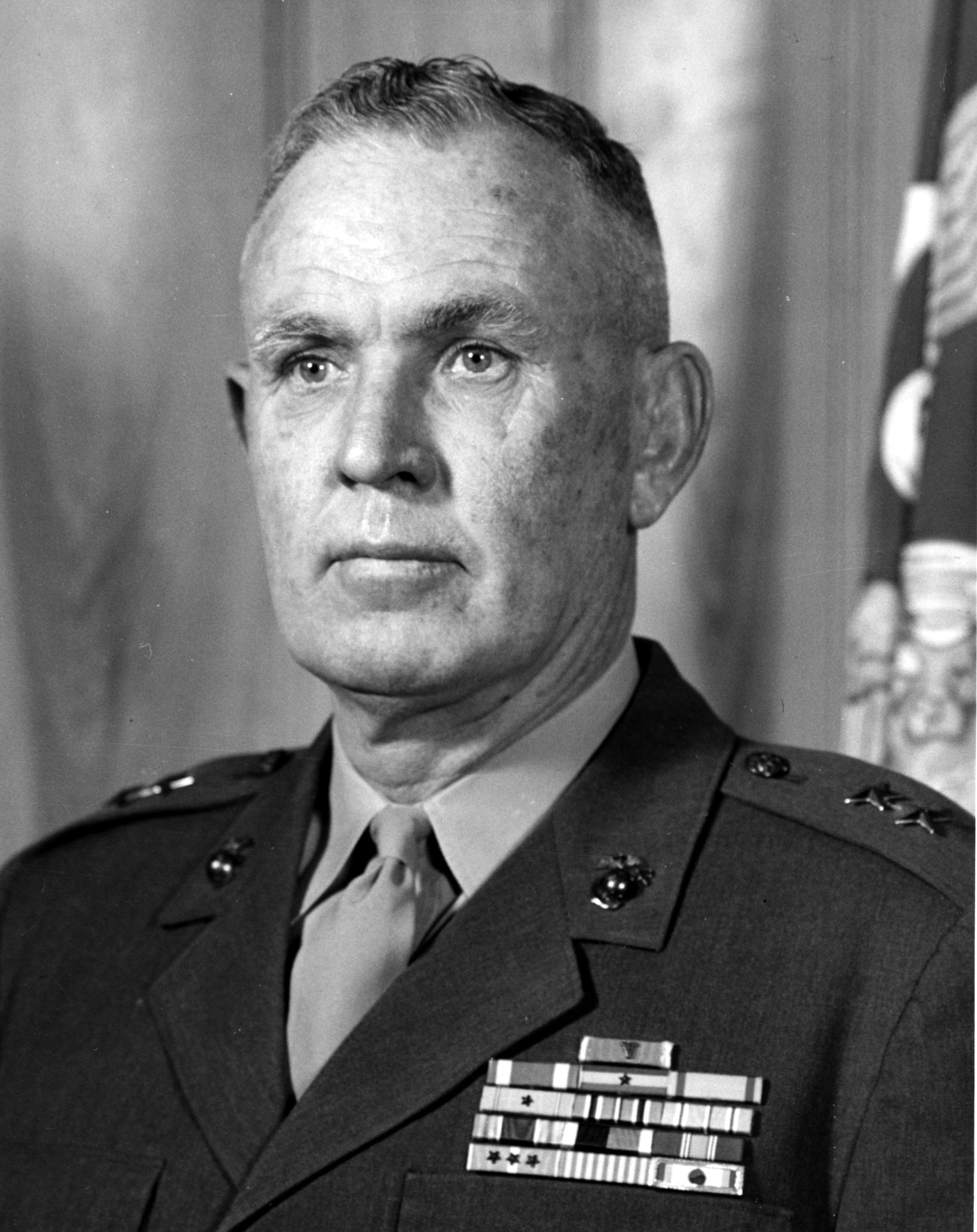
- MG Chester R. Allen, USMC
- Born: February 6, 1905; Somerville, Tennessee, US
- Died: April 10, 1972 (aged 67); Bethesda, Maryland, US
- Burial place: Arlington National Cemetery
- Military career
- Allegiance: United States
- Branch: United States Marine Corps
- Service years: 1929–1963
- Rank: Major general
- Service number: 0-4464
- Commands: Quartermaster General of the Marine Corps; Marine Supply Center Barstow
- Conflicts: Yangtze Patrol; World War II Korean War: Battle of the Punchbowl
- Awards: Legion of Merit; Navy Commendation Medal

Chester Robinson Allen (February 6, 1905 – April 10, 1972) was decorated officer of the United States Marine Corps with the rank of major general. He spent his career mostly in Quartermaster Department of the Marine Corps beginning in the field assignments, ultimately reaching the capacity of Quartermaster General of the Marine Corps. He held this office between dates January 1, 1960 – June 30, 1963.

== Early career ==
Chester R. Allen was born on February 6, 1905, in Somerville, Tennessee. But his family later moved to Florida, where he attended public schools in Auburndale and Lakeland. Allen then enrolled the University of Florida in Gainesville and graduated in June 1929 with bachelor's degree. While at University, he was a member of varsity football and boxing teams and also received army reserve commission as a member of Army Reserve Officers' Training Corps unit in May 1929. Allen was also a member of Sigma Lambda Tau social fraternity.

He resigned his reserve commission in order to be appointed second lieutenant in the Marine Corps on July 25, 1929, and as any other newly commissioned marine officer, he was ordered to the Basic School at Philadelphia Navy Yard for further officer training. While attending the Basic School, Allen was a tackle of All-Marine Corps football team. He completed the school in summer of 1930 and was ordered to the Marine Barracks Parris Island, South Carolina for garrison duty. While at Parris Island, Allen was again a member of All Marine Football team.

In June 1932, Allen was attached to the Marine detachment aboard the battleship USS Nevada and served with the Pacific Fleet until July 1934. While aboard that ship, Allen served simultaneously as Coach and player, USS Nevada football squad. He was subsequently attached to the Marine barracks at Bremerton Navy Yard, Washington and promoted to the rank of first lieutenant in March 1935. While in this capacity, Allen captained the Bremerton Marine Rifle and Pistol Team, which won the San Diego Trophy Match in March 1936.

Allen was ordered to the Marine Corps Schools, Quantico in August 1936 and attended Company Officers Course, which he completed in August 1937. He was subsequently promoted to the rank of captain and sailed to China as a member of 6th Marine Regiment. While in China, Allen was transferred to 4th Marine Regiment, 2nd Marine Brigade under Brigadier General John C. Beaumont in February 1938 and participated in guard duty at Shanghai International Settlement and later served with the Marine detachment at the American embassy in Peking in connection with Asiatic Division Rifle and Pistol Competitions as Officer-in-Charge, 4th Marines Rifle and Pistol Team.

== World War II ==
Upon his return to the United States in August 1940, Allen was stationed at Marine Corps Base San Diego, California and served under Major General William P. Upshur as Chief Range officer until the end of November 1941.

Following the Japanese attack on Pearl Harbor, Allen was promoted to the rank of major in January 1942 and ordered to the Marine Corps Recruit Depot Parris Island, South Carolina for duty as commanding officer, 2nd Barrage Balloon Squadron. After few months of training, he sailed with his squadron to Samoa in April 1942 and remained there as the part of Samoan Defense Force until the end of August of that year.

Allen then returned to the United States, was promoted to the rank of lieutenant colonel and served temporary duty at Headquarters Marine Corps in Washington, D.C., until February 1943, when he was attached to the Depot of Supplies, San Francisco under Brigadier General Arnold W. Jacobsen. He served as chief of the Ordnance Division there and received the Navy Commendation Medal for his meritorious service.

== Later service ==
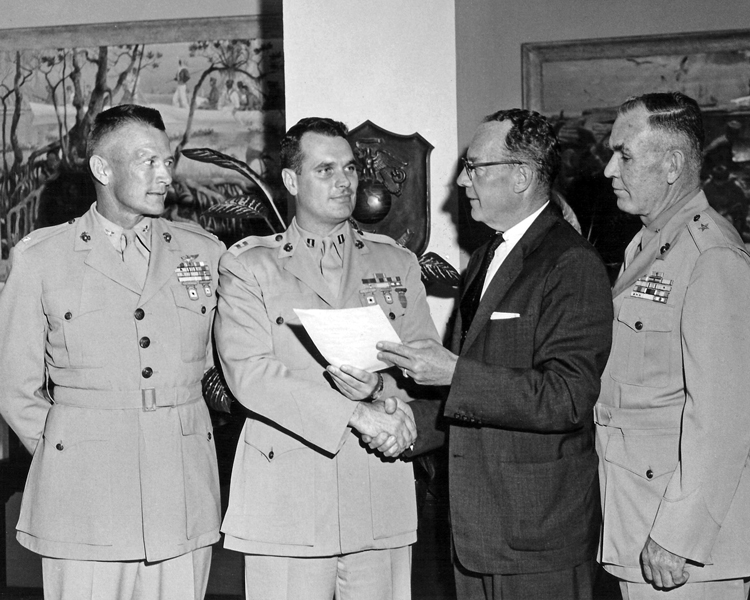
BG Allen (first from right) during the Letter of Appreciation presentation to William McMillan (second from left) for the International shooting match in Moscow, 1958. Others are Commandant Randolph M. Pate (in civil suit) and Colonel Robert D. Moser, Head of Marksmanship Training Branch, G-3, HQMC.

Allen was promoted to the rank of colonel in August 1945 and ordered back to the Pacific area. He served with 2nd Marine Division under Major General LeRoy P. Hunt during the occupation of Japan. Allen was transferred to Pearl Harbor in July 1946 and assumed duties as logistics officer, Service Command, Fleet Marine Force, Pacific.

In August 1947, Allen assumed command of Marine Corps Depot of Supplies Barstow, California and served in this capacity until he was ordered to Far East, during the ongoing Korean War in June 1951.

He joined 1st Marine Division under Major General Gerald C. Thomas and served as Divisional Supply Officer during the Battle of the Punchbowl in August–September 1951. He remained with the division until December of that year and received the Legion of Merit with Combat "V" for his service in Korea.

Allen returned to the United States in May 1952 and assumed duty as supply officer at Camp Pendleton under Major General Oliver P. Smith. He was transferred to the Headquarters Marine Corps in Washington, D.C., where he headed the Operations Branch of the Supply Department. Allen was promoted to the rank of brigadier general in February 1955 and assumed duties as executive officer of the Supply Department and head of the Supply Department.

He was appointed Assistant Quartermaster General of the Marine Corps and deputy to Quartermaster Major generals Ion M. Bethel and Roy M. Gulick in September 1957 and was co-responsible for the support of development, production, acquisition, and sustainment of general supply, Mortuary Affairs, subsistences, petroleum and water, material and distribution management during peace and war to provide combat power to the U.S. Marine Corps units.

Allen was named director, Marksmanship Training Division at Headquarters Marine Corps in March 1959 and resumed his former post as Assistant Quartermaster General of the Marine Corps in September of that year. He finally succeeded Roy M. Gulick as Quartermaster General of the Marine Corps on January 1, 1960, and served in this capacity until June 30, 1963, when he retired from the Marine Corps after 34 years of active service.

== Retirement ==
Following his retirement, Allen returned to Auburndale, Florida, and worked as member, executive committee of Armed Forces Management Association and member and honorary national president, Defense Supply Association. He was also active in his alma mater's institutions and worked as Executive Council, Alumni Association, University of Florida and was awarded with honorary membership, Florida Blue Key Society and also received University's Distinguished Alumni Award in 1961.

Major General Chester A. Allen died on April 10, 1972, in Naval Hospital in Bethesda, Maryland, following a brief illness. He is buried at Arlington National Cemetery, Virginia, together with his wife, Faith Elizabeth Watson Allen.

== Decorations ==
Here is the ribbon bar of Major General Chester R. Allen:

1st Row	Legion of Merit with Combat "V"		
2nd Row	Navy Commendation Medal	Navy Presidential Unit Citation with one star	China Service Medal
3rd Row	American Defense Service Medal with Base Clasp	American Campaign Medal	Asiatic-Pacific Campaign Medal
4th Row	World War II Victory Medal	Navy Occupation Service Medal	National Defense Service Medal with one star
5th Row	Korean Service Medal with three 3/16 inch service stars	United Nations Korea Medal	Republic of Korea Presidential Unit Citation

Military offices
Preceded by Roy M. Gulick	Quartermaster General of the Marine Corps; January 1, 1960 - June 30, 1963	Succeeded by William P. Battell
