= Bud McLearn =

Vernon E. "Bud" McLearn (September 11, 1933 – April 7, 1999) was an American high school basketball coach. Most notably the head coach for the Bullettes of Mediapolis High School (Mediapolis, Iowa) girls six-on-six basketball team from 1959 to 1987.

== Early life ==
McLearn was born in Montrose, Iowa, to Ed and Mary Cale McLearn. He graduated from Montrose High School in 1951, where he was senior class president, and then from Iowa Wesleyan College in Mount Pleasant in 1955, with a Bachelor of Arts degree. He served two years in the United States Army and did graduate study work at Western Illinois University in 1957.

== Coaching ==
He began coaching in 1957 at Oakville High School (Oakville, Iowa) and after two seasons became the head coach at Mediapolis High School (1959-1960 season). In 28 seasons he had a career coaching record of 706 wins and 80 losses (an 89.8 winning percentage). During his 26-year tenure at Mediapolis the girls team went 333-8 (97.6 percent) on their home court. This run included consecutive home winning streaks of 97, 84, and 66 games. McLearn's teams qualified for the Iowa state tournament 21 years out of the 28 (including a stretch of 12-straight appearances), with two state championships, a 51-35 victory over South Hamilton (Hamilton County) in 1967 and a 68-51 win over Adel in 1973. He retired in 1987 with the fourth best record in Iowa state basketball history. McLearn and Mediapolis lost to Van Horne High School, 62-59, in the 1962 state tournament final (Van Horne's Mickey Schallau scored 37 of the team's 62 points).

McLearn was inducted into the Iowa Girls Coaches Association Hall of Fame in 1988, and after dying of cancer in 1999, was posthumously inducted into the National High School Athletic Coaches Association Hall of Fame in 2000. The high school gymnasium at Mediapolis was named McLearn Court in his honor in 2001.

== Outside coaching ==
McLearn taught math at Mediapolis and also had a Mississippi River commercial fishing operation with his wife, Joyce (née Wehde), whom he married April 17, 1955 in Tipton.

He is buried at the Montrose Cemetery, a block away from his childhood home.
