= Wendell Pellett =

American politician (1917–1996)

Member of the Iowa House of Representatives from the 97th district
- In office January 10, 1983 – January 13, 1991
- Preceded by: William H. Harbor
- Succeeded by: Richard B. Weidman

Member of the Iowa House of Representatives from the 95th district
- In office January 8, 1973 – January 9, 1983
- Preceded by: Perry L. Christensen
- Succeeded by: James O. Anderson

Member of the Iowa House of Representatives from the 83rd district
- In office January 11, 1971 – January 7, 1973
- Preceded by: Lester M. Freeman
- Succeeded by: Charles F. Strothman

Personal details
- Born: March 15, 1917 Atlantic, Iowa
- Died: January 9, 1996 (aged 78) Des Moines, Iowa
- Party: Republican

Wendell Pellett (March 15, 1917 – January 9, 1996) was an American politician who served in the Iowa House of Representatives from 1971 to 1991.

He died on January 9, 1996, in Des Moines, Iowa at age 78.
