= Archie E. O'Neil =

U.S. Marine Corps Brigadier General

Archie Edward O'Neil
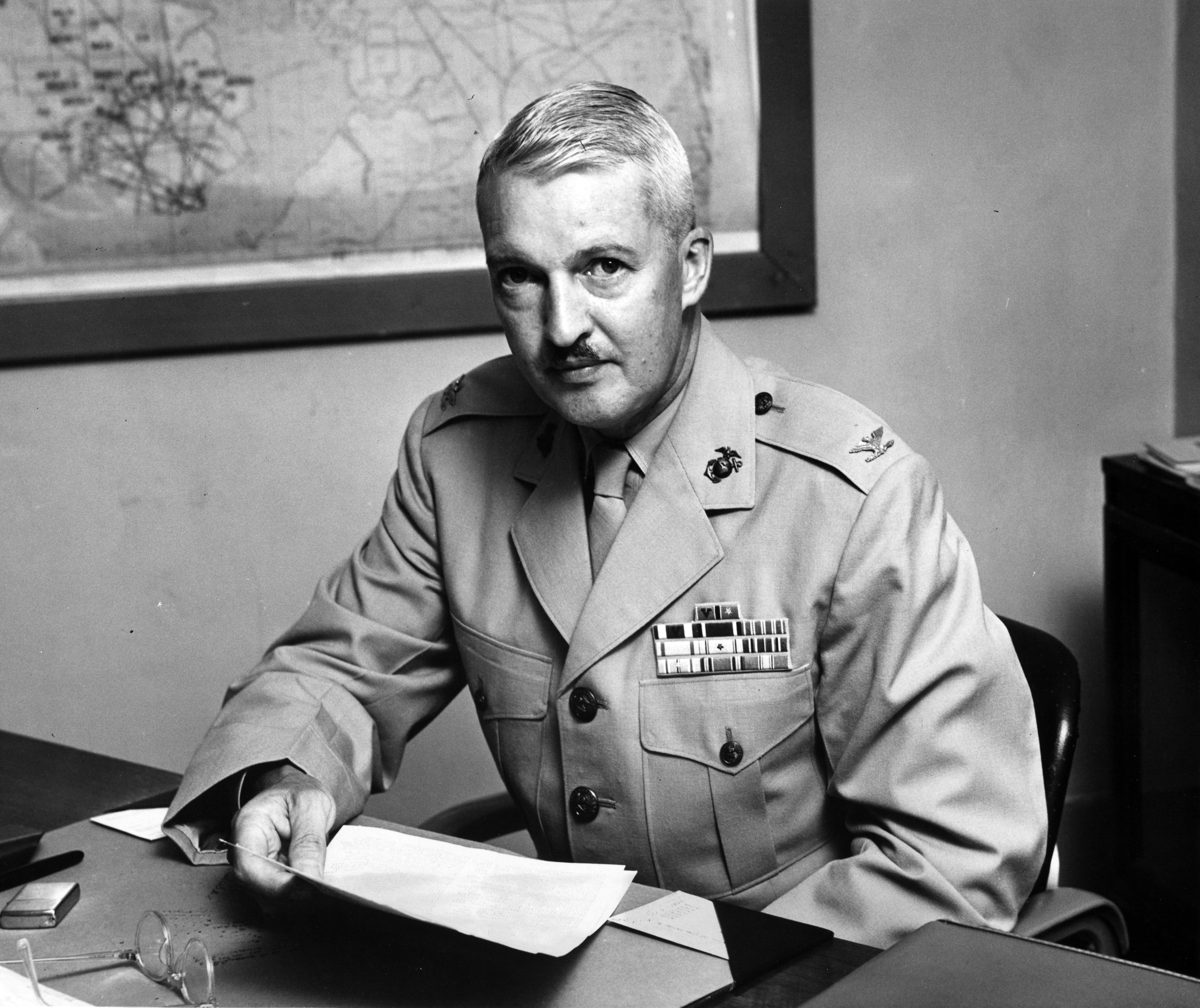
- O'Neil as Colonel, USMC
- Born: August 22, 1905; Williamson, West Virginia, US
- Died: January 16, 1986 (aged 80); Columbia, South Carolina, US
- Military career
- Allegiance: United States
- Branch: United States Marine Corps
- Service years: 1927–1957
- Rank: Brigadier general
- Commands: 9th Defense Battalion
- Conflicts: Nicaraguan Campaign; Yangtze Patrol; World War II: Battle of Midway; Guadalcanal Campaign; Solomon Islands Campaign; New Georgia Campaign; Recapture of Guam
- Awards: Bronze Star Medal (2); Navy Commendation Medal

Archie Edward O'Neil (August 22, 1905 – January 16, 1986) was an officer in the United States Marine Corps with the rank of Brigadier general. He is most noted for his service as Commanding officer, 9th Defense Battalion during the Recapture of Guam in July 1944.

== Early career ==
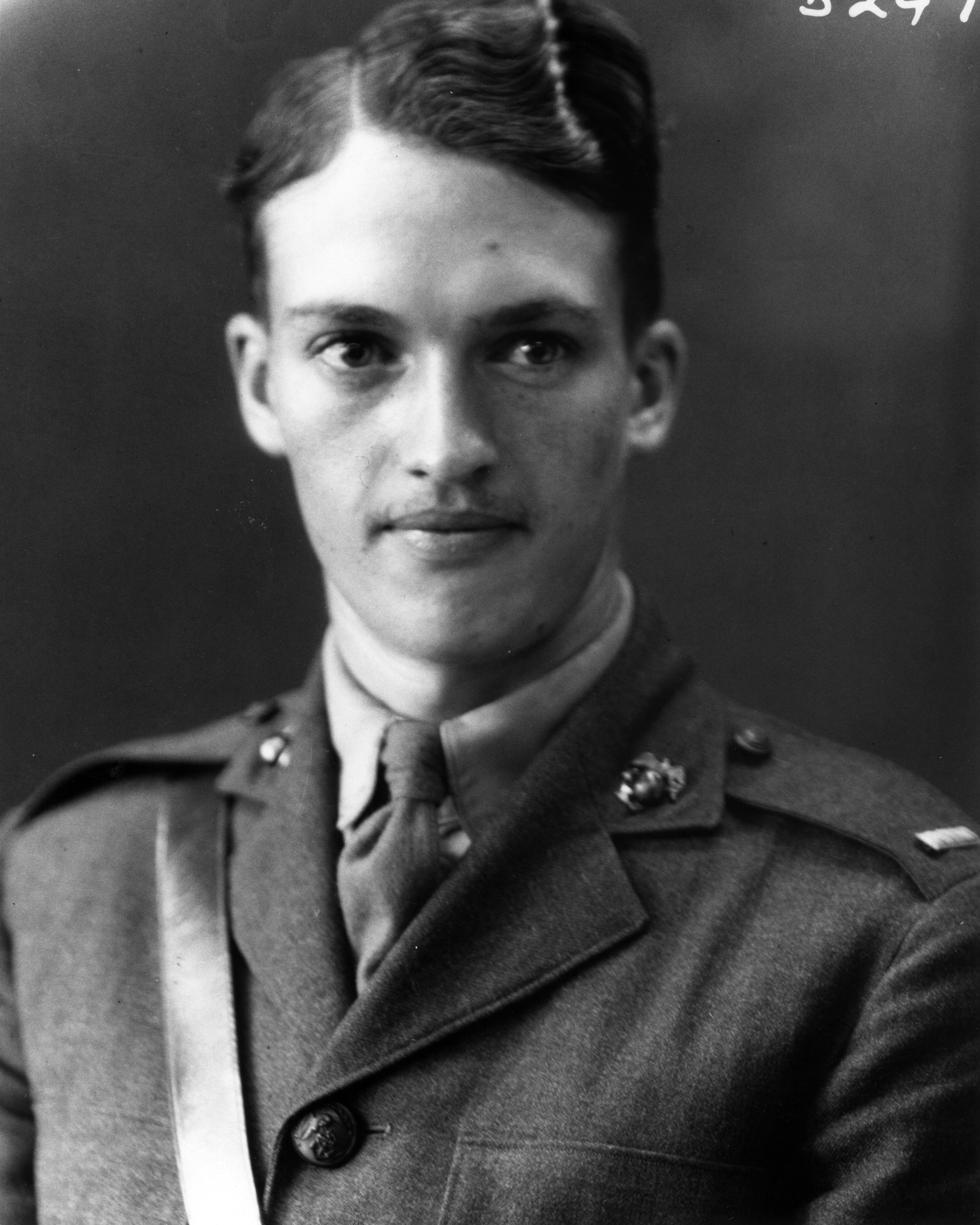
O'Neil as 2nd lieutenant, USMC, in November 1927

O'Neil was born on August 22, 1905, in Williamson, West Virginia, the son of Edward S. and Louella Mae Myers O'Neil. He attended the public school and high school in Williamson, before received an appointment to the United States Naval Academy at Annapolis, Maryland, in May 1923. During his time at the Academy, he was nicknamed "Peggy" and ultimately graduated with Bachelor of Science degree on June 2, 1927.

Among his classmates were several later general officers including: George W. Anderson, Jr., Glynn R. Donaho, John C. Munn, Herbert D. Riley, Alan Shapley, John Thach, Clarence E. Coffin, Samuel H. Crittenden Jr., Marion L. Dawson, Timothy F. Donohue, Thomas J. Hamilton, Herbert L. Hoerner, William P. Chilton, Alexander M. Kowalzyk, William L. Knickerbocker, Leland R. Lampman, William H. Leahy, William F. Royall, Willard A. Saunders, Brooke Schumm, Francis M. McAlister, David F. O'Neill, Henry R. Paige, Samuel S. Jack, Jack P. Juhan, Walter L. J. Bayler, Joseph W. Earnshaw, Harold D. Hansen, George H. Potter, Richard P. Ross Jr., Miles S. Newton and Earl S. Piper.

He was commissioned second lieutenant in the Marine Corps and ordered to the Basic School at Philadelphia Navy Yard for basic officer training, which he completed in January 1928. O'Neil then joined 2nd Brigade of Marines under Logan Feland and embarked for Nicaragua, where he participated in the jungle patrols against armed bandits under Augusto César Sandino until July 1929. He was subsequently ordered back to the United States and joined the Marine Barracks at Naval Air Station Pensacola, Florida.

In May 1930, O'Neil was transferred to the Marine Barracks, Parris Island, South Carolina and remained there until the end of December 1931, when he joined Marine Detachment aboard the battleship USS Wyoming. While aboard of Wyoming, O'Neil was promoted to first lieutenant on November 1, 1933, and participated in the training cruises for midshipmen and NROTC cadets to various destinations, including European ports, the Caribbean, and the Gulf of Mexico.

O'Neil returned to Marine Barracks, Parris Island, South Carolina in May 1934 and served in that post until August 1935, when he was sent to the Marine Corps Schools, Quantico, where he entered the Base Defense Weapons Course. Upon completion of the course, he was promoted to captain on June 30, 1936, and joined the 1st Marine Brigade under Brigadier general James J. Meade at Quantico.

After one year at Quantico, O'Neil was ordered to China, where he joined 4th Marine Regiment in Shanghai. He served in that assignment during the period of tensions between China and Japan and was present during the outbreak of the full scale invasion of China in the Second Sino-Japanese War in July 1937. O'Neil served in China until June 1938, when he assumed command of Marine Detachment aboard the cruiser USS Augusta, patrolling off the coast of China.

He was attached to the Marine Barracks, U.S. Naval Base Subic Bay near Olongapo, Philippines in June 1939 and remained there for next two years. While in this capacity, O'Neil completed Naval War College correspondence course in International Law.

== World War II ==
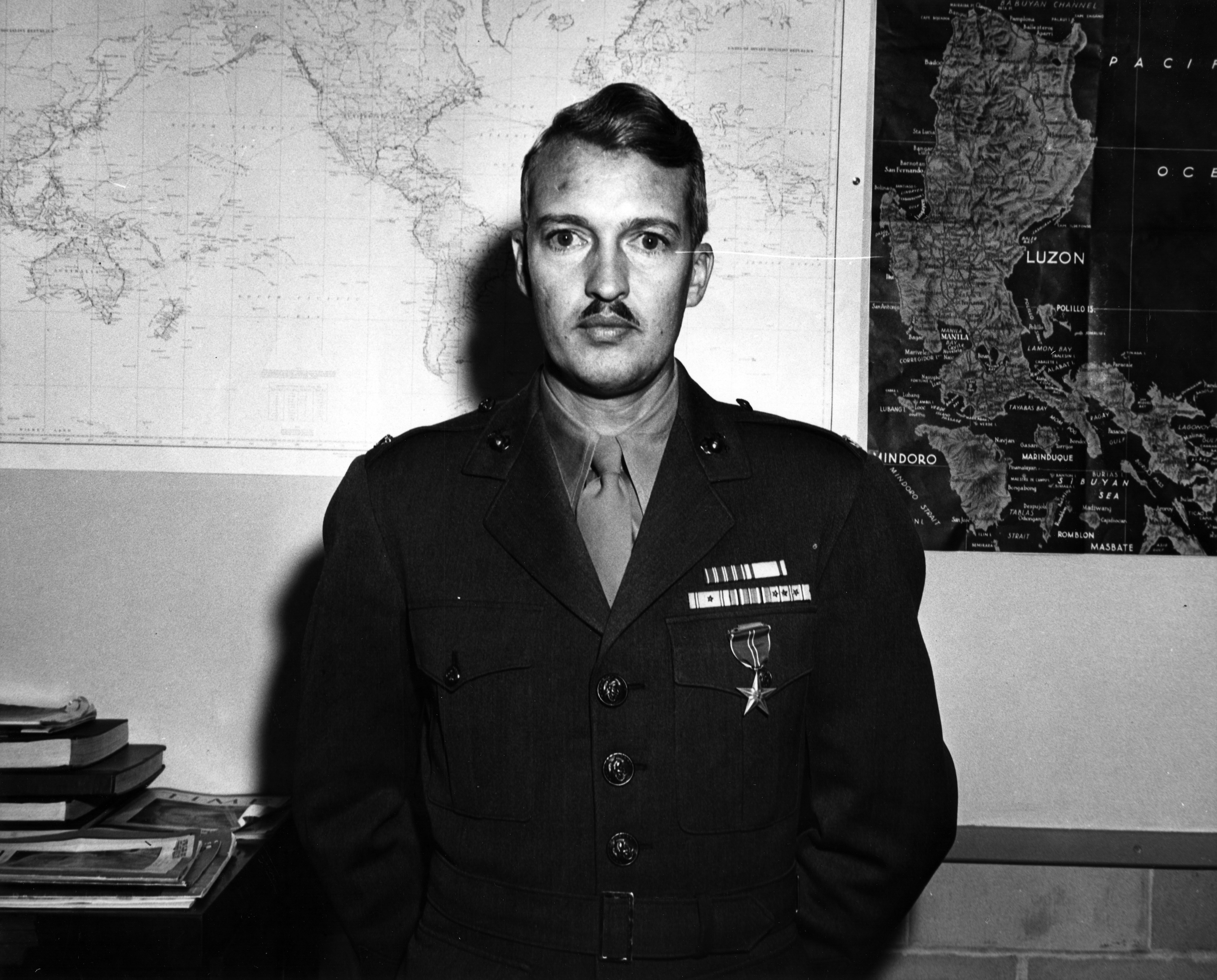
O'Neil after he was awarded the Bronze Star Medal in February 1945.

O'Neil returned to the United States in early 1941 and joined the newly established 6th Defense Battalion under lieutenant colonel Charles I. Murray in San Diego, California. Following his promotion to major on July 1, 1941, he was appointed battalion's executive officer and embarked for Hawaii, where remained until September that year, when 6th Defense Battalion was ordered to Midway Atoll.

Following the United States entry into World War II, O'Neil participated in the defense of the atoll against possible Japanese attack, which really took place between June 4–7, 1942. For his part in the Midway battle, O'Neil was decorated with Bronze Star Medal with Combat "V". He was also promoted to the temporary rank of lieutenant colonel on August 7, 1942.

O'Neil was subsequently transferred to 9th Defense Battalion under Colonel David R. Nimmer and participated in the Guadalcanal campaign, where he served as Group Commander, 155mm Gun Group, designated for naval artillery fire. The battalion was later ordered to take part in the New Georgia campaign under Colonel William J. Scheyer in summer 1943 and O'Neil commanded his group during the Landings on Rendova and the Battle of Munda Point. For his service at New Georgia, O'Neil received Navy Commendation Medal with Combat "V".

He was appointed acting Executive officer of 9th Defense Battalion at the beginning of August 1943 and held that command for one month, when he assumed command of the battalion. O'Neil was promoted to colonel on September 30, 1943, and led his unit during the Recapture of Guam in July–August 1944. He received his second Bronze Star Medal with Combat "V" and Navy Unit Commendation for his service at Guam.

O'Neil was ordered back to the United States in September 1944 and joined the headquarters, Marine Corps Base San Diego, California, where he remained under the command of Major general Archie F. Howard for the rest of the War.

== Postwar service ==
Following the War, O'Neil remained in the Marine Corps and served as commanding officer of the Marine Barracks at Mare Island Navy Yard, California, and Commanding officer, 1st Infantry Training Regiment at Camp Lejeune, North Carolina. While in the latter capacity, he was responsible for the training of replacement personnel following the Korean War. O'Neil retired from the active duty on July 1, 1957, after 30 years of commissioned service and was advanced to the rank of Brigadier general for having been specially commended in combat.

O'Neil was active in the Retired Officers Association following his retirement from the military and died in Columbia, South Carolina, on January 16, 1986, aged 80. O'Neil was buried at Greenlawn Memorial Cemetery in Columbia with his second wife, Lois Dorothy Jeter O'Neil (1916-2010). His first wife, Evelyn Pundita Rowell O'Neil (1901-1942), is buried in Beaufort, South Carolina. He had three sons from second marriage: Jeffrey, Jack and James.

== Decorations ==
Here is the ribbon bar of Brigadier General O'Neil:

1st Row	Bronze Star Medal with Combat "V" and one 5/16" Gold Star		
2nd Row	Navy Commendation Medal with Combat "V"	Navy Unit Commendation	Second Nicaraguan Campaign Medal
3rd Row	China Service Medal	American Defense Service Medal with Base Clasp	American Campaign Medal
4th Row	Asiatic-Pacific Campaign Medal with one silver 3/16 inch service star	World War II Victory Medal	National Defense Service Medal

== See also ==
- Marine defense battalions
- Battle of Guam (1944)

Military offices
Preceded by William J. Scheyer	Commanding Officer, 9th Defense Battalion; May 15, 1943 - August 12, 1943	Succeeded by Unit redesignated
