= Quentin Stanerson =

American politician (born 1977)

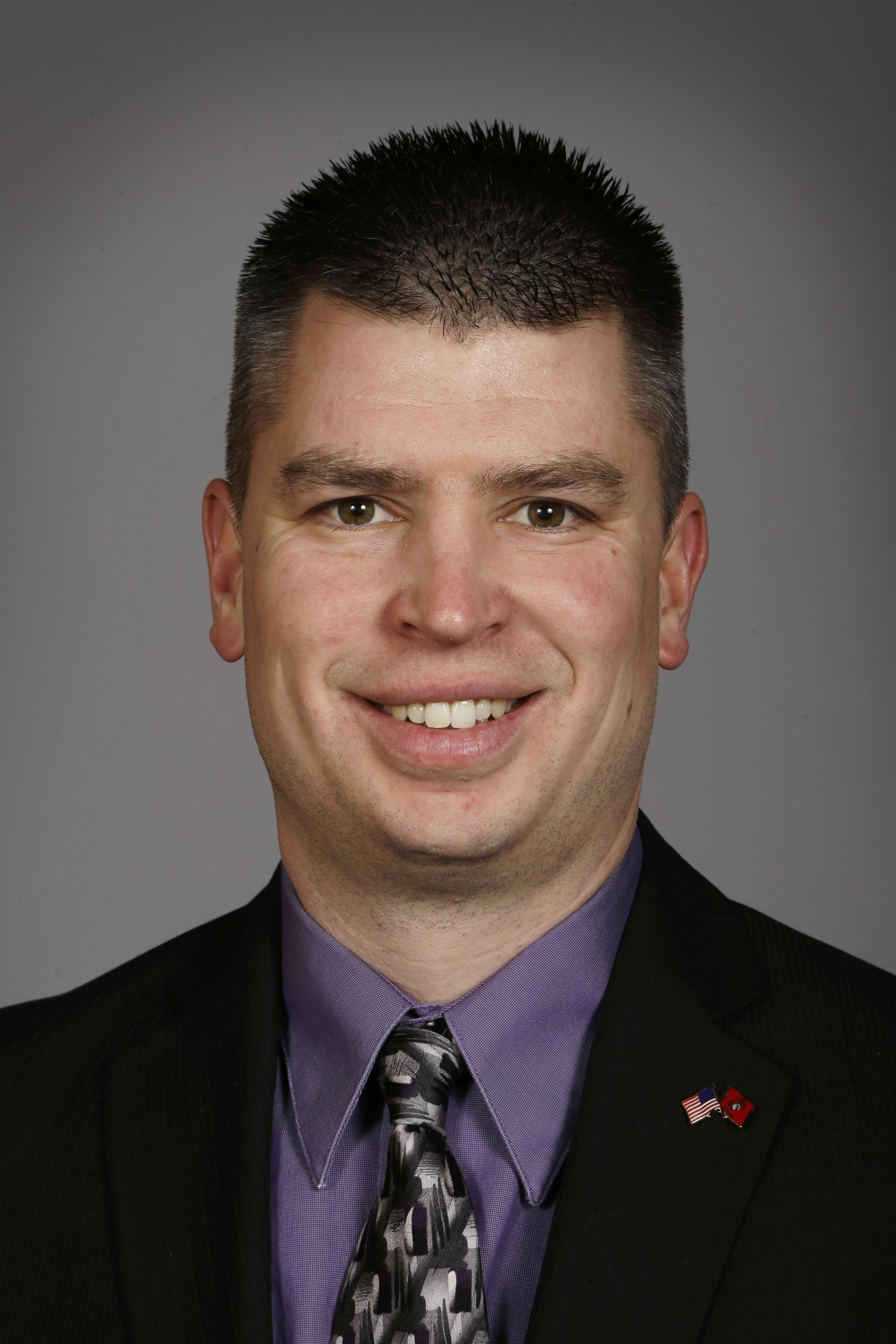
- Stanerson in 2013

Member of the Iowa House of Representatives from the 95th district
- In office January 14, 2013 – January 8, 2017
- Preceded by: Joel Fry (redistricting)
- Succeeded by: Louie Zumbach

Personal details
- Born: 1977 (age 48–49) Conroy, Iowa, U.S.
- Party: Republican
- Spouse: Nikki
- Children: 3
- Education: Kirkwood Community College (AA); Coe College (BA); Grand Canyon University (MS)
- Occupation: Teacher

Quentin Stanerson (born 1977) is an American teacher and retired politician who represented the 95th district of the Iowa House of Representatives from 2013 to 2017, which at the time consisted of much of northern and eastern Linn County, as well as parts of southeastern Buchanan County. He is a member of the Republican Party.

== Early life ==
Stanerson was born in 1977 in Conroy, Iowa, where he was raised. He graduated from Williamsburg High School. Following his graduation, he enlisted in the United States Marine Corps, where he served four years, and was deployed overseas multiple times.

After leaving the Marine Corps, Stanerson attended Kirkwood Community College, where he received an Associate of Arts. He then a received a Bachelor of Arts in history from Coe College, and a master's degree in education administration from Grand Canyon University.

== Political career ==
Stanerson announced his candidacy for the open 95th district of the Iowa House of Representatives following decennial redistricting in 2011. He won the Republican primaries unopposed on June 5, 2012, and defeated Democratic candidate Kristin Keast in the general on November 6, 2012, by 200 votes. He was subsequently appointed to the Local Government, State Government, Veterans Affairs, Ways and Means, and Education committees, the lattermost of which he was made vice chairman.

Stanerson announced his bid for reelection in early 2014. He won the Republican primaries unopposed on June 3, 2014, and again faced Democratic candidate Kristin Keast in the general election on November 4, whom he defeated by almost 2,000 votes. He was subsequently appointed chairman of the Veterans Affairs Committee.

Stanerson endorsed Marco Rubio for president in 2016. He declined to run for a third term.

== Personal life ==
Stanerson has a wife, Nikki, and three children. He has lived in Audubon, Iowa, since 2019, having previously resided in Center Point, Iowa.

Stanerson taught middle and high school social studies at North Linn Community School District from 2004 to 2019, and also coached middle school wrestling and track. He served as principal of Audubon Middle-High School from 2019 to 2026.

== Electoral history ==
* = incumbent

Election	Political result	Candidate	Party	Votes	%
Iowa House of Representatives Republican primary elections, 2012; District 95; Turnout: 675	Republican (newly redistricted)	Quentin Stanerson	Republican	672	99.6
Iowa House of Representatives Republican primary elections, 2012; District 95; Turnout: 675	Republican (newly redistricted)	Other/Write-in votes		3	0.4
Iowa House of Representatives general elections, 2012; District 95; Turnout: 16,798	Republican (newly redistricted)	Quentin Stanerson	Republican	8,494	50.6
Iowa House of Representatives general elections, 2012; District 95; Turnout: 16,798	Republican (newly redistricted)	Kristin Keast	Democratic	8,294	49.4
Iowa House of Representatives general elections, 2012; District 95; Turnout: 16,798	Republican (newly redistricted)	Other/Write-in votes		10	0.06
Iowa House of Representatives Republican primary elections, 2014; District 95; Turnout: 1,203	Republican	Quentin Stanerson*	Republican	1,199	99.7
Iowa House of Representatives Republican primary elections, 2014; District 95; Turnout: 1,203	Republican	Other/Write-in votes		4	0.3
Iowa House of Representatives general elections, 2014; District 95; Turnout: 13,376	Republican	Quentin Stanerson*	Republican	7,624	57
Iowa House of Representatives general elections, 2014; District 95; Turnout: 13,376	Republican	Kristin Keast	Democratic	5,737	42.9
Iowa House of Representatives general elections, 2014; District 95; Turnout: 13,376	Republican	Other/Write-in votes		15	0.1
