= William P. Battell =

U.S. Marine Corps Major General and Quartermaster General

William Putnam Battell
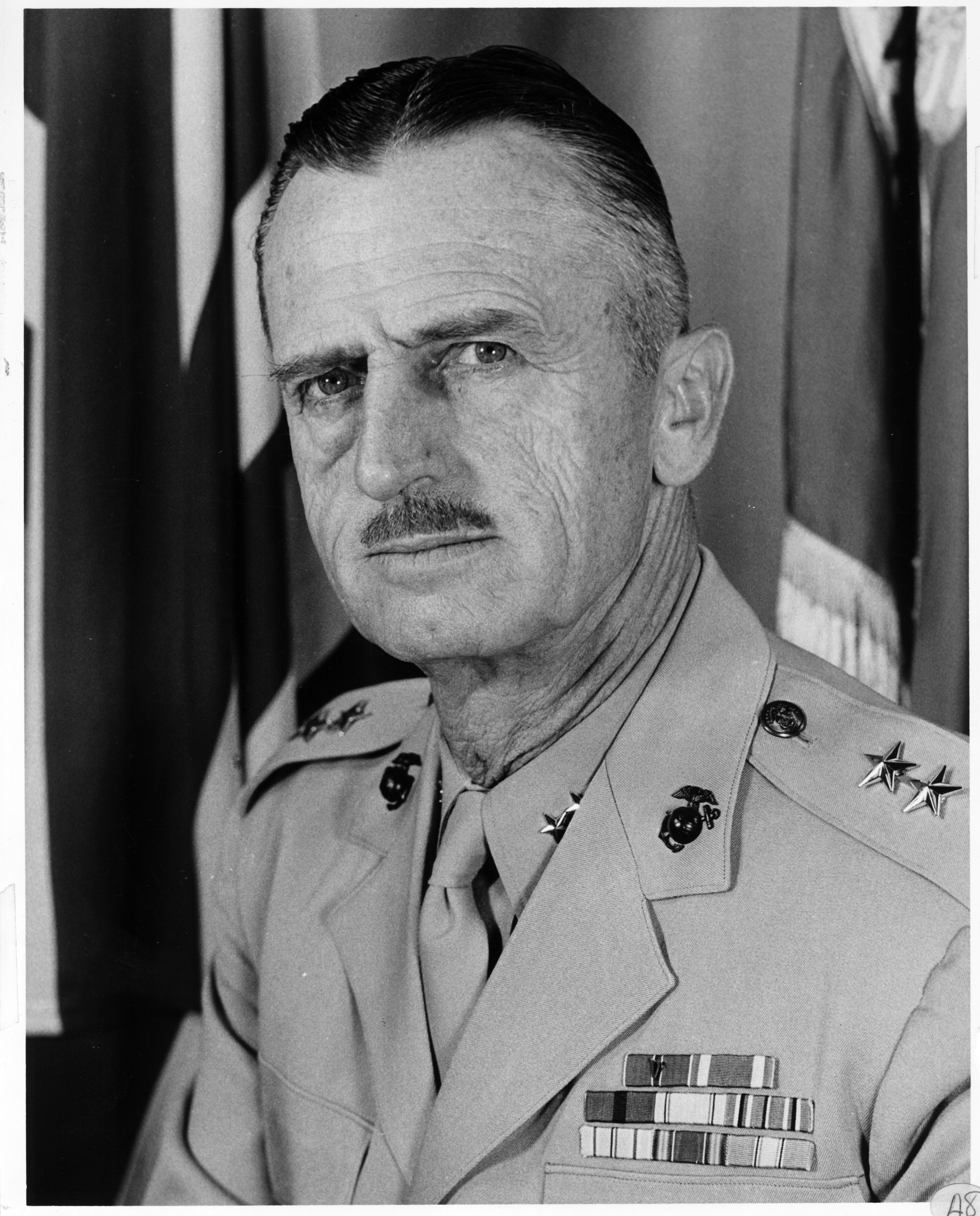
- MG William P. Battell, USMC
- Born: December 26, 1906; Mediapolis, Iowa, US
- Died: July 20, 1980 (aged 73); Ruskin, Florida, US
- Burial place: Ruskin Memorial Park, Florida
- Military career
- Allegiance: United States
- Branch: United States Marine Corps
- Service years: 1927–1965
- Rank: Major general
- Service number: 0-4486
- Commands: Quartermaster General of the Marine Corps; Marine Supply Center Albany
- Conflicts: World War II: Palau Islands Campaign
- Awards: Bronze Star Medal; Navy Commendation Medal

William Putnam Battell (December 26, 1906 – July 20, 1980) was a mustang officer in the United States Marine Corps, who is most noted for his service as Quartermaster General of the Marine Corps between dates July 1, 1963 – March 1, 1965. He began his career as enlisted man and was commissioned later. During World War II, Battell served as Signal Supply Officer in the Pacific theater and was decorated for bravery.

== Early career ==
Battell was born on December 26, 1906, in Mediapolis, Iowa, as the son of Frederic Louis and Harriet Chapman Battell. His father served as freight auditor and postal inspector in Des Moines County, and young William attended high school in Ames, Iowa. Also both his grandfathers were Civil war veterans – paternal Louis T. Battell served as captain and commander of Company D, 24th Wisconsin Volunteer Infantry and maternal, Samuel M. Chapman, served with 1st Iowa Volunteer Infantry and participated in the Battle of Wilson's Creek.

Upon the graduation in summer of 1924, he remained in Ames and entered the Iowa State College there. However, college studies did not satisfy him, and Battell left the college in April 1927 in order to enter Marine Corps Service.

He subsequently enlisted the Marine Corps as private on April 15, 1927, and following the boot camp, Battell was sent to the Naval Radio Material School at Anacostia for instruction. Upon the completion of the school, he was appointed an instructor and his daily classwork consisted of memorizing the wiring diagrams of every radio set then used by the navy.

Battell served in this capacity until June 1929, reached the rank of sergeant and received Marine Corps Good Conduct Medal for his exemplary behavior and efficiency. He was also selected for the Officer Candidates School at Quantico, Virginia, and graduated from the Meritorious Commissioning Program on January 31, 1930, as second lieutenant in the Marine Corps.

He then served for brief period at Marine Barracks, Norfolk Navy Yard, before he was sent to the Basic School at Philadelphia Navy Yard in August 1930 for further officer training. He completed the school in June 1931 and was attached to the Marine barracks at Washington Navy Yard. Battell sailed for China in May 1932 and served with the Marine detachment in Peking until November of that year.

Battell was then stationed at Mare Island Navy Yard until July 1933, when he was attached to the Marine detachment aboard the aircraft carrier USS Saratoga and participated in the Fleet Problem XV in the Gulf of Panama and the Caribbean in April–May 1934.

He was transferred to the Marine Corps Base San Diego in July 1934 and then to Marine Corps Base Quantico upon his promotion to first lieutenant in January 1935. Battell attended the Army Signal School at Fort Monmouth, New Jersey, and completed the ten-month course in June 1936. He then served as an instructor at the Basic School until July 1937, when he was promoted to the rank of captain and ordered back to Quantico.

Battell was ordered for another tour of sea duties in May 1938, when he was appointed commanding officer of the Marine detachment aboard the battleship USS Arkansas and participated in the patrol cruises in the western Atlantic until July 1939, when he was ordered to the Marine Corps Depot of Supplies, Philadelphia.

== World War II ==
Battell served in Philadelphia under Brigadier General Maurice C. Gregory as signal supply officer until September 1941, when he was transferred to Washington, D.C., for service with the Navy Department. He was attached to the Radio Division, Bureau of Ships as head of the Marine Corps Installation and Maintenance Group. While in this capacity Battell served under Rear Admiral Edward L. Cochrane and was responsible for satisfying the signal supply needs of the Fleet Marine Force.

He was promoted to major in January 1942 and to lieutenant colonel in August of that year. Battell was decorated with Navy Commendation Medal for his at Navy Department and sailed for duty in Pacific area in February 1944 and was attached to the Headquarters Marine, Fleet Marine Force, Pacific at Pearl Harbor as signal supply officer, Service Command, under Brigadier General Earl C. Long.

While in this capacity, Battell took part in the several inspection tours in combat areas and directed his subordinate units during the support of Palau Islands Campaign and Iwo Jima Operation. For his service in the Pacific, he was decorated with the Bronze Star Medal with Combat "V".

== Later service ==
Battell returned to the United States in October 1946 and was attached to the Depot of Supplies, San Francisco, under Brigadier General Arnold W. Jacobsen. He was promoted to the rank of colonel in March 1948 and left San Francisco in August 1951 in order to attend the Naval War College in Newport, Rhode Island.

He completed the instruction in June 1952 and assumed duty as supply officer at the staff of Marine Corps Schools, Quantico, under Lieutenant General Clifton B. Cates. In October 1954, Battell moved to the Camp Pendleton, California, and served as base supply officer under Major General John T. Selden until December 1955.

Battell then sailed for Japan and assumed duty as commanding officer, 3rd Service Regiment, 3rd Marine Division under Major General Thomas A. Wornham. His regiment consisted of engineer company, signal company, military police company, ordnance company, supply company, transport company and several Marine ammo companies and Battell was responsible for division's daily running.

He left Japan in December 1956 and assumed duty as director, Material Division, Supply Department at Headquarters Marine Corps. For his new capacity, Battell was promoted to the rank of brigadier general in January 1957. He assumed command of Marine Corps Supply Center Albany, Georgia in July 1958 and held this command until the beginning of September 1962. Shortly before the end of his tour at Albany, Battell was promoted to the rank of major general.

Battell was then attached back to Headquarters Marine Corps and served as assistant quartermaster general and deputy to Major General Chester R. Allen. He succeeded Allen as Quartermaster General of the Marine Corps in July 1963 and was responsible for the support of development, production, acquisition, and sustainment of general supply, Mortuary Affairs, subsistences, petroleum and water, material and distribution management during peace and war to provide combat power to the U.S. Marine Corps units.

== Retirement ==
He retired from active service on March 1, 1965, and settled in Ruskin, Florida. Major General William P. Battell died on July 20, 1980, after a long illness in Ruskin and is buried together with his wife, Esther L. Martin Battell.

== Decorations ==
Here is the ribbon bar of Major General William P. Battell:

1st Row	Bronze Star Medal with Combat "V"		Navy Commendation Medal
2nd Row	Marine Corps Good Conduct Medal	American Defense Service Medal	American Campaign Medal
3rd Row	Asiatic-Pacific Campaign Medal	World War II Victory Medal	National Defense Service Medal with one star

Military offices
Preceded by Chester R. Allen	Quartermaster General of the Marine Corps; July 1, 1963 - March 1, 1965	Succeeded by Paul R. Tyler
Preceded by Roy M. Gulick	Commanding General of the Marine Corps Supply Center Albany; July 1, 1958 - September 1, 1962	Succeeded by Joseph O. Butcher
