= Roy M. Gulick =

American Marine Corps Quartermaster General

Roy Moyer Gulick
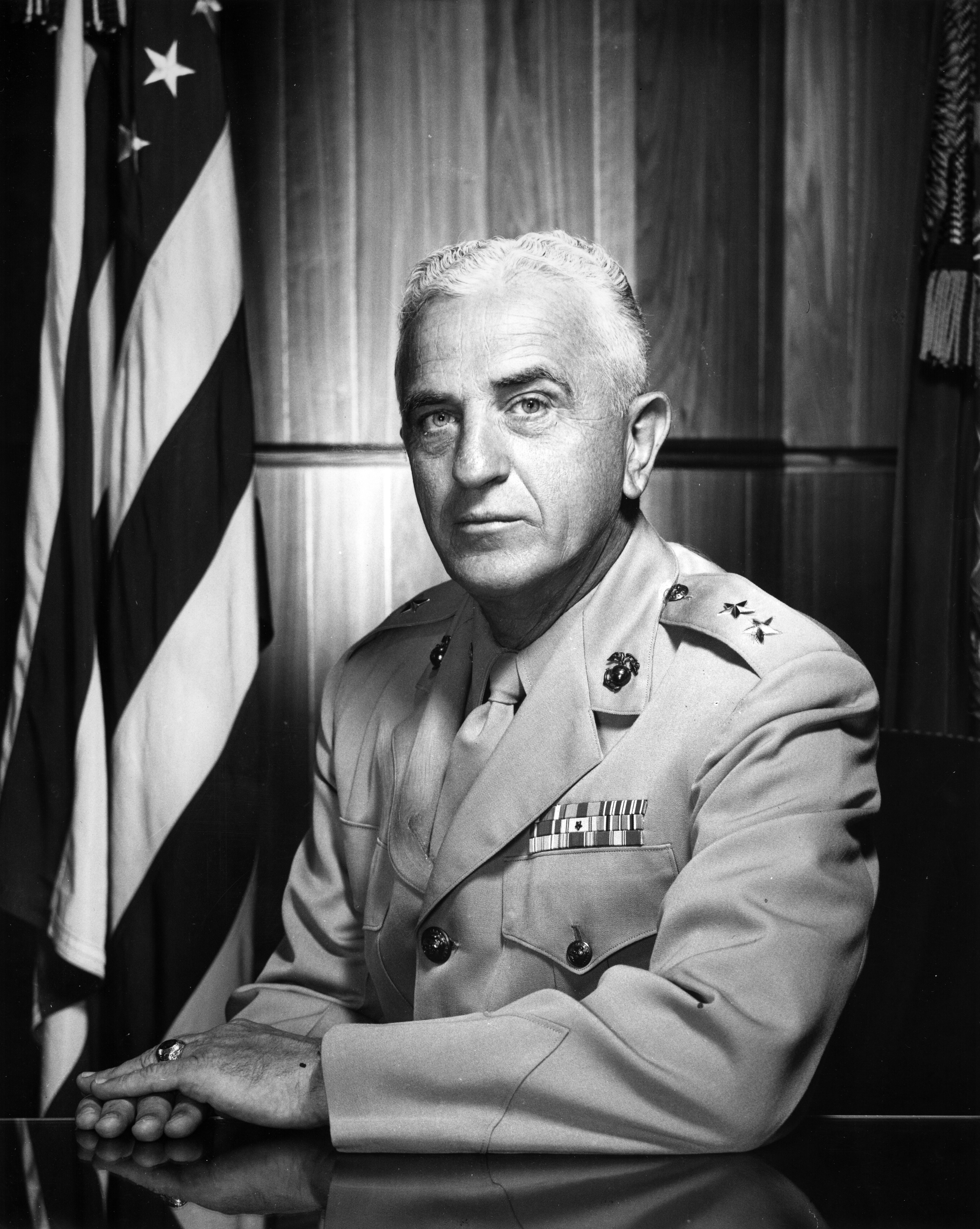
- MG Roy M. Gullick, USMC
- Born: April 12, 1904; Blooming Glen, Pennsylvania, US
- Died: September 27, 1976 (aged 72); Albany, Georgia, US
- Burial place: Arlington National Cemetery
- Military career
- Allegiance: United States of America
- Branch: United States Marine Corps
- Service years: 1926–1960
- Rank: Major general
- Service number: 0-4080
- Commands: Quartermaster General of the Marine Corps; Marine Supply Center Albany; Marine Supply Center Barstow
- Conflicts: Yangtze Patrol; Nicaraguan Campaign; World War II
- Awards: Navy Commendation Medal

Roy Moyer Gullick (April 12, 1904 – September 27, 1976) was a decorated officer of the United States Marine Corps with the rank of major general. He spent his senior career mostly in Quartermaster Department, reaching the capacity of Quartermaster General of the Marine Corps. He held this office between dates July 1, 1958 – January 1, 1960.

== Early career ==
Roy M. Gulick was born on April 12, 1904, in Blooming Glen, Pennsylvania, as the son of Christopher S. and Emma Moyer Gullick. He grew up in Doylestown, Pennsylvania, and graduated from the high school there in summer 1922. Gulick subsequently received appointment to the United States Naval Academy at Annapolis, Maryland, and following four years of study, he graduated in June 1926 with a bachelor's degree. During his time at the academy, Gulick was active in baseball and basketball teams.

He was commissioned second lieutenant in the Marine Corps upon graduation and ordered to the Basic School at Philadelphia Navy Yard for basic officer training, which he completed one year later. Gulick was then attached to the 4th Marine Regiment and sailed for his first expeditionary duty to China. He was stationed at Shanghai International Settlement for some time, before he was transferred to the 12th Marine Regiment also in China.

Gulick returned to the United States in February 1929 and after brief period of service at Quantico, he was attached to 5th Marine Regiment and sailed for Nicaragua. He served in Nicaragua until June 1931 and took part in combat operations against bandit forces under Augusto César Sandino.

Upon his return to the United States, he was promoted to the rank of first lieutenant and ordered to the Marine barracks at New York Navy Yard. Gulick was transferred to the command of Marine detachment aboard the battleship USS Wyoming in April 1934 and participated in training cruises for Naval Academy midshipmen and NROTC cadets to various destinations, including European ports, the Caribbean, and the Gulf of Mexico.

He was later promoted to captain and ordered to the Junior Course at the Marine Corps Schools, Quantico in June 1936. Gulick completed the course in May of the following year and assumed duty as an instructor at the Basic School at Philadelphia Navy Yard under Colonel Gilder D. Jackson Jr. While in this capacity, he participated in the basic training of newly commissioned marine officers until May 1940.

== World War II and later service ==
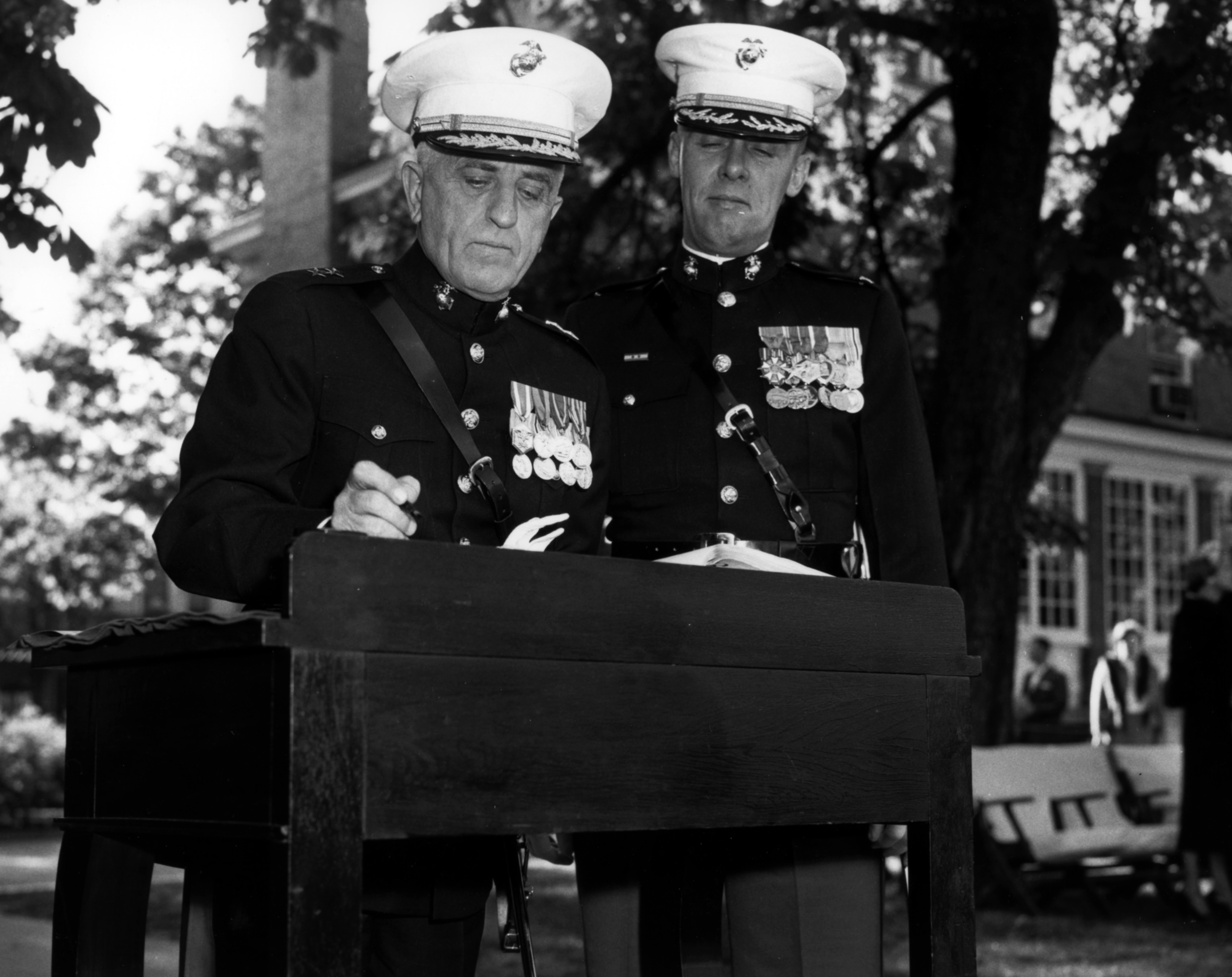
Gulick signs the guest book during the Sunset Parade at the Marine Barracks, Washington, D.C.; Commanding officer of the Barracks, Colonel Jonas M. Platt looks on.

Gulick was then transferred to the Headquarters Marine Corps in Washington, D.C., for instruction in the Paymaster Department under Brigadier General Russell B. Putnam. He completed the instruction in November 1940 and assumed duty as Paymaster, Marine Barracks, Naval Base Guantanamo, Cuba. In this capacity, he was responsible for providing financial services such as monthly payrolls, controlling disbursing and logistical activities. He was promoted to the rank of lieutenant colonel in March 1941.

Gulick was transferred back to the United States in September 1942 for duty as paymaster of the Southern Pay Area at Pensacola, Florida. He was promoted to the temporary rank of colonel in November 1942. He was transferred to Hawaii in September 1943 and served as deputy to paymaster of the Fleet Marine Force, Pacific, Brigadier General Merritt B. Curtis. Gulick remained in that assignment until the end of war and received the Navy Commendation Medal by Commanding general, FMFPac, Holland Smith.

In July 1945, Gulick was ordered to the Marine Corps Base San Diego and served again as paymaster of the base under Major General Earl C. Long. He then returned to the Headquarters Marine Corps in Washington, D.C., for duty in the Office of Paymaster General under Major General Raymond R. Wright. When Paymaster Department of the Marine Corps was merged into the Quartermaster Department in July 1946, all previous paymaster department's responsibilities were transferred to the Disbursing Branch, Supply Department. Gulick also was transferred to that department and remained there until June 1948.

Gulick was subsequently ordered to the Marine Corps Supply Activity Philadelphia under Brigadier General Leonard E. Rea and appointed officer in charge of General Supply Division. The facility in Philadelphia served to procure, store, maintain, distribute and manufacture uniforms and minor equipage, and Gulick remained there until May 1949, when he was sent to the Marine Corps Recruit Depot Parris Island, South Carolina.

He served for four years as supply officer and assistant chief of staff, G-4 (Supply) under Major General Alfred H. Noble until he was ordered for the course at the Industrial College of the Armed Forces in August 1953. Gulick completed the course in February 1954 and was promoted to the rank of brigadier general.

With the promotion to general's rank, Gulick was ordered to California and assumed command of Marine Corps Depot of Supplies at San Francisco. He served as the last commanding general of that installation until July 1954 and supervised the moving of it to the Marine Supply Center Barstow. The Barstow Center served for rebuilding and repairing of ground-combat and combat-support equipment and to support installations on the West Coast of the United States.

Gulick served in that capacity until January 1957, when he succeeded Brigadier General Ion M. Bethel as commanding general of Marine Supply Center Albany. This center had the same role as Barstow center, but only within the East Coast of the United States.

He was promoted to the rank of major general in July 1958 and appointed Quartermaster General of the Marine Corps and was responsible for the support of development, production, acquisition, and sustainment of general supply, Mortuary Affairs, subsistences, petroleum and water, material and distribution management during peace and war to provide combat power to the U.S. Marine Corps units.

== Retirement and death ==
Gulick retired from the Marine Corps after almost 34 years of active on January 1, 1960, and settled in Albany, Georgia. He then worked there for the Warren and Brimberry Life Insurance Company in charge of the Life Insurance Department for 13 years. In addition, he worked as general agent for the Franklin Life Insurance Company.

Gulick died on September 27, 1976, in Albany, Georgia, and was buried with full military honors at Arlington National Cemetery in Virginia. His wife Maude F. W. Gulick (1904–1996) is buried beside him.

In October 1982, the new commissary store at Marine Supply Center Albany was named in honor of Major General Roy M. Gulick.

== Decorations ==
Here is the ribbon bar of Major General Roy M. Gulick:

1st Row	Navy Commendation Medal	Marine Corps Expeditionary Medal	Second Nicaraguan Campaign Medal
2nd Row	Yangtze Service Medal	American Defense Service Medal with Base Clasp	American Campaign Medal
3rd Row	Asiatic-Pacific Campaign Medal	World War II Victory Medal	National Defense Service Medal

== See also ==
- William P. Battell
- Maurice C. Gregory

Military offices
Preceded by Ion M. Bethel	Quartermaster General of the Marine Corps; July 1, 1958 - January 1, 1960	Succeeded by Chester R. Allen
