= Mediapolis, Iowa =

- City
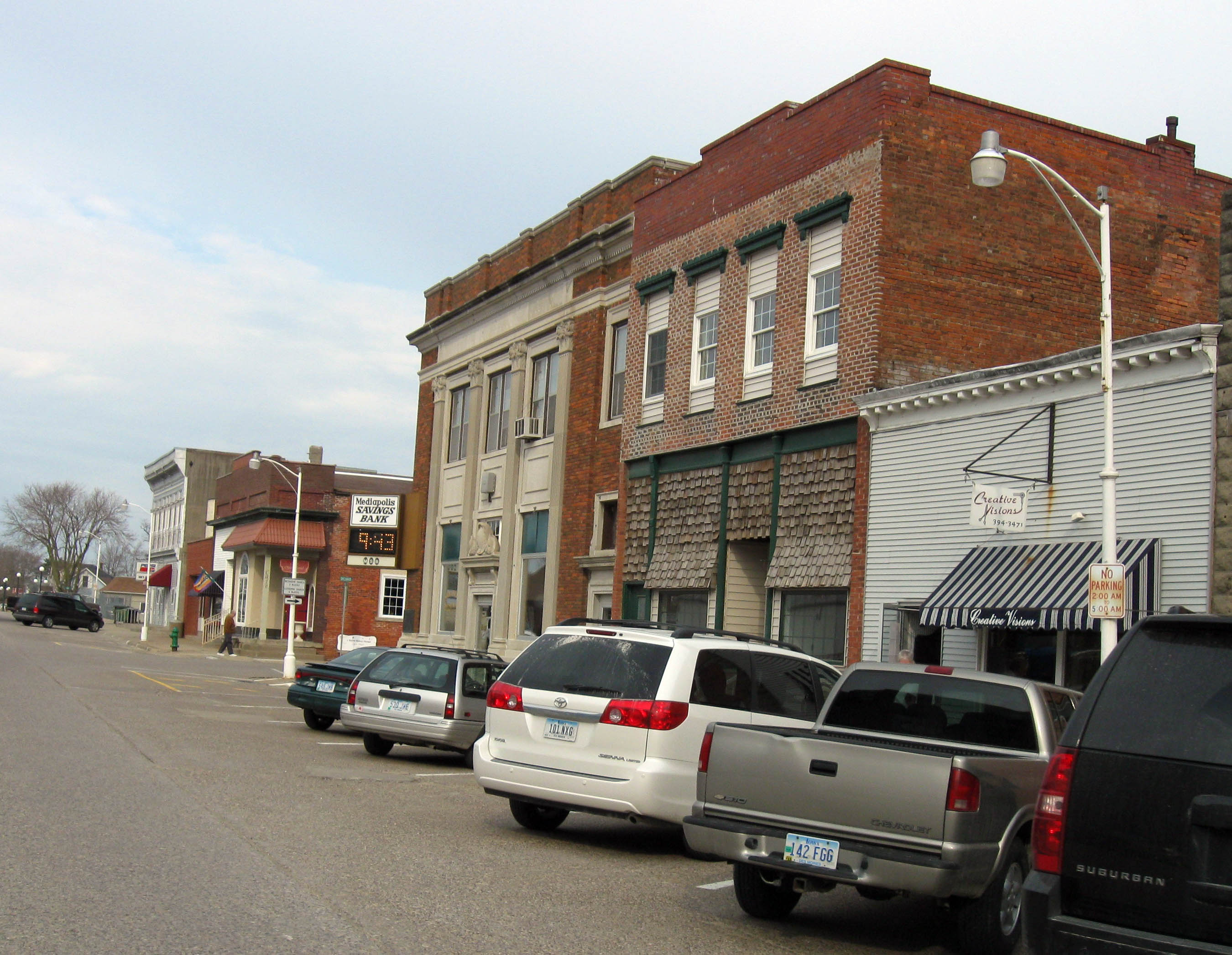
- Downtown Mediapolis

- Location of Mediapolis, Iowa
- Coordinates: 41°00′28″N 91°09′49″W
- Country: United States
- State: Iowa
- County: Des Moines

Area
  - Total: 1.20 sq mi (3.11 km^{2})
  - Land: 1.20 sq mi (3.11 km^{2})
  - Water: 0 sq mi (0.00 km^{2})
- Elevation: 771 ft (235 m)

Population (2020)
  - Total: 1,688
  - Density: 1,406.7/sq mi (543.13/km^{2})
- Time zone: UTC-6 (Central (CST))
  - Summer (DST): UTC-5 (CDT)
- ZIP code: 52637
- Area code: 319
- FIPS code: 19-50790
- GNIS feature ID: 2395081

Mediapolis is a city in Des Moines County, Iowa, United States. Its population was 1,688 at the time of the 2020 census. It is part of the Burlington, IA–IL Micropolitan Statistical Area.

== History ==
Mediapolis was founded in the year 1869. It was first a train station for the city of Kossuth, Iowa at a point on the Burlington, Cedar Rapids and Minnesota Railway (later part of the Chicago, Rock Island and Pacific) between Burlington and Wapello. Media, meaning "middle," was appended to polis, meaning "village," as Mediapolis is halfway between Wapello and Burlington.

From 1875 to the mid 20th century, Mediapolis was a railroad junction where the Burlington and Northwestern Railway to Washington (later a branch of the Chicago, Burlington and Quincy) met the original north–south line.

The Rock Island Railroad ceased operation in 1980, leading to the abandonment of the north–south line through Mediapolis. One heavy industry remains two miles southwest of town, the United States Gypsum Sperry mine. This is a shaft mine 620 feet deep, opened in 1961 and employing approximately 200 people as of 2010. Of these, only 25 to 50 actually work in the mine. Underground, the mine extends 1.5 miles west and 1.75 miles south of the shaft. This is a room and pillar mine with 37-foot pillars separating roads 37 feet wide on a square grid.

On August 10, 1998, former NFL running back Tony Baker was killed on U.S. Route 61, just south of Mediapolis.

== Geography ==
According to the United States Census Bureau, the city has a total area of 1.20 square miles (3.11 km^{2}), all land.

== Demographics ==
Historical populations
Year	Pop.	±%
1880	423	—
1890	489	+15.6%
1900	725	+48.3%
1910	858	+18.3%
1920	780	−9.1%
1930	793	+1.7%
1940	806	+1.6%
1950	834	+3.5%
1960	1,040	+24.7%
1970	1,242	+19.4%
1980	1,685	+35.7%
1990	1,637	−2.8%
2000	1,644	+0.4%
2010	1,560	−5.1%
2020	1,688	+8.2%
Source:"U.S. Census website". United States Census Bureau. and Iowa Data Center; Source: U.S. Decennial Census

=== 2020 census ===
As of the 2020 census, Mediapolis had a population of 1,688 people, with 640 households and 420 families. The population density was 1,400.9 inhabitants per square mile (540.9/km^{2}). There were 684 housing units at an average density of 567.7 per square mile (219.2/km^{2}).

The median age was 36.2 years. 28.8% of residents were under the age of 18 and 18.3% were 65 years of age or older. The age distribution was 30.9% under 20, 4.4% from 20 to 24, 24.6% from 25 to 44, 21.9% from 45 to 64, and 18.3% 65 or older. For every 100 females, there were 89.9 males, and for every 100 females age 18 and over, there were 87.2 males age 18 and over.

0.0% of residents lived in urban areas, while 100.0% lived in rural areas.

Of the 640 households, 36.9% had children under the age of 18 living with them. Of all households, 50.9% were married-couple households, 15.9% were households with a male householder and no spouse or partner present, and 26.6% were households with a female householder and no spouse or partner present. Non-families made up 34.4% of households. About 30.0% of all households were made up of individuals, and 14.1% had someone living alone who was 65 years of age or older.

Of the 684 housing units, 6.4% were vacant. The homeowner vacancy rate was 2.3% and the rental vacancy rate was 4.5%.

Racial composition as of the 2020 census
Race	Number	Percent
White	1,575	93.3%
Black or African American	23	1.4%
American Indian and Alaska Native	0	0.0%
Asian	2	0.1%
Native Hawaiian and Other Pacific Islander	0	0.0%
Some other race	10	0.6%
Two or more races	78	4.6%
Hispanic or Latino (of any race)	23	1.4%

=== 2010 census ===
As of the census of 2010, there were 1,560 people, 628 households, and 407 families residing in the city. The population density was 1,300.0 inhabitants per square mile (501.9/km^{2}). There were 680 housing units at an average density of 566.7 per square mile (218.8/km^{2}). The racial makeup of the city was 98.5% White, 0.3% African American, 0.1% Native American, 0.3% from other races, and 0.8% from two or more races. Hispanic or Latino of any race were 1.0% of the population.

There were 628 households, of which 32.3% had children under the age of 18 living with them, 49.7% were married couples living together, 10.8% had a female householder with no husband present, 4.3% had a male householder with no wife present, and 35.2% were non-families. 31.7% of all households were made up of individuals, and 14.3% had someone living alone who was 65 years of age or older. The average household size was 2.36 and the average family size was 2.96.

The median age in the city was 41.6 years. 24% of residents were under the age of 18; 6.9% were between the ages of 18 and 24; 23.6% were from 25 to 44; 26.2% were from 45 to 64; and 19.4% were 65 years of age or older. The gender makeup of the city was 49.3% male and 50.7% female.

=== 2000 census ===
As of the census of 2000, there were 1,644 people, 644 households, and 439 families residing in the city. The population density was 1,364.3 inhabitants per square mile (526.8/km^{2}). There were 684 housing units at an average density of 567.6 per square mile (219.2/km^{2}). The racial makeup of the city was 99.09% White, 0.12% African American, 0.18% Asian, 0.06% from other races, and 0.55% from two or more races. Hispanic or Latino of any race were 0.67% of the population.

There were 644 households, out of which 33.5% had children under the age of 18 living with them, 55.0% were married couples living together, 9.9% had a female householder with no husband present, and 31.8% were non-families. 29.0% of all households were made up of individuals, and 16.3% had someone living alone who was 65 years of age or older. The average household size was 2.37 and the average family size was 2.92.

24.8% are under the age of 18, 6.6% from 18 to 24, 23.8% from 25 to 44, 21.7% from 45 to 64, and 23.1% are 65 years of age or older. The median age was 40 years. For every 100 females, there were 86.6 males. For every 100 females age 18 and over, there were 81.2 males.

== School ==
On the north side of Mediapolis is the Mediapolis Community School District, an elementary, middle, and high school serving Mediapolis and a large rural area around Mediapolis. The school's sports teams are the Bulldogs and Bullettes.

== Notable people ==
- William P. Battell, Major General and former Quartermaster General of the Marine Corps.
- Virginia Christine, American actress, graduated in 1937 from Mediapolis High School.
- Vernon "Bud" McLearn (1933–1999) Iowa basketball coach
