= Perry L. Christensen =

American politician (born 1932)

Member of the Iowa House of Representatives
- In office 1967–1973

Personal details
- Born: August 30, 1932 (age 93) Creston, Iowa, U.S.
- Party: Republican
- Occupation: farmer

Perry L. Christensen (August 30, 1932 – June 25, 2011) was an American politician in the state of Iowa.

Christensen was born in Creston, Iowa. He was a farmer. He served in the Iowa House of Representatives from 1967 to 1973 as a Republican.
