= Marine Corps Logistics Base Barstow =

US Marine Corps base near Barstow, California, US

- Near Barstow, California in the United States
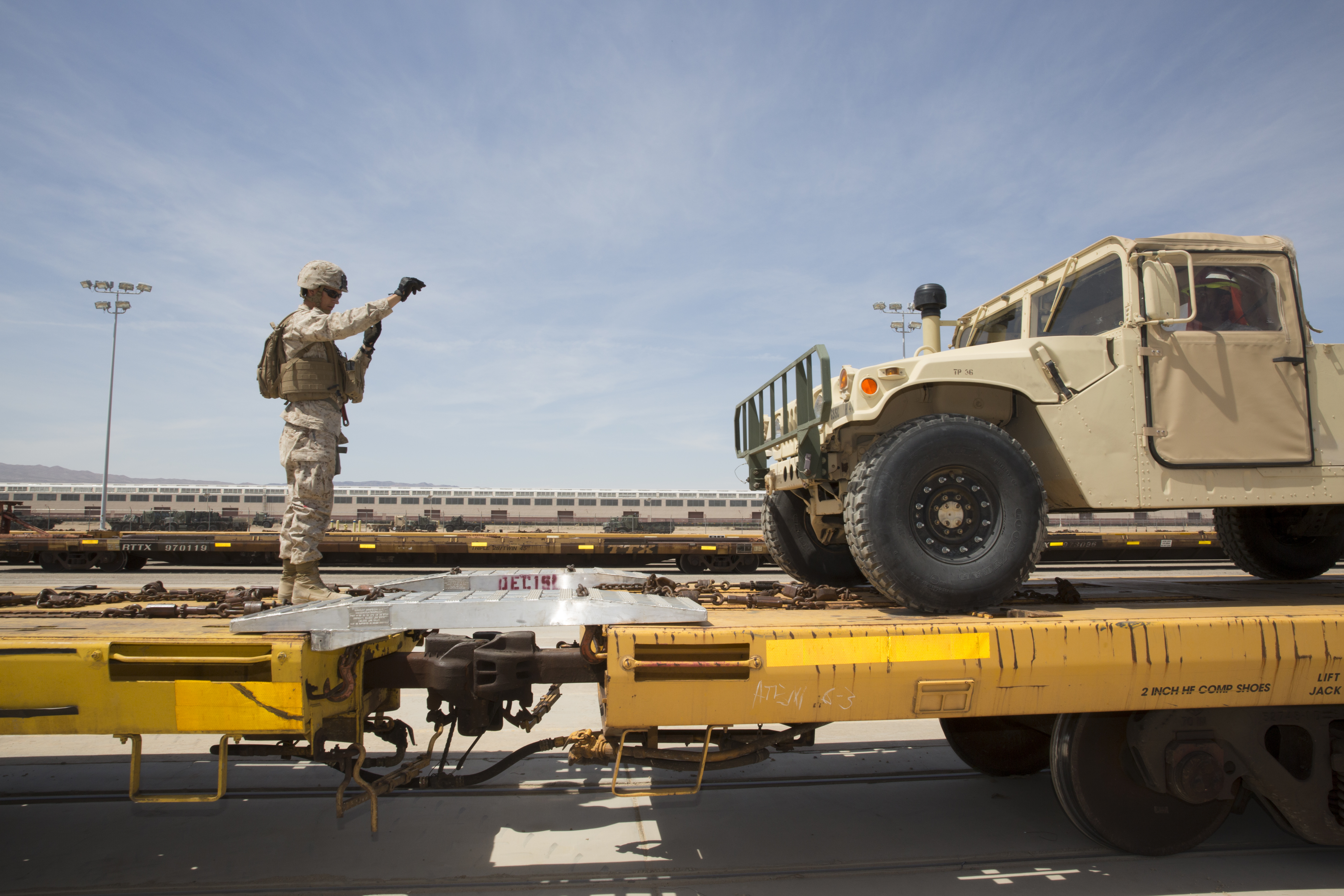
- Combat Logistics Battalion 7 (CLB-7) personnel guide a Humvee onto a railway wagon at MCLB Barstow

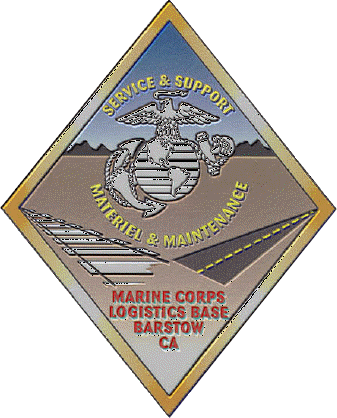

Site information
- Type: Marine Corps logistics base
- Owner: Department of Defense
- Operator: US Marine Corps
- Controlled by: Marine Corps Installations West
- Condition: Operational
- Website: Official website

Location
- Location in the United States
- Coordinates: 34°51′17″N 116°56′24″W

Site history
- Built: 1942 (as Marine Corps Depot of Supplies)
- In use: 1942 – present

Garrison information
- Current commander: Colonel Gregory B. Pace

Marine Corps Logistics Base Barstow is a United States Marine Corps supply and maintenance installation located in the Mojave Desert east of Barstow, in San Bernardino County, Southern California.

Its mission is to rebuild and repair ground-combat and combat-support equipment and to support installations on the West Coast of the United States. Today, one of MCLB Barstow's most important facilities is the Marine Corps Logistics Bases' Maintenance Center. The only other facility of this kind is located at MCLB Barstow's sister installation, Marine Corps Logistics Base Albany.

== Location ==
The base is located on Interstate 40, 3.5 miles (6 km) east of the city of Barstow. The base lies at the junction of three major highways systems of I-15, I-40, and SR 58. It is approximately 98 miles from the Marine Corps Air Ground Combat Center Twentynine Palms. The base is within 150 miles (240 km) of the two major seaports of Los Angeles and San Diego.

== History ==
The Marine Corps Logistics Base, presently the second largest employer in the Barstow area, was established as the Marine Corps Depot of Supplies at its present location on December 28, 1942, when the United States Navy turned it over to the Marine Corps as a storage site for supplies and equipment needed for Fleet Marine Forces in the Pacific theater during World War II. By the end of World War II, the base had outgrown its facilities and as a result, 2,000 acres (8 km^{2}) of land, approximately seven miles east of the Nebo Main Base were annexed from the United States Army in October 1946. In 1954, the Commanding General, Marine Corps Depot of Supplies, Roy M. Gulick, moved his flag from San Francisco to Barstow and since then the base has grown in stature, strength and size.

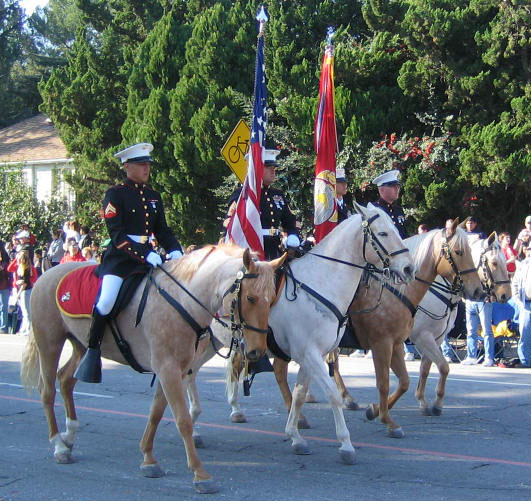
MCLB Barstow has the only horse mounted color guard in the Marine Corps.

In March 1961, the importance of MCLB Barstow increased dramatically with the establishment of the Depot Maintenance Activity. (Need Help to correct the start date if needed--"In 1977 TOW Company was assigned to MCLB Barstow through 1980 while facilities were being built at 29 Palms, California.") In November 1978, the base was redesignated to its present title of Marine Corps Logistics Base to emphasize its broad logistics support mission. In the early 1980s, MCLB Albany and Headquarters Marine Corps worked aggressively to integrate logistics support for the Fleet Marine Force and eliminate duplications. As a result, all operational logistics functions moved to Albany and in January 1990, the Commanding General, Marine Corps Logistics Base Albany, was redesignated Commander Marine Corps Logistics Bases. The command was redesignated again in 2003 as a result of the merging of Material Command MATCOM and Marine Corps Logistics Bases to form Marine Corps Logistics Command (MARCORLOGCOM).

In late 2005, MCLB Barstow started a transition from military police to civilian police to free Marines for deployment; the Provost Marshal Office, military police, was augmented with a civilian Marine Corps Police Department, while many of the Marine Military Police stationed aboard the base have transferred to other commands. The transition from a Provost Marshal Office to a Marine Corps Police Department ended in 2007. As of late 2007, the department became the first police department in the Marine Corps to consist of all civilian officers. In 2010, the department became a blended force again with military police.

== Sites ==
The base comprises three principal sites: Nebo Annex, Yermo Annex, and a third 2,438 acres (10 km^{2}) site serving as rifle and pistol ranges.

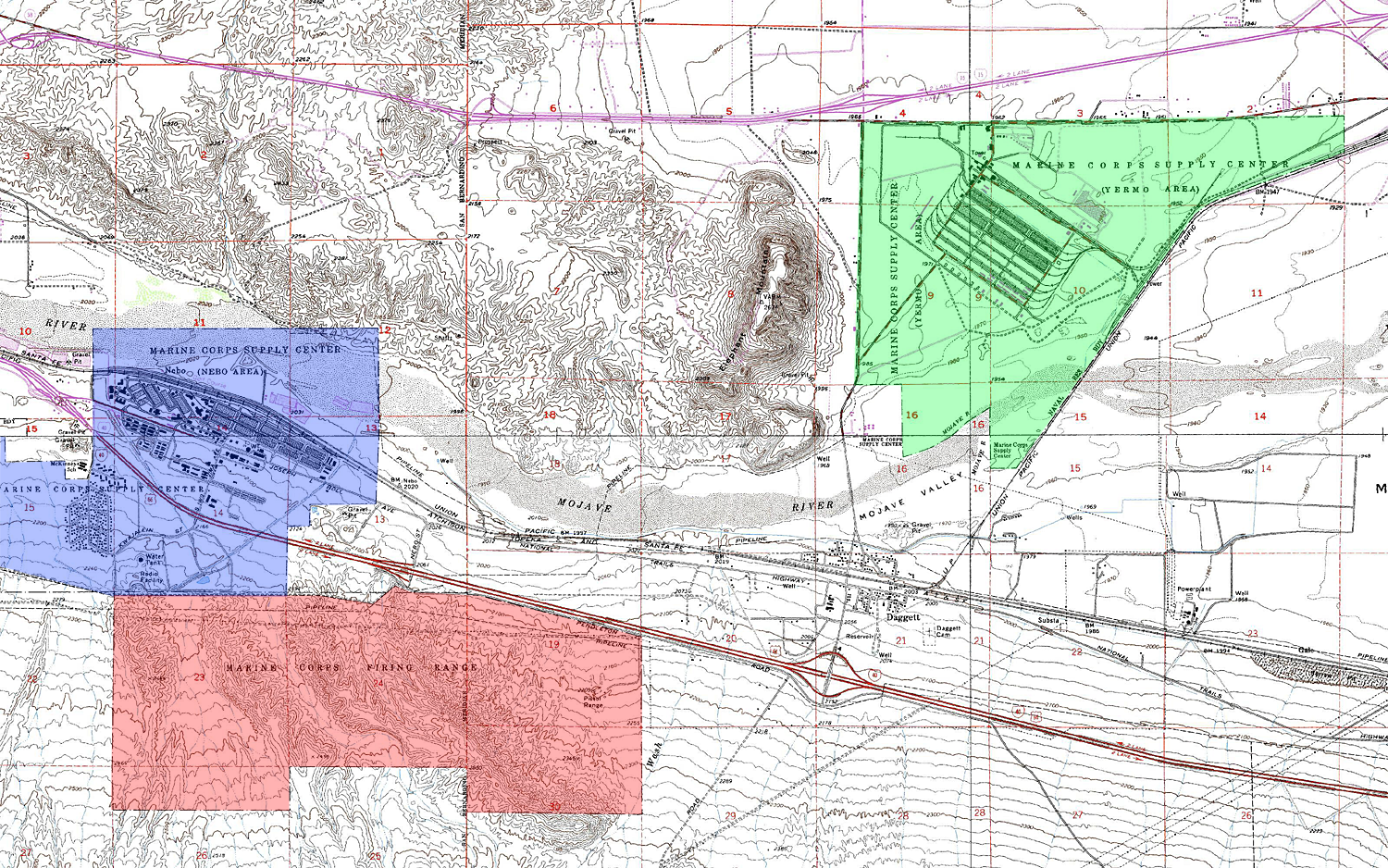
Map of the location of the three units of MCLB. The Nebo Annex is blue, Yermo Annex is green, and the firing range is red.

=== Nebo Annex ===
The Nebo Annex encompasses 1,879 acres (8 km^{2}) and functions as base headquarters and is the main facility for administration, storage, recreational activities, shopping, and housing functions. The Nebo annex had a population of 1,174 as of the 2000 Census. Of the population 54% is male; 65.6% is between the ages of 18 and 64, and 34.2% is under 18. The median age is 22.6.

=== Yermo Annex ===
The Yermo Annex, (Yermo Marine Corps Supply Center) in the town of Yermo, encompasses 1,859 acres (8 km^{2}) and is primarily a storage and industrial complex for the Marine Corps.

=== World War 2 ===
Yermo Holding and Reconsignment Point opened on July 22, 1942, to control the shipment of supplies into West Coast ports by rail. In October 1946 the facility was transferred to Marine Corps Depot of Supplies. Later renamed Marine Corps Logistics Base Barstow in November 1978. During World War 2 the site housed:

- Yermo Holding and Reconsignment Point: For storing lend-lease supplies and supplies assigned to go overseas.
- Yermo Sub-Depot: 2,031 acres for Ammunition Igloos and Ammunition magazines storage.
- Yermo Army Service Forces Depot: transferred to the Navy Department in 1947.
- Yermo Transportation Corps Sub-Depot, under command of the Lathrop Transportation Corps Depot in Lathrop, California.
- Yermo Quartermaster Sub-Depot was under the command of the Mira Loma Quartermaster Depot in Mira Loma, California.

Stationed at the Yermo depots during World War 2:

- 359th and 361st Quartermaster Service Companies
- 129th, 130th and 131st Italian Quartermaster Service Companies
- 2nd Platoon, 351st Quartermaster Service Company (Colored)
- 7907th Service Command Unit at Yermo Holding and Reconsignment Point
- 9216th Transportation Corps Technical Service Unit at Yermo Holding and Reconsignment Point
- 3992nd Service Command Unit at Mira Loma Quartermaster Depot

== See also ==
- List of United States Marine Corps installations
- California during World War II
- Military facilities in California
