= Louie Zumbach =

American politician

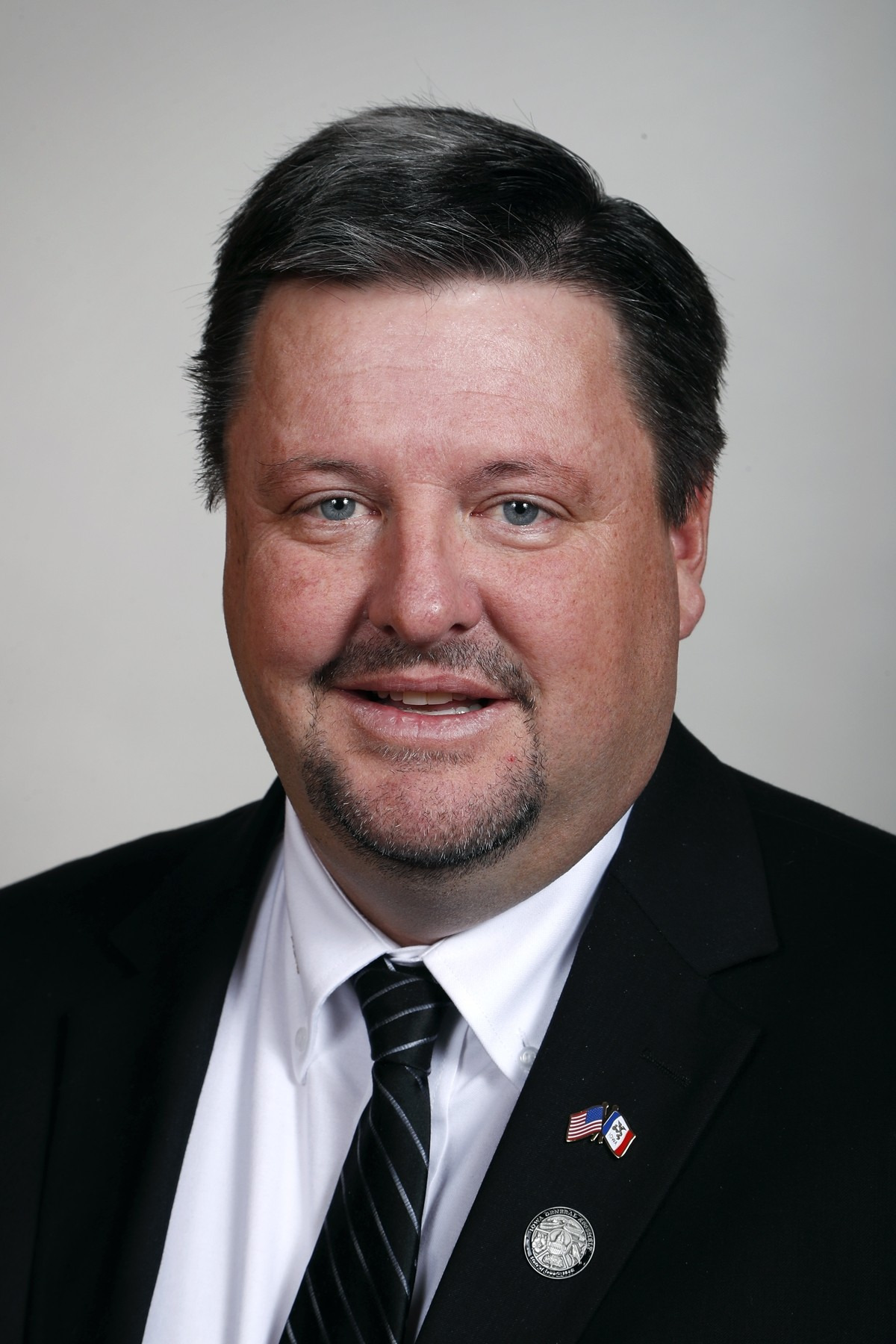

Member of the Linn County Board of Supervisors from the 3rd District
- Incumbent
- Assumed office January 4, 2021
- Preceded by: Brent Oleson

Member of the Iowa House of Representatives from the 95th district
- In office 2017 – January 11, 2021
- Preceded by: Quentin Stanerson
- Succeeded by: Charlie McClintock

Personal details
- Born: October 28, 1965 (age 60) Coggon, Iowa, U.S.
- Party: Republican
- Spouse: Deb
- Children: 4
- Education: Kirkwood Community College

Louie Zumbach (born October 28, 1965) is an American politician who served as a member of the Iowa House of Representatives for the 95th district from 2017 to 2021. He currently serves on the Linn County Board of Supervisors.
