= Iraq prison abuse scandals =

The Iraq prison abuse scandals involved numerous cases and allegations of detainee abuse in Iraq following the 2003 invasion of Iraq. Most involved U.S. forces, although cases involving British troops and, later, Iraqi security forces were also reported. Abu Ghraib prison became the best-known site, but abuse was reported elsewhere, including at Camp Bucca, Camp Cropper, Camp Whitehorse, Qaim, and Samarra. Prisoners were reported to have been beaten, sexually abused or humiliated, kept in stress positions, subjected to mock executions and electric shocks, exposed to harsh conditions, and in some cases killed while in custody. The International Committee of the Red Cross raised concerns with the U.S. Army in October 2003 and later said that some of the torture it had found was systemic rather than the work of isolated individuals.

The scandal drew international attention in 2004, when photographs from Abu Ghraib showing U.S. soldiers humiliating and abusing prisoners were released. Seymour Hersh reported on the prison in The New Yorker. The Taguba Report, which also became public, described sexual abuse, forced masturbation, the concealment of ghost detainees from the Red Cross, and other mistreatment. A number of official inquiries examined detainee treatment, among them the Ryder, Taguba, Fay, and Church Reports. U.S. military personnel were prosecuted in courts-martial. British soldiers also faced investigations and prosecutions; Corporal Donald Payne pleaded guilty to abusing Iraqi detainees in the case involving the death of Baha Mousa.

Reports continued after Abu Ghraib. In January 2005, Human Rights Watch reported torture, arbitrary detention, and other mistreatment by Iraqi security forces. Later that year it published accounts from U.S. soldiers who said that abuse of Iraqi detainees by American troops had been routine. In 2010, U.S. military records released through WikiLeaks described additional abuse by American forces and many reports of torture, rape, and other mistreatment by Iraqi police and soldiers that U.S. authorities did not investigate. Amnesty International also reported in 2010 that unlawful detention, torture, and abuse remained widespread in Iraqi prisons.

== Iraqi prisons where abuse incidents have been documented ==
Abu Ghraib prison	beating death; sexual abuse and humiliation; stress positions
Camp Bucca	
Camp Cropper	
Camp Whitehorse	beating deaths; stress positions
Qaim	murder of Abed Hamed Mowhoush
Samarra	mock executions, cigarette burns, choking, adolescent detainees. beatings

== Official investigations into abuse incidents ==
common name	mandate
Ryder Report	
Taguba Report	
Fay Report	
Church Report	

== Timeline of events ==
According to The Washington Post, the coalition forces regularly use "torture-like" methods during the interrogation of suspects. Such methods were reportedly applied to people to find the hiding place of Saddam Hussein in Operation Red Dawn. British troops have also on occasion been accused of abusing Iraqi detainees. Such treatment violates article 17 of the Third Geneva Convention and the USA and Britain's official policies on combat and occupation. Despite numerous complaints by Amnesty International and Human Rights Watch, it took a year before the first US soldier was court-martialed for their actions concerning abuse of Iraqis.

=== Unknown date ===
Eight marine reservists were investigated for abuse and the death of a prisoner, outside Nasiriyah.

A photograph leaked after the initial set shows Spc. Sabrina Harman smiling and giving a thumbs up next to the body of Manadel al-Jamadi. Jamadi was reportedly beaten to death during interrogations in the prison's showers. Death certificates repeatedly stated that prisoners had died "while sleeping", and of "natural reasons". Iraqi doctors are not allowed to investigate the deaths of prisoners, even if death certificates are allegedly forged. No investigations against US military doctors who are alleged to have forged death certificates have been reported.

=== Spring 2003 ===
A US veteran sergeant reports witnessing torture of journalists and writers all over Iraq. Kurdistan region was not an exception. Writers without Borders embarrassed the Iraqi government quite frequently in reports covering minority, women and marginalised Iraqis from all over the country but with much focus on Baghdad, Karkuk, Salahedin and Mosul.

Honorably discharged US veteran, Sergeant Frank "Greg" Ford reports that he witnessed war crimes in Samarra, Iraq. According to Ford, several members of his own unit, the 205th Military Intelligence Brigade participated in the torture of Iraqi detainees as young as 14.

Ather Karen al-Mowafakia died in Basra, while in British custody. Details about the investigation are not known.

Gary Bartlam, a British soldier of the 7th Armoured Brigade, was arrested after submitting film to a photo developers shop in Tamworth, England while on leave. The photographs depict a gagged Iraqi POW suspended hanging by rope from a fork lift, and other pictures seem to show prisoners being forced to perform sexual acts. Bartlam and two other soldiers were convicted at court martial of abuse - a fourth soldier was cleared.

British Lieutenant Colonel Tim Collins was alleged by US Army Major Re Biastre to have been responsible for mistreatment of Iraqi civilians and prisoners of war. Lieutenant Colonel Collins was later cleared of any wrongdoing by an MOD investigation.

=== May 2003 ===
In separate incidents, the Royal Military Police declared that Radhi Natna died of a heart attack while in British custody, yet his family reports that he had no heart trouble; and the Black Watch regiment arrested the 17-year-old Ahmad Jabber Kareem Ali in Basra, who then drowned after being ordered to swim across a river despite not being able to swim, according to his friend Ayad Salim Hanoon.

Army Reservists abused Prisoners at Camp Bucca, and were later court-martialed.

Brigadier General Ennis Whitehead III reported that Master Sergeant Lisa Marie Girman, a state trooper, "repeatedly kick[ed a prisoner] in the groin, abdomen and head, and encouraging her subordinate soldiers to do the same,"

Lieutenant Colonel Vic Harris reported that Staff Sergeant Scott A. McKenzie who worked at a Pennsylvania Department of Corrections boot-camp-style prison, and Specialist Timothy F. Canjar: held prisoners' legs, encouraged others to then kick them in the groin, stepped on their previously injured arms, and made false sworn statements to the Army Criminal Investigation Division.

They received "general under honorable conditions" discharges, were ordered to forfeit two months' salary, and returned to the United States.

Sergeant Shawna Edmondson, also involved in the case, received an "other-than-honorable" discharge, after she requested it instead of being court-martialed.

Hossam Shaltout said the abuse at Camp Bucca was similar to that at Abu Ghraib prisoner abuse, and that his torture included scorpions placed on his body.

Said Shabram died in custody, but no information of the investigation were made public.

=== July to December 2003 ===
American forces detained the family of an unidentified lieutenant general to induce him to turn himself in.

The abuses at Abu Ghraib prison were reportedly committed by MPs. There are allegations that private contractors contributed to them as well and that intelligence agencies such as the CIA ordered them to do so in order to break prisoners for interrogations. It is said to be a usual practice in other US prisons as well, such as in Afghanistan and Guantanamo Bay.

The International Committee of the Red Cross submitted a detailed report to the U.S. Army in October 2003 about abuses in prisons, and the president of the Red Cross stated he had informed high-ranking members of the Bush administration about the abuses during a meeting in the White House in January 2004. A soldier came forward that month with photos of abuse that he found disturbing, some showed the stacking of prisoners into a human pyramid, with one prisoner's skin visibly bearing a slur written in English. Another showed a prisoner being forced to stand on a box with wires attached to his head and hands, who had reportedly been told that if he fell off the box, he would be electrocuted. Photos released to the public later included a person being attacked by a guard dog, which the soldier involved described as being useful for intimidation of prisoners. It was also reported that an Iraqi hired as a translator raped a juvenile male prisoner while a female soldier took pictures. No charges have been brought against the contractor because he does not fall under military jurisdiction; it is questionable whether any charges will or even can be brought against him.

Donald Rumsfeld had said that army and government had only been informed in January and not in detail. On January 16, 2004, a press release was issued by the United States Central Command (CENTCOM) stating that an investigation had been initiated in response to allegations of detainee abuse at an unspecified detention facility (now known to be Abu Ghraib prison).

In March 2004, 6 soldiers in Abu Ghraib were charged with dereliction of duty, cruelty and maltreatment, and sexual abuse. 17 others were suspended from duty, including the seven U.S. officers who ran the prison. Also recommended for discipline was Brig. Gen Janis Karpinski, the commander of the 800th brigade. The Red Cross, which had access to these prisons, has stated that the instances of torture were not aberrations but were systemic. Some officers have attempted to defend themselves by saying that they were only doing their duty.

In response to ongoing complaints, the US military initiated a program to reform the internment and treatment systems. The reforms are expected to increase safeguards for prisoners' rights, to ensure each prisoner receives a copy of their internment order, and has their charges explained to them within 72 hours. They additionally plan to publicly post information about detainees so that family members can know what happened to their loved ones. Reforms were made in March 2004.

Theft of prisoner's possessions by soldiers, dirty, cramped quarters and bad food, prisoners forced into uncomfortable positions for prolonged periods of time, extreme exposure to the elements, and excessive jailings of people based on the paid testimony of individual informants were reported. 55-year-old cafe owner Mahmoud Khodair, who was arrested and held for six months before being released in early March without ever knowing what he was charged with, stated, "It was just like hell", and "Nothing has changed since Saddam. Before, the Mukhabarat [secret police] would take us away, and at least they wouldn't blow down the door. Now, some informant fingers you and gets $100 even if you're innocent."

During April 2004 the media started to report on the abuse. The journalist Seymour Hersh (who was awarded the Pulitzer Prize for his disclosure of the Vietnam War tragedy at the hamlet of My Lai) published a series of articles in The New Yorker with photo coverage of U.S. soldiers abusing prisoners in the Abu Ghraib prison on 2004-04-30.

In an interview with Dan Rather, the deputy director of operations for the US-led coalition, Brig. Gen. Mark Kimmitt, stated "We're appalled. These are our fellow soldiers. These are the people we work with every day. They represent us. They wear the same uniform as us, and they let their fellow soldiers down. If we can't hold ourselves up as an example of how to treat people with dignity and respect, we can't ask that other nations do that to our soldiers."

On May 1, 2004, photos of prisoners at Abu Ghraib prison in Iraq being abused and humiliated by United States soldiers provoke an international outrage.

Furthering the charges, excerpts from the Abu Ghraib Taguba report were published on May 3, 2004. The report documented: the sodomizing of a prisoner with a chemical light, pouring phosphoric liquid on detainees, rape of a female prisoner, forced masturbation, "ghost detainees" moved around to avoid the Red Cross, and many other abuses.

The release of the photographs and reports had led to renewed calls for investigations into the abuses reported in other US military prisons, such as Camp X-Ray and Camp Delta.

On May 14, 2004, reporters for the Guardian documented a coercive technique which soldiers called "bitch in a box". The prisoner was shoved into the trunk of a car on a hot day, and driven around until the prisoner was near ready to pass out. Another technique documented was "waterboarding", which involves water being poured over a cloth covering the face and breathing passages of an immobilized captive, causing the individual to experience the sensation of drowning. They also interviewed many soldiers not involved in the current scandal, who claimed that they were taught to use sleep deprivation, to stage mock executions, and to use other procedures. One platoon leader who objected to these practices was reportedly told that his stand could end his military career.

USA Defence Secretary Donald Rumsfeld told an armed services committee of the Senate on 2004-05-07 that "There are a lot more photographs and videos that exist [...] I looked at them last night and they're hard to believe [...] The pictures I've seen depict conduct, behaviour that is so brutal and so cruel and so inhumane that anyone engaged in it or involved in it would have to be brought to justice." He also said that the abused detainees may be offered compensation.

In a scene described as "surreal" by AFP, it was found in mid May, 2004 that US troops were handing out cash to freed prisoners along with a note stating "You have not been mistreated.". A reporter visiting the prison Camp War Horse described the tour:

"Have you been mistreated?" the governor asks the detainees, dressed in orange boilersuits.

"No. We have never been tortured," chorused those behind bars as some 50 soldiers stood nearby.

=== August 2003 ===
It was claimed that eleven Iraqis had been severely beaten by members of the SAS in Majar al-Kabir; they were released and paid compensation for their injuries.

Sadiq Zoman, 57, is delivered in a vegetative state, to a hospital in Tikrit. His body bearing telltale signs of torture: burn marks on his skin, bludgeon marks on the back of his head, a badly broken thumb, electrical burns on the soles of his feet. Additionally, family members say they found whip marks across his back and more electrical burns on his genitalia. He had entered US custody healthy barely 1 month earlier.

Hassan Abbad Said died in custody, but no information of the investigation were made public.

=== September 2003 ===
Corporal Donald Payne of the Queen's Lancashire Regiment now the 1st Battalion, Duke of Lancaster's Regiment (King's, Lancashire and Border), became Britain's first convicted war criminal after pleading guilty to abusing Iraqi detainees, which resulted in the death of one detainee Baha Mousa.

=== November 2003 ===
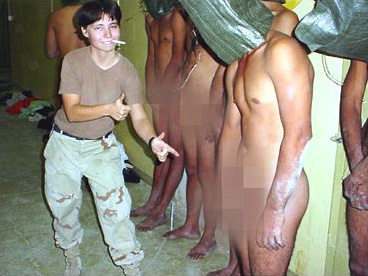
U.S. Army soldier Lynndie England poses with naked prisoners in Abu Ghraib prison in 2003. Rape, torture, humiliation, and other abuses of detainees took place in the facility.

An al Jazeera cameraman, Salah Hassan, reported various abuses in the Abu Ghraib prison complex, such as being forced to strip naked, standing up for 11 hours and being kicked when he collapsed, being forced to wear a vomit-covered jumpsuit, and many other abuses. He later also witnessed a 12- or 13-year-old girl who was stripped naked and beaten. Her brother was held in another cell and heard her screams.

=== January 2004 ===
January 3: Marwan Hassoun and his cousin Zaydun Al-Samarrai are taken from their broken-down truck at about curfew time and forced to jump from the Tharthar dam into the Tigris River; the latter drowns. First Lt. Jack M. Saville and Sgt. 1st Class Tracy E. Perkins were charged on 2004 June 7 with manslaughter, assault, conspiracy, making false statements, and obstruction of justice. Sgt. Reggie Martinez was charged three weeks later with manslaughter and for making false statements, and Spec. Terry Bowman with assault and making false statements. Martinez' and Bowman's charges were dropped; Perkins got six months in jail. Saville was jailed (45 days) and fined $12,000 for assault but he remained on active duty until his military obligation was fulfilled.

==== Daily Mirror false allegations ====
Alleged photographs of prisoner abuses by UK troops were published by the Daily Mirror within 48 hours of the breaking of the story of abuses by US troops in the Abu Ghraib prison in Iraq.

General Sir Mike Jackson, Chief of the General Staff, said "if proven, the perpetrators are not fit to wear the Queen's uniform and they have besmirched the Army's good name and conduct".

The authenticity of the photographs was called into question a day later. In particular, a number of specifics in the images, such as the type of rifles the soldiers in the pictures are carrying and the type of truck pictured did not match the equipment used by UK troops in Iraq. The Mirror responded to these criticisms of the photographs on May 3, 2004.

On May 14, 2004, the Daily Mirror reported that the pictures it had published, allegedly showing UK troops abusing an Iraqi prisoner, were fake and that "the Daily Mirror has been the subject of a calculated and malicious hoax." The Daily Mirror editor, Piers Morgan, was sacked due to the controversy.

==== Rape Accusations ====
On May 11, 2004, The Boston Globe covered a press conference by Boston City Councilor Chuck Turner and local civil rights activist Sadiki Kambon during which they distributed photographs they alleged showed American soldiers raping Iraqi woman. In its early editions on May 12, photographs from the event clearly showed some of the pictures presented, the Globe later apologized for the error. Other news agencies quickly responded to the story by linking the photographs to American and Hungarian pornography sites. Several sources stated that Iraqi females, including teenage girls, were sexually assaulted while being detained at Abu Ghraib and other US military detention facilities across Iraq. American journalist Tara McKelvey, writing for the magazine The American Prospect, interviewed an Iraqi sheik in the fall of 2004 about this issue and he told her that "he had seen a young girl, 15 years old, with internal bleeding. She had been raped over and over again by the soldiers, and she could no longer talk. He is a deeply religious man. But that night, he shouted at Allah. ‘How is it possible that you are there and these things are happening?!' he said.”

==== Amnesty International report ====
Amnesty International has alleged that the MOD has refused to properly investigate allegations of war crimes committed by their troops.

=== February 2004 ===
Death in U.S. custody of chemistry professor Mohammed Munim al-Izmerly. An autopsy concluded death was caused by a sudden hit to the back of his head and that the cause of death was blunt trauma.

=== June 2004 ===
The Pentagon confirms a report in The New York Times that CIA chief George Tenet was allowed by U.S. Secretary of Defense Donald Rumsfeld to have an Iraqi prisoner secretly detained at Camp Cropper in November, preventing the International Committee of the Red Cross from monitoring their treatment, a possible violation of the Geneva Conventions.

June 29: Oregon national guardsmen intervene in the beating of bound prisoners on the grounds of the Iraqi Interior Ministry; are told to back off and let the newly "sovereign" Iraqis run their own affairs.

=== July 2004 ===
The International Red Cross reports that more than 100 children were kept in six different prisons of the coalition. Witnesses say US forces also abused children and youths. Soldier Samuel Provance from Abu Ghraib reported the harassment of a 15- to 16-year-old girl in her cell as well as a 16-year-old boy who was driven through the cold after he had been showered and who was then covered with mud. Allegations have been made that children have been subjected to torture and rape. This has been used to make detained parents talk in cases where other interrogation methods have failed. Seymour Hersh told a San Francisco audience: "what happened is that those women who were arrested with young boys, children, in cases that have been [video] recorded, the boys were sodomized, with the cameras rolling... the worst above all of them is the soundtrack of the boys shrieking." An unpublished UNICEF report is said to include statements about children that were arrested in Basra and Kerbela and routinely detained in Umm Kasr. The children are said to be without contact to their families and cannot expect a trial.

=== August 2004 ===
Death penalty "reluctantly" reinstated in Iraq "until stability [is] restored."

=== December 2004 ===
Reports of mock executions by the US Marines in Iraq have surfaced in December 2004, as the ACLU published internal documents of the Naval Criminal Investigative Service (NCIS) obtained through the Freedom of Information Act. The documents were written seven weeks after the publication of the photographs which triggered the Abu Ghraib prisoner abuse scandal.

Several torture cases were also reported, notably torture by electricity, beatings, and sprayings of prisoners with fire extinguishers.

On 21 December, the ACLU released further documents documenting tortures. Notably, in a case of shooting of suspects without warning, Army commanders are reported to have interfered with the investigation. Procedures of autopsy of detainees who died in unclear circumstances have been canceled by battalion and group commands. Other cases include

- An apparent attempt by a soldier in Baghdad to force a detainee to hold a gun to create the appearance of a justifiable homicide.
- Two mock executions of Iraqi juveniles by Army personnel (documents obtained by the ACLU two weeks ago showed that U.S. Marines had also conducted a mock execution of juvenile detainees).
- Allegations of a competition among Army dog handlers at Abu Ghraib prison to see who could make Iraqi detainees urinate themselves the fastest.
- The use of death threats during interrogations. Command failures in providing appropriate training to military interrogators in Baghdad detention facilities.

=== January 2005 ===
On 24 January 2005, the ACLU accused the Pentagon of deliberately closing investigations over Human Rights violations and torture cases before they were over.

Human Rights Watch accused Iraqi security forces of using torture and improper treatments on prisoners. Arbitrary arrests and long periods of isolation are now common. Human Right Watch interviewed 90 prisoners, among which 72 said they had been tortured during interrogation. Sarah Leah Whitson, HRW director, said that the Iraqi provisional government was not holding to its promise to stand by Human Rights: "A new Iraqi government requires more than a change of leadership - it requires a change of attitude about basic human dignity".

"During the first three days there was continuous torture. I was beaten with an aluminum rod and with cables. ? Then I was told to sign a statement with my hands tied behind my back, so I didn't even see the paper and I don't know what I signed."

Among bad treatments were such elements as beatings with cables, electric shocks, including on genitals, being tied and blindfolded for days, cells so crowded that it is only possible to stand, arbitrary detention, refusal of trials, access to lawyers or contacts with families. These treatments were inflicted to insurgents and criminals alike.

=== May 2005 ===
A Pentagon order is mentioned in a military report filed on May 16, 2005 ordering U.S. personnel to turn a blind eye to Iraqi torture by refraining from investigating instances of apparent detainee abuse by Iraqi personnel, unless the investigation is first approved by U.S. headquarters: "Provided the initial report confirms US forces were not involved in the detainee abuse, no further investigation will be conducted unless directed by HHQ." Such approval was rarely granted.

=== September 2005 ===
In a report published by Human Rights Watch in September 2005, U.S. Troops are accused to routinely torture prisoners in Iraq. Two sergeants and a captain describe e.g. the breaking of a detainee’s leg, and applying chemical substances to detainees’ skin and eyes. Capt. Ian Fishback of the 82nd Airborne who made persistent efforts over 17 months to raise concerns about detainee abuse with his chain of command was consistently told to ignore abuses and to “consider your career.” When he made an appointment with Senate staff members of Senators John McCain and John Warner, he says his commanding officer denied him a pass to leave his base.

=== November 2005 ===
-173 detainees found in an Iraqi government bunker in Baghdad were found starved, beaten and tortured.

-Colin Powell's former Chief of Staff, Colonel Lawrence Wilkerson, stated in an interview with Amy Goodman on November 22 that:

"the difficulties [our troops face] come from the two decisions that I had the most insight into that were made in this more or less alternative decision-making process. And those two decisions were the inept and incompetent planning for post-invasion Iraq, and [...] the decision... from that alternative decision-making process to depart from the Geneva Conventions and from international law, in general.

"[The President's memorandum said] the spirit of Geneva would be adhered to... consistent with military necessity. [...] It did not say 'consistent with national security demands.' It did not say 'consistent with the demands of the war on terror.' It said 'consistent with military needs.' Now, military needs are very simple and clear to a man like me who spent 31 years in the military. It means that if one of my buddy's life is threatened or my life is threatened, I can take drastic action. I can even shoot a detainee. And I can expect not to be punished under Geneva, or at least if I am court-martialed, I have a defense. It doesn't mean that I can take a detainee in a cold, dark cell in Bagram, Afghanistan, for example, in December 2002, shackled to the wall, and pour cold water on him at intervals when the outside temperature is 50 degrees anyway, and eventually kill him, which is what happened."

The Haditha killings occurred on November 19 in the town of Haditha, Iraq. A convoy of United States Marines was attacked with an improvised explosive device which killed Lance Corporal Miguel Terrazas. Up to twenty-four Iraqis were subsequently killed; it is alleged that they were non-combatant local residents who were massacred by Marines in the aftermath of the insurgent attack.

=== December 2005 ===
John Pace, human rights chief for the United Nations Assistance Mission in Iraq (UNAMI), told Reuters that there were an estimated 14,000 people being held in prison in Iraq contrary to UN Resolution 1546, according to which the US government claims legal permission to occupy Iraq. In a December 5, 2005, interview, Pace said,

"All [prisoners in Iraq] except those held by the Ministry of Justice are, technically speaking, held against the law because the Ministry of Justice is the only authority that is empowered by law to detain, to hold anybody in prison.

"Essentially none of these people have any real recourse to protection and therefore we speak ... of a total breakdown in the protection of the individual in this country.

"It's very rare to get judges ordering you to be released and effectively the police respecting that order.

"We have cases also where the judge who has ordered a group of people to be released, about 50-60 people, and the police, the Interior Ministry simply refuses.

"We have another case in another part of the country where the judge was actually the subject of reprisal for having found people not getting, as ordered, their release.

"The judge is now in jail.

"The judiciary has a lot to answer for in this country. It is really not carrying out its duties," he said, adding that bribes were sometimes paid for jobs in the judiciary and police.

"This is not denied," Pace said. "This is symptomatic of the corruption problems in this country and stands in the way of any kind of rule of law."

=== June 2006 ===
According to the Iraqi Defense Ministry, Private First Class Thomas Tucker and Private First Class Kristian Menchaca were reportedly "killed in a barbaric way," "slaughtered," and tortured to death, and their bodies were so mutilated that DNA tests are being performed to help identify their remains. The alleged group has said it was a revenge for the rape and murder of an Iraqi girl who was dishonoured by soldiers of the same brigade.

Video of the killing of four Russian diplomats kidnapped in Iraq appear on the Internet. A group called the Mujahideen Shura Council released the hostage video.

=== October 2009 ===
In 2009, an additional 21 color photographs surfaced, showing prisoners in Afghanistan and Iraq being abused by their U.S. captors. The American Civil Liberties Union (ACLU) said, "[T]he government had long argued that the abuse at Abu Ghraib was isolated and was an aberration. The new photos would show that the abuse was more widespread." President Barack Obama initially indicated he would not fight the release of the photographs, but "reversed course in May and authorized an appeal to the high court." "The Obama administration believe[d] giving the imminent grant of authority over the release of such pictures to the defense secretary would short-circuit a lawsuit filed by the American Civil Liberties Union under the Freedom of Information Act." On Oct 10, 2009 the US "Congress [was] set to allow the Pentagon to keep new pictures ... from the public"

=== 2010 ===
On February 3, 2010, David A. Larson, an elected official in California who has a relationship with government contract personnel, made disclosures to the U.S. Department of Defense (DOD), Office of the Inspector General (OIG) alleging that under the Bush Administration, prisoners detained at Abu Ghraib, Guantanamo Bay, and undisclosed "black sites" were being used as involuntary research subjects for human biomedical experimentation, behavior modification research, and drug-testosterone delivery in a manner similar to past CIA Project MKULTRA activities investigated in 1977 by Senators Kennedy and Inuoye. The allegation supports information contained in an International Red Cross report relative to the expanded role of CIA medical personnel in torture and interrogation.

In 2010, the last of the prisons were turned over to the Iraqi government to run. An Associated Press article said

Despite Abu Ghriab- or perhaps because of reforms in its wake- prisoners have more recently said they receive far better treatment in American custody than in Iraqi jails.

In September 2010 Amnesty International warned in a report titled New Order, Same Abuses; Unlawful Detentions and Torture in Iraq that up to 30,000 prisoners, including many veterans of the US detention system, remain detained without rights in Iraq and are frequently tortured or abused. Furthermore, it describes a detention system that has not evolved since Saddam Hussein's regime, in which human rights abuses were endemic with arbitrary arrests and secret detention common and a lack of accountability throughout the security forces. Amnesty's Middle East and North Africa director, Malcolm Smart went on to say that "Iraq's security forces have been responsible for systematically violating detainees' rights and they have been permitted. US authorities, whose own record on detainees' rights has been so poor, have now handed over thousands of people detained by US forces to face this catalogue of illegality, violence and abuse, abdicating any responsibility for their human rights."

On October 22, 2010 nearly 400,000 secret United States army field reports and war logs, detailing torture, summary executions and war crimes, were passed on to the British paper, the Guardian and several other international media organisations through the whistleblowing website WikiLeaks. Among others, the logs detail how US authorities failed to investigate hundreds of reports of abuse, torture, rape and even murder by Iraqi police and soldiers, whose conduct appears to be systematic and normally unpunished and that US troops abused prisoners for years even after the Abu Ghraib scandal. Both the UK and the US have condemned the unauthorised release of classified material, but did not question its accuracy.

In July 2019, the Euro-Mediterranean Human Rights Monitor and the Iraqi Centre for the Documentation of War Crimes released a joint statement in which they revealed testimonies from the Taji Prison in the north of Bagdad. The testimonies documented the Iraqi security forces' policies of humiliation and persecution against detainees in Iraqi prisons, where they are kept in a large camp, suffering harsh conditions, beaten, exploited, and deprived of their basic human rights.

=== Investigations ===
Several sets of investigations, both congressional via the Senate Armed Services Committee, military via courts-martial, and criminal for non-military contractors, were launched in response to the scandal.

Seymour Hersh, who exposed the Abu Ghraib scandal, and reports in Newsweek, has taken the case even further. In 2003, Donald Rumsfeld instituted a policy that "encouraged physical coercion and sexual humiliation of Iraqi prisoners in an effort to generate more intelligence about the growing insurgency in Iraq.". This policy stemmed from an earlier policy taken toward al-Qaeda prisoners. A memo to the Bush White House from counsel Alberto Gonzales claimed that the new sort of war renders the Geneva Conventions' limitations on interrogating enemy prisoners "obsolete". The program was approved by the CIA, NSA, and the National Security Council. President George W. Bush was informed of it. The Under Secretary of Defense for Intelligence Steven Cambone administered the operation. His deputy, William Boykin, instructed the head of operations at Camp X-ray Maj. Gen. Geoffrey Miller to do the same at Abu Ghraib. Miller told Brig. Gen. Janis Karpinski that the prison would now be dedicated to gathering intelligence. Douglas Feith and William Haynes were also involved in the operation.

On May 18, 2004, a military intelligence analyst named Samuel Provance came out to the press, stating "There's definitely a cover-up". Provance, who ran a computer network used by military intelligence in the prison and who had been ordered not to speak to the press, told ABC News "Anything [the MPs] were to do legally or otherwise, they were to take those commands from the interrogators," and that the sexual humiliation began as a technique ordered by the investigators. He described several of the goings-on in the prison that he witnessed, such as the punching people in the neck hard enough to knock them unconscious after assuring them they weren't going to be hit, in order to catch them off guard. He also stated that Maj. Gen. George Fay, the Army's deputy chief of staff for intelligence, has shown little interest in investigating the interrogators and has gone only after the MPs, and that there is a culture of silence right now among those involved, who fear that if they say anything, the investigations will turn to them.

On May 19, 2004, a court martial hearing was held for Cpl. Charles A. Graner Jr., who has been accused of being the ringleader of the group employing torture at Abu Ghraib. In an unexpected move, all three key witnesses - Lt. Col. Steven L. Jordan, Capt. Donald J. Reese, and contractor Adel L. Nakhla - refused to testify. This is an almost unheard of action. Under court martial proceedings, one cannot refuse to testify unless they have a belief that they will be exposed to criminal charges for doing so. Consequently, it is likely that the investigative proceedings will be forced to move higher up the chain of command.

== See also ==
- United Nations Convention Against Torture
