= Taguba =

Taguba may refer to:

- Antonio Taguba (born 1950), Filipino-American United States Army general
- Taguba Report, Antonio Taguba's report into the Abu Ghraib torture and prisoner abuse scandals
- TAGUBA, a group of Amazonian warriors from the Filipino television series Mulawin
