= Donald J. Ryder =

U.S. Army major general

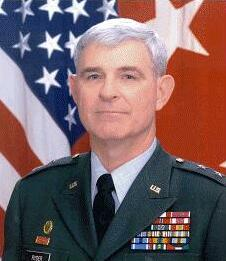
- Major General Donald J. Ryder c. 2003
- Military career
- Allegiance: United States
- Branch: United States Army
- Service years: 1971–2006
- Rank: Major General
- Commands: United States Army Provost Marshal General; United States Army Criminal Investigation Command
- Conflicts: Gulf War; Iraq War
- Awards: Army Distinguished Service Medal; Legion of Merit (3); Bronze Star Medal

Donald Ryder is a retired major general of the United States Army who served as United States Army Provost Marshal General from 2003 to 2006.

== Biography ==
Ryder was commissioned into the United States Army in 1971. He was promoted to major general in 2001. He served as the most senior officer in the Criminal Investigation Division and was also the top Army Law Enforcement officer as the Army Provost Marshal General.

=== Taguba Report ===
In 2003, Ryder conducted an inquiry into the abuse of prisoners in Iraq, cited in the Taguba Report. Some of the key recommendations of Ryder's report were directly contrary to the recommendations of Major General Geoffrey Miller, formerly the commander of Camp Delta.

Ryder recommended that the duties of the military police who guarded detainees be strictly separated from the duties of the Military Intelligence officers who interrogated them.

General Miller had urged closer cooperation between guards and interrogators. Miller had recommended that guards "set the conditions" for successful interrogation—a vague term that some critics believe was the trigger for some of the abuse some guards later committed. Secretary of Defense Donald Rumsfeld's response to the public release of the news of the Abu Ghraib torture and prisoner abuse was to ignore Ryder and Taguba's recommendations and appoint General Miller to take over the direction of the prison facilities in Iraq. Ryder also oversaw the organization and operations of the DoD Criminal Investigation Task Force (CITF), which conducted terrorism investigations. Ryder retired in 2007.

== Awards and decorations ==
During his military career, he was awarded the Distinguished Service Medal, the Legion of Merit with two oak leaf clusters, the Bronze Star Medal, the Meritorious Service Medal with oak leaf cluster, Army Commendation Medal with three oak leaf clusters, the Southwest Asia Service Medal with two campaign stars, the Armed Forces Service Medal, the Humanitarian Service Medal, and the NATO Medal.
