= Ming Chang =

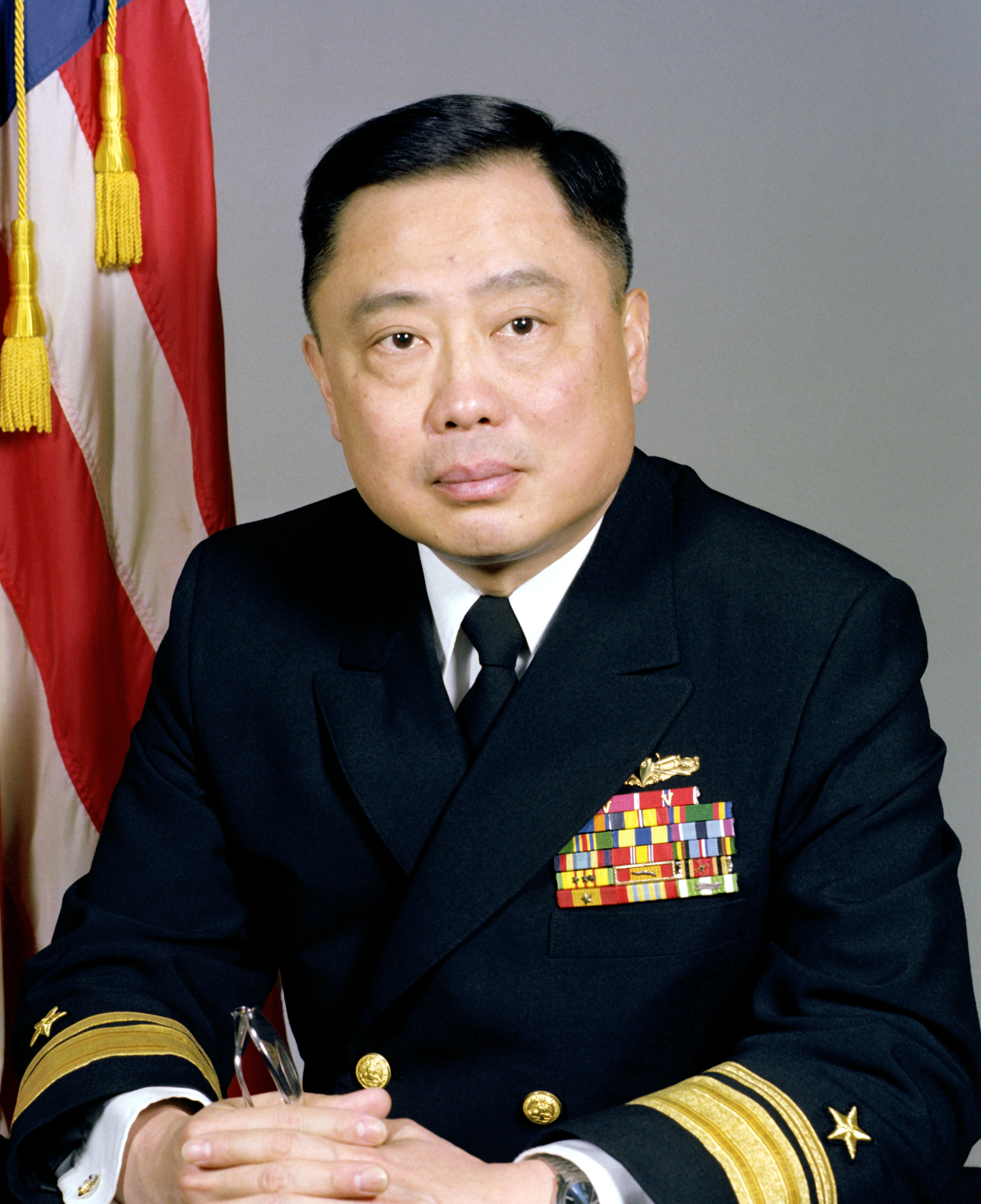
- Born: 20 April 1932; Shanghai, China
- Died: 3 October 2017 (aged 85); McLean, Virginia, U.S.
- Education: College of William & Mary (BS); Naval Postgraduate School (BS); Industrial College of the Armed Forces
- Spouse: Charlotte Yu-Jen Chung
- Children: 2
- Relatives: Connie Chung Sister Inlaw
- Military career
- Allegiance: United States
- Branch: United States Navy; Naval Reserve
- Service years: 1955–1960 (reserve); 1960–1990 (active)
- Rank: Rear Admiral
- Commands: Naval Inspector General; Cruiser-Destroyer Group 2 USS Reeves (CG-24); USS Rathburne (FF-1057)
- Conflicts: Vietnam War
- Awards: Legion of Merit (2); Bronze Star (Combat "V")
- Other work: Raytheon (vice president); MEC (president)

Ming Erh Chang (Note: simplified Chinese: 钱勇杰; traditional Chinese: 錢勇傑; pinyin: Qián Yǒngjié) (20 April 1932 – 3 October 2017) was an American rear admiral who last served as Naval Inspector General from 1987 until his retirement in 1990. He became the first naturalized Asian American naval officer to reach flag rank in the United States military. After Chang retired from naval service, he was the vice president and corporate director for the Pacific region at Raytheon International and then president of MEC International, LLC.

Chang enlisted in the United States Naval Reserve in 1955 and received his officer's commission in 1957, before beginning active service in the United States Navy in 1960. During his career, he was deployed on the ground during the Vietnam War with U.S. Naval Forces Vietnam, and later commanded a destroyer, a cruiser, and a cruiser-destroyer group. His awards included the Bronze Star with valor. Chang held degrees in the fields of physics and engineering from the College of William & Mary, the Naval Postgraduate School, and the Industrial College of the Armed Forces.

== Early life and education ==
Ming Erh Chang was born on 20 April 1932 in Shanghai, and was the son of Yu Ching Chang, who became a chief petty officer of the United States Navy. Ming Chang graduated from the College of William & Mary in 1955 with a bachelor of science degree in physics and then enlisted in the United States Naval Reserve, beginning his service on 13 November 1955. He was commissioned as an ensign in the Naval Reserve on 30 September 1957. Chang later received a bachelor of science in electronics engineering in 1962 at the Naval Postgraduate School, and graduated from the Industrial College of the Armed Forces in 1974.

== Naval career ==
While in the Naval Reserve, Chang served on the USS Lexington from April 1956 to February 1958, and on the staff of the commander, United States Seventh Fleet, until May 1960. He was promoted to lieutenant junior grade on 30 July 1958. He entered active service in May 1960, and after completing his studies at the Naval Postgraduate School in June 1962, Chang served on USS Rigel until February 1964. Chang attended the Naval Guided Missiles School from February to June 1964, and then served as a weapons officer on USS Belknap until July 1966. He was promoted to lieutenant on 1 March 1965. Following that assignment, he was an assistant project officer for digital systems at the Anti-Air Warfare Systems Directorate, Naval Ordnance Systems Command, until April 1969.

He was the executive officer of USS Hollister from April 1969 to October 1970, and was promoted to lieutenant commander on 1 September 1969. He served as assistant chief of staff for administration, U.S. Naval Forces Vietnam, Military Assistance Command, Vietnam, from October 1970 to April 1971. He was the director for administration of the Naval Support Activity Saigon from April to July 1971, and assistant senior advisor to Amphibious Task Force 211 until December 1971. Chang was later the commanding officer of USS Rathburne, from February 1972 to June 1973. He attended the Industrial College of the Armed Forces, and then from June 1974 served as head of the Anti-Submarine Warfare Branch on the chief of naval operations staff until February 1977. Promoted to commander on 1 March 1977, Chang served as commanding officer of USS Reeves from February 1977 to July 1979.

Chang was the chief of staff of Carrier Group 3 from July 1979 to August 1980 and chief of staff of the U.S. Third Fleet from August 1980 to September 1981. That month he was promoted to captain. On 1 December 1982, Chang was promoted to rear admiral, while he served as director of the Tactical Air Surface and Electronic Warfare Development Division on the chief of naval operations staff, from September 1981 to February 1983. He commanded Cruiser-Destroyer Group 2 from February 1983 to July 1985. Chang was then the deputy commander, Weapons and Combat Systems, Naval Sea Systems Command, until June 1987, when he became the Naval Inspector General. He remained in that office until his retirement from the Navy on 1 September 1990. In retirement, he was the vice president and corporate director for the Pacific Region at Raytheon and the president of MEC International, LLC.

Ming Chang became the first naturalized Asian American naval officer to reach flag rank. He died on October 3, 2017, from complications of Parkinson's disease. Admiral Chang was interred at Arlington National Cemetery on March 7, 2018.

== Awards and recognition ==
Legion of Merit (two awards); Bronze Star Medal with Combat "V"; Air Medal with Numeral "3"; Combat Action Ribbon; Navy Unit Commendation (awarded U.S. Naval Forces, Vietnam); Meritorious Unit Commendation (awarded USS Rathburne); Navy Expeditionary Medal (Iran/Indian Ocean); National Defense Service Medal; Armed Forces Expeditionary Medal (Cuba) with two Bronze Stars (Taiwan and Korea); Federal Republic of Germany Cross of Merit; First Class of the Order of Merit Republic of Vietnam Armed Forces; Honor Medal First Class Republic of Vietnam; Gallantry Cross with Bronze Star; Vietnam Service Medal with three Bronze Stars; Republic of Vietnam Meritorious Unit Citation (Gallantry Cross Color); Republic of Vietnam Campaign Medal.

Norman Mineta recounted: "And this isn't a question of being politically correct. it's a question of decency. I mean, why is it that we are considered foreign? It just blows my mind. I remember when Admiral Ming Chang got a call from a reporter one day, and he was recounting that the reporter asked him if he was a U.S. citizen. He says, Yes he was. 'Were you born here?' 'No, I came to the United States in 1950 [sic] (actually 1946) as a young boy from Shanghai.' 'And so, what did you do to get your citizenship?' 'And he says, 'I was naturalized.' 'What proof do you have of your citizenship?' 'He says, 'Well, young man, I served for 33 years in the United States Navy and came out a Rear Admiral, and I am now a very high ranking officer of the Raytheon International Corporation.'"

== See also ==
- Military history of Asian Americans

== Notes ==
Military offices
| Preceded by John H. Fetterman Jr. | Naval Inspector General of the United States Navy; 1987–1990 | Succeeded by George W. Davis VI |
