= USS Excel (AM-439) =

Minesweeper of the United States Navy

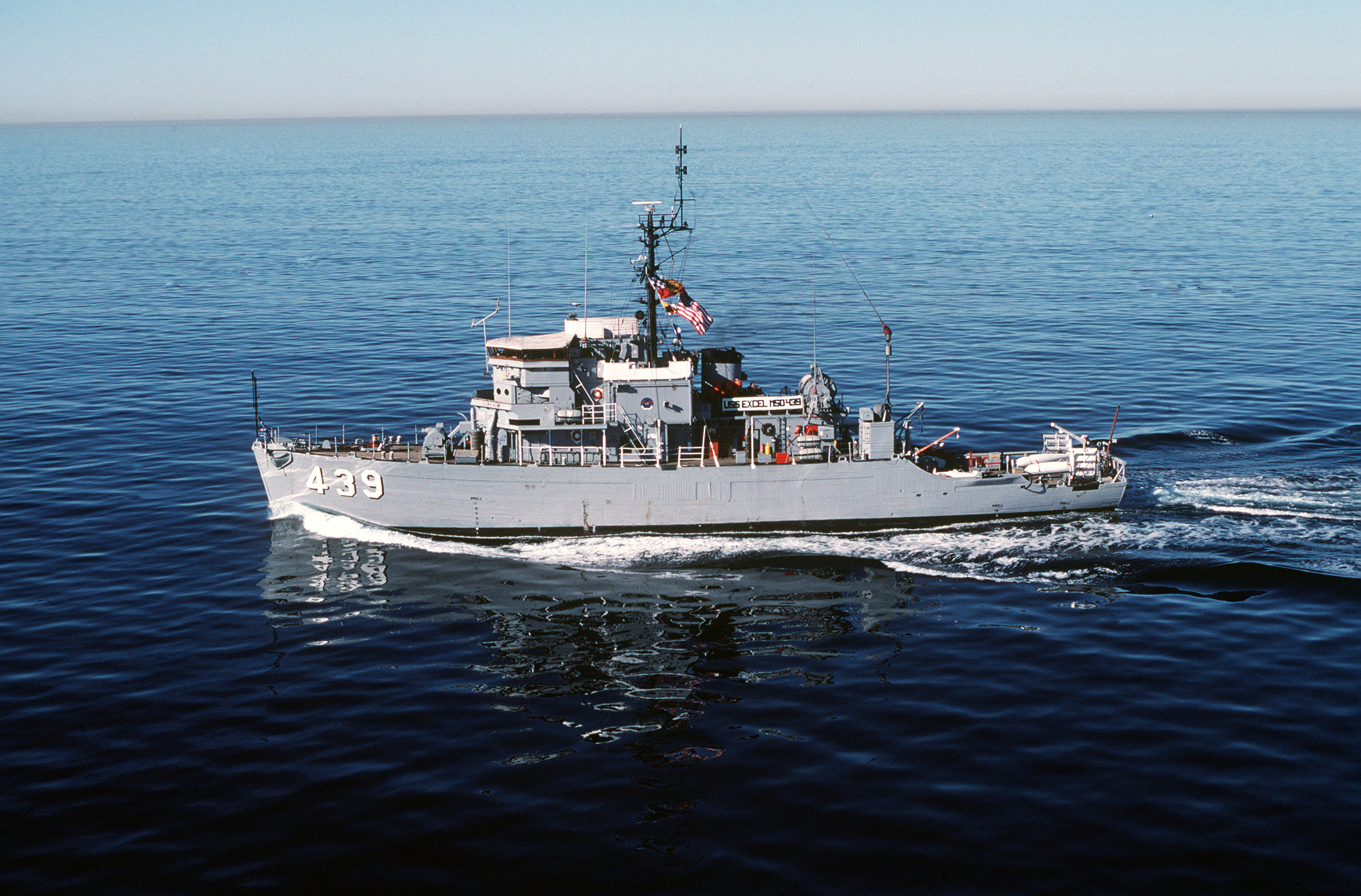

History

United States
- Name: USS Excel (AM-439) (MSO-439)
- Builder: Higgins Corp., New Orleans, Louisiana
- Laid down: 9 February 1953
- Launched: 25 September 1953
- Commissioned: 24 February 1955
- Decommissioned: 30 September 1992
- Reclassified: MSO-439 7 February 1955
- Stricken: 28 March 1994
- Honours and awards: Armed Forces Expeditionary Medal, Vietnam Service Medal, Secretary of the Navy Letter of Commendation, Secretary of the Navy Energy Conservation Award, Navy Reserve Sea Service Deployment Ribbon, Minesweeping "M" Excellence Award
- Fate: Sold for scrap, 2000

General characteristics
- Class & type: Agile-class minesweeper
- Displacement: 775 tons
- Length: 172 ft (52.43 m)
- Beam: 36 ft (10.97 m)
- Draught: 10 ft (3.05 m)
- Propulsion: Four Packard ID1700 diesel engines, replaced by four Waukasha Motors Co. diesels, two shafts, two controllable pitch propellers.
- Speed: 14 knots (26 km/h)
- Complement: 74
- Armament: 1 40 mm., 2 .50 cal (12.7 mm) mg

USS Excel (MSO-439) was an Agile-class minesweeper: laid down, 9 February 1953 as AM-439 at the Higgins Corp., New Orleans, Louisiana; launched, 25 September 1953; reclassified an Ocean Minesweeper (non-magnetic) MSO-439, 7 February 1955; commissioned USS Excel (MSO-439), 24 February 1955.

== West Coast operations ==
USS Excel arrived at Long Beach, California, her home port, 4 June 1955, and began operating along the west coast in training and exercises. In 1956, and again in 1959, she served in the Far East with the U.S. 7th Fleet, visiting Japan, the Philippines, Hong Kong, Korea, and Taiwan, and exercising with ships of friendly navies. Through 1960 she continued to sail out of Long Beach, California, for operations and cruises along the west coast.

Minediv 93 went on a WesPac during the summer of 1961. On 27 August 1961, Commander Mine Division 93, with ocean minesweepers USS Leader (MSO 490) and USS Excel (MSO 439), made the first official visit by ships of the US Navy to Phnom Penh, the capital of Cambodia. The only time US Navy ships visited the capital until USS Gary visited in February 2007.

During the Vietnam war USS Excel was involved in Operation Market Time which interdicted arms smuggling from North Vietnam to the many rivers and estuaries of South Vietnam by everything that could float, now considered the most successful naval operation of the Vietnam war, although it led to the vast improvement of the Ho Chi Minh trail.

USS Excel was sent to the reserve fleet in the 1970s and was sent to its new home port, Treasure Island in the middle of San Francisco Bay.

Rear Admiral Albert T. Church III served as captain of USS Excel during the late 1970s when he was a lieutenant commander.

Captain Gerald F. Deconto was the Engineering Officer of Excel during the early 1980s when he was a newly graduated ensign; Deconto was killed at the Pentagon on 11 September 2001.

== Decommissioning ==
USS Excel was decommissioned, 30 September 1992; struck from the Naval Register, 28 March 1994; laid up in the Reserve Fleet; sold for scrapping to Crowley Marine, January 2000.
