= Naval Inspector General =

Inspector General of the U.S. Department of the Navy

United States Navy Naval Inspector General
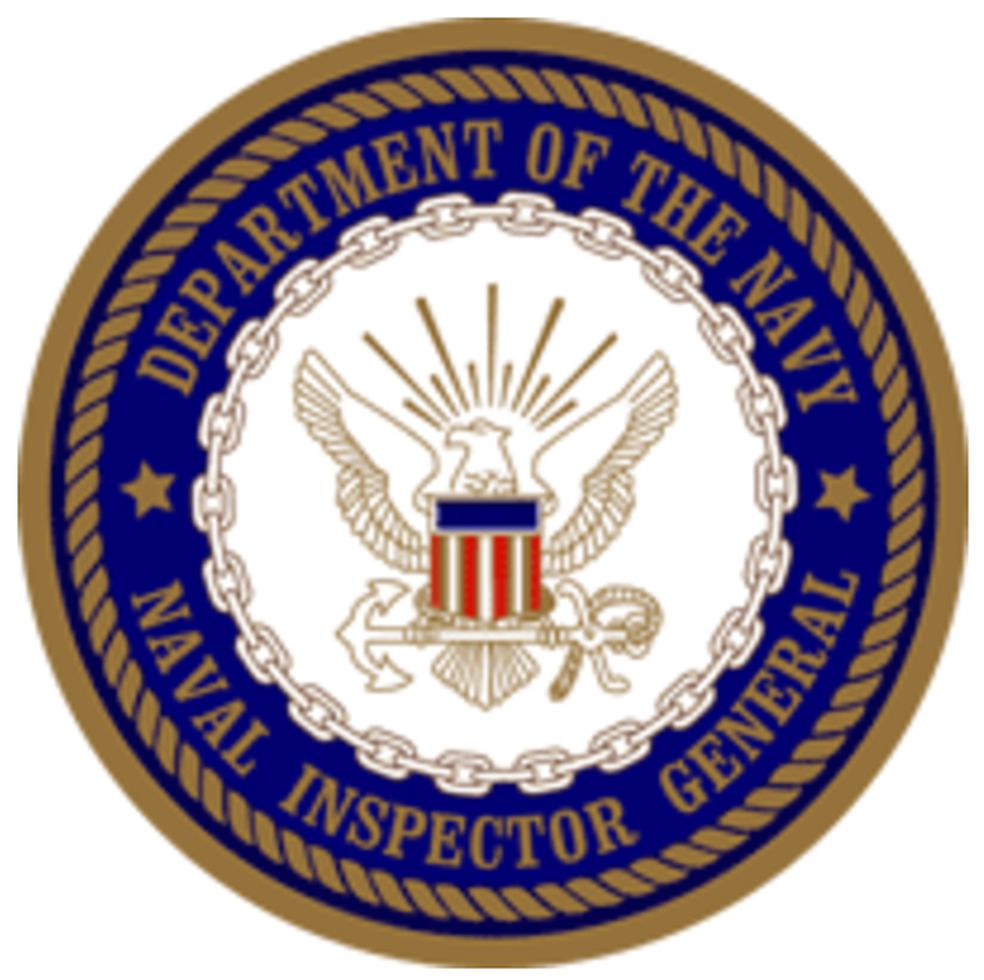

- Flag of a Navy vice admiral

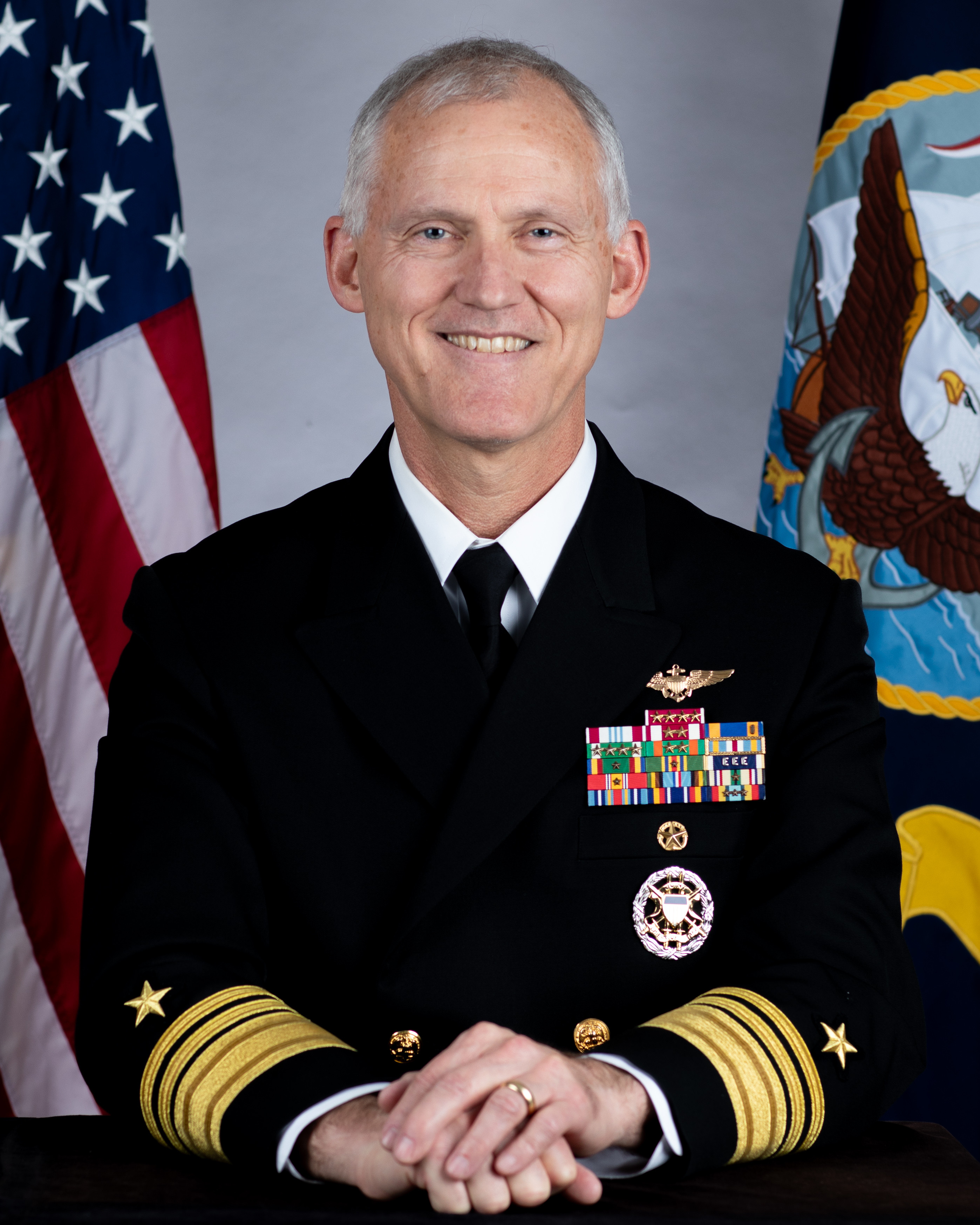
- Incumbent; Vice Admiral M. Wayne Baze since 30 October 2025
- Formation: June 1942
- First holder: Charles P. Snyder
- Website: www.secnav.navy.mil/ig/

The Office of Naval Inspector General for the United States Department of the Navy was established during World War II to make investigations as directed by the secretary of the Navy and the chief of naval operations. The current mission of the naval inspector general is "to inspect, investigate, or inquire into matters of importance to the Department of the Navy and maintain the highest level of public confidence".

== History ==
In February 1942, while undergoing conversion in New York harbor, USS Lafayette caught fire and subsequently capsized. In addition to one person being killed in the disaster, the loss of such a prestigious and well-known ship was a tremendous embarrassment to the Navy. Congress launched an investigation into the disaster to determine if the ship's loss was an act of foreign sabotage or merely negligence. In its report, Congress expressed frustration with the multiple investigative agencies within the Navy. The committee felt that the Navy Department needed an office of Inspector General to "be charged with the duty of keeping Congress and the secretary of the Navy informed as to the conditions of the naval service.

Secretary of the Navy Frank Knox established the Office of Naval Inspector General (NIG) on 18 May 1942 with General Order 173. Initially, the naval inspector general was part of the staff of the commander in chief, United States Fleet. The initial staff included one deputy and three assistant inspectors. The office served throughout World War II as a 'troubleshooting' unit for the chief of naval operations (CNO) by conducting inquiries and reporting on all matters which affected the efficiency and economy of the Navy; and by conducting inspections and investigations into any naval matter as required by the secretary of the Navy, CNO, Congress, or by law.

The Goldwater-Nichols Act in 1986 transferred the NIG from the Office of the Chief of Naval Operations to the Office of the Secretary of the Navy.

== List of naval inspectors general ==
- Admiral Charles P. Snyder, 18 May 1942–April 1946
- Vice Admiral Charles A. Lockwood, April 1946–July 1947
- Rear Admiral Leo Hewlett Thebaud, July 1947-June 1949
- Rear Admiral Allan Rockwell McCann, June 1949-February 1950
- Rear Admiral H. S. Kendall, February 1950-June 1952
- Rear Admiral James C. Jones, September 1952-March 1954
- Vice Admiral Stuart S. Murray, April 1954-August 1956
- Vice Admiral Roscoe H. Hillenkoetter, August 1956-April 1957
- Rear Admiral Burton B. Biggs, May 1957- September 1958
- Rear Admiral John W. Ailes III, October 1958-November 1961
- Rear Admiral Alfred R. Matter, November 1961-September 1962
- Rear Admiral Glynn R. Donaho, September 1962-August 1963
- Captain J. C. Kelly, September 1963-November 1963
- Rear Admiral G. S. Patrick, November 1963-June 1964
- Captain J. C. Kelly, June 1964-September 1964
- Rear Admiral Frederick J. Becton, September 1964-September 1965
- Vice Admiral Ray Cannon Needham, September 1965-May 1969
- Vice Admiral Arthur R. Gralla, May 1969-February 1970
- Vice Admiral John A. Tyree, February 1970-November 1971
- Vice Admiral Means Johnston Jr., November 1971-November 1973
- Rear Admiral B. H. Shepherd, November 1973-July 1975
- Rear Admiral Martin D. Carmody, July 1975-July 1977
- Rear Admiral Stanley J. Anderson, July 1977-July 1980
- Rear Admiral Daniel G. McCormick III, August 1980-October 1981
- Rear Admiral Edward W. Carter III, November 1981-August 1982
- Rear Admiral Henry C. Mustin, September 1982-August 1984
- Rear Admiral Jerry O. Tuttle, September 1984-October 1985
- Rear Admiral John H. Fetterman Jr., November 1985-June 1987
- Rear Admiral Ming Chang, July 1987-September 1990
- Rear Admiral George W. Davis VI, September 1990-November 1992
- Vice Admiral David M. Bennett, November 1992-August 1995
- Vice Admiral James R. Fitzgerald, September 1995-July 1997
- Vice Admiral Lee F. Gunn, July 1997-August 2000
- Vice Admiral Michael D. Haskins, August 2000-January 2003
- Vice Admiral Albert T. Church III, March 2003-August 2004
- Vice Admiral Ronald A. Route, August 2004- November 2007
- Vice Admiral Anthony L. Winns November 2007- 18 April 2011
- Vice Admiral James P. Wisecup, 18 April 2011 - 5 September 2013
- Vice Admiral James F. Caldwell Jr., 5 September 2013 – 15 May 2015
- Vice Admiral Herman A. Shelanski, 15 May 2015 – 1 August 2018
- Vice Admiral Richard P. Snyder, 1 August 2018 – 11 June 2021
- Vice Admiral John V. Fuller, 11 June 2021 – 30 October 2025
- Vice Admiral M. Wayne Baze, 30 October 2025 – present

== See also ==
- Tailhook scandal
- General Counsel of the Navy
- Judge Advocate General of the Navy
