= Albert T. Church =

Tom Church
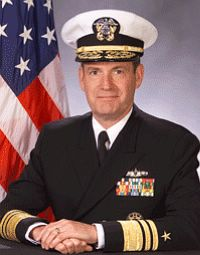
- Born: Albert Thomas Church III; 1947 (age 78–79); Newport, Rhode Island, U.S.
- Education: U.S. Naval Academy
- Occupations: President, Church Group LLC
- Years active: 1969–2005
- Known for: Vice Admiral (Retired). Former United States Navy Inspector General and author of the Church Report that reviewed detainee interrogations during the Iraq War and War in Afghanistan (2001–2021).

Albert Thomas Church III (born 1947) is a retired vice admiral in the United States Navy. Church served as on active duty for 36 years, retiring as a vice admiral in 2005. During his service he commanded two warships, the Navy's largest shore installation at Naval Station Norfolk, Virginia, and was the longest-serving budget director of the Navy (1998–2002). Church also served as the Naval Inspector General, during which time he completed a comprehensive review of interrogation techniques used by the Department of Defense in Iraq, Afghanistan, and at Guantanamo Bay, Cuba. He is currently President of The Church Group, LLC.

== Early life and education ==
Admiral Church was born in 1947, in Newport, Rhode Island. His father, Albert T. Church Jr. (U.S. Naval Academy Class of 1938) was a career naval officer, as were his uncle and both grandfathers. His grandfather, Albert T. Church I, was a roommate of Chester W. Nimitz of World War II fame, while at the U.S. Naval Academy. The Church family is originally from Idaho; Vice Admiral Church is a first cousin once removed of the late Senator Frank Church (D – Idaho), who was an outspoken critic of the Vietnam War and certain FBI and CIA intelligence-gathering and covert operations.

== Highlights of navy career ==
Church entered the U.S. Naval Academy in 1965, graduating 4 years later with orders to his first ship, USS Halsey (DLG-23). While serving on his second ship, USS O’Callahan (DE-1051) he was routinely on the “gun-line”, providing gunfire support to troops in Vietnam. During the course of his 36-year career he commanded two warships (a Minesweeper and Frigate) and the Navy's largest Naval Station, Naval Station Norfolk. Selected for Rear Admiral in 1998, his assignments as a Flag Officer included the staff of the Commander, U.S Pacific Fleet, the Director of Financial Management and Budget (Budget Director) for the Navy and Marine Corps, the Naval Inspector General, and completing his career as the Director of the Navy Staff. Church served 4 and ½ years as the Budget Director, the longest tenure in the position's history. Church's office and his staff were in the newest section of the Pentagon that was destroyed during the September 11 attacks, but all escaped safely from their 4th floor offices before the wedge collapsed 20 minutes after airplane impact.

== ISTF - The Church Report ==
Following the 2004 scandal at Abu Ghraib prison in Iraq, on May 25, 2004, under the direction of Secretary of Defense Donald Rumsfeld, Church assembled a team to conduct an inquiry into detainee interrogation and incarceration, in Iraq, Afghanistan, and Guantanamo Bay, Cuba. He and a small team traveled to Cuba and collectively interviewed 800 Armed Service members, as well as senior Washington policy-makers, taking sworn statements and analyzing sensitive data that had been collected.

One of the early respondents to the data collection was Alberto J. Mora, then the General Counsel of the Department of the Navy, who provided insight into the discussions that led to the authorization of harsh interrogation techniques, which were subsequently discontinued in the Department of Defense. The data gathered and many of the early conclusions also supported the Independent Panel to Review the Department of Defense Detention Operations which was chaired by the Honorable James R. Schlesinger and reported to the Secretary of Defense in August 2004. The final Church Report was issued on March 2, 2005, followed by Congressional testimony and a press conference. While much of the final report remains classified, the unclassified report that accompanied the classified version summarizes the scope of the study and the overall findings.

== Private sector work (2005–present) ==
From 2005 to 2011 Church was a principal at the government consulting and services provider Booz Allen Hamilton. In 2011 Church joined Prescient Edge Corporation, a national security services and technology contractor that provided solutions in the areas of defense, energy, infrastructure, intelligence, surveillance, and cyber security to U.S. Government agencies, foreign governments, and customers in select commercial markets. He served as President of Prescient Edge Federal from 2011 - 2015.

== Awards and medals ==
Church's personal awards and decorations include the Navy Distinguished Service Medal (two awards), Defense Superior Service Medal, Legion of Merit (three awards), Meritorious Service Medal (three awards), Navy and Marine Corps Commendation Medal, Navy and Marine Corps Achievement Medal (two awards) and the Combat Action Ribbon.

- Navy Distinguished Service Medal
- Defense Superior Service Medal
- Legion of Merit with two award stars
- Meritorious Service Medal with two award stars
- Navy and Marine Corps Commendation Medal
- Navy and Marine Corps Achievement Medal
- Combat Action Ribbon

== Partial list of postings ==
USS Excel	CO	August 1979 – October 1981
USS Fox	XO	April 1983 – April 1985
Surface Warfare Program and Budget Office (OP 30) and the General Planning and Programming Division (OP 80) of OPNAV	staff	May 1985 – October 1987
USS DeWert	CO	April 1988 – April 1990
OPNAV N81, BUPERS, Officer Plans and Career Management Division (Pers 21)	Director	
Naval Station Norfolk	CO	August 1992 – August 1994
Program and Budget Analysis Division	Chief	August 1994 – July 1996
Shore Installation Management, US Pacific Fleet	Deputy Chief of Staff	September 1996 – June 1988
Office of the Assistant Secretary of the Navy	Director, Office of Budget	July 1998 – March 2003
Office of the Chief of Naval Operations	Director, Navy Staff	March 2003 – August 2005

== See also ==
Military offices
Preceded by Michael D. Haskins	Naval Inspector General; April 2003–August 2004	Succeeded by Ronald A. Route
