= Glynn R. Donaho =

United States admiral (1905–1986)

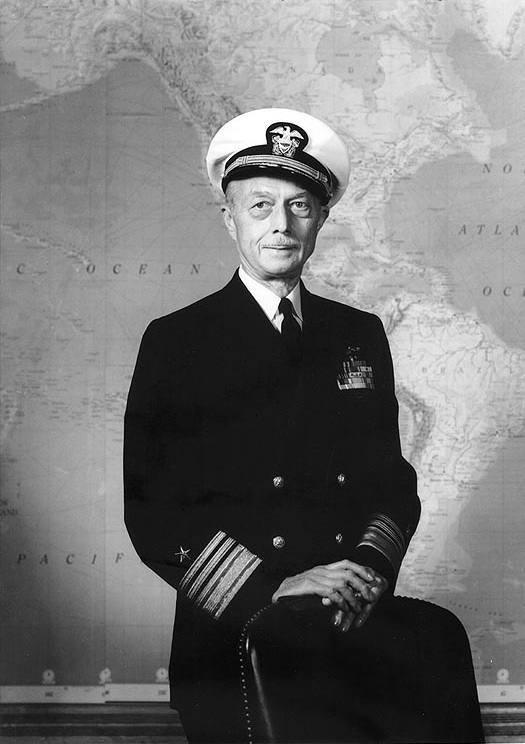
- Born: March 25, 1905; George, Texas, U.S.
- Died: May 26, 1986 (aged 81); Sierra Vista, Arizona, U.S.
- Military career
- Allegiance: United States
- Branch: United States Navy
- Service years: 1927–1967
- Rank: Vice admiral
- Nickname: "Donc"
- Commands: Military Sea Transportation Service; Destroyer Flotilla 3 Destroyer Squadron 17; Submarine Squadron 3 Submarine Division 222; USS Picuda; USS Flying Fish
- Conflicts: World War II; Korean War
- Awards: Navy Cross (4); Navy Distinguished Service Medal; Silver Star (2); Bronze Star Medal

Glynn Robert Donaho (March 25, 1905 – May 28, 1986) was a United States Navy officer who rose to the rank of vice admiral. He was known chiefly as a submarine commander in World War II, for which he received the Navy Cross four times and the Silver Star twice. He commanded USS Flying Fish on five war patrols, and in 1944 he led a coordinated attack group of submarines from USS Picuda. After the war, he testified at the court-martial of Captain Charles B. McVay III of the USS Indianapolis. He later served as Naval Inspector General and as commander of the Military Sea Transportation Service, and he retired in 1967.

== Early life and education ==
Donaho was born in George, Texas, on March 25, 1905. He graduated from the United States Naval Academy in June 1927.

== Early career ==
Donaho began his service in 1927 aboard the battleship USS California. He started submarine service in 1931, and he served as navigator of the submarines S-12, R-3 and R-13. In 1940 and 1941, he was commanding officer of the submarine R-4.

== World War II ==
=== Flying Fish ===
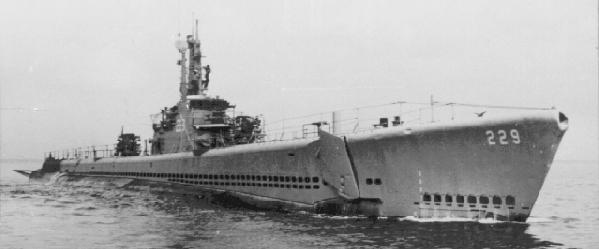
USS Flying Fish (SS-229)

In December 1941, Donaho became prospective commanding officer of the new submarine Flying Fish, and he placed her in commission on December 10, 1941. Charles W. Styer, who served under him, later described him as one of the war's best submarine captains, a strict commander who was known for pressing home his torpedo attacks. On the first war patrol, Flying Fish scored a hit on a Japanese destroyer off Taiwan on the night of July 3, 1942.

On the second patrol, north of Truk, Flying Fish sighted a Japanese battleship guarded by two destroyers and air cover. Two hits were heard by sound, but Donaho was blinded by a geyser of water thrown up by a bomb, and the submarine was then subjected to a barrage of 36 depth charges. Flying Fish later attacked a 400-ton patrol vessel, but her torpedoes failed to explode, and she sank the vessel with two more torpedoes early on September 4. Donaho's first Navy Cross citation stated that the battleship, of the Kongō class, was seen burning fiercely after the attack.

On the third patrol, Flying Fish made three attacks on Japanese task forces, but according to the Dictionary of American Naval Fighting Ships she was frustrated by poor torpedo performance. Donaho's second Navy Cross citation credited the submarine with sinking two enemy destroyers in the waters of the Solomon Islands during the patrol, which lasted from October 27 to December 16, 1942.

The fourth patrol was a reconnaissance of the Mariana Islands. Flying Fish damaged a freighter in Apra Harbor on Guam on January 26, 1943, hit a passenger-cargo ship off Tinian on February 6, and sank another freighter on February 16, despite patrolling aircraft and surface escorts. His third Navy Cross citation credited him with sinking four ships totaling 28,000 tons and damaging two others totaling 12,620 tons. On the fifth patrol, along the coasts of Honshu and Hokkaido in foul weather, Flying Fish damaged a large freighter, drove a burning inter-island cargo ship aground, and sank two more cargo ships. After five patrols, Donaho handed command of the submarine to Captain Frank T. Watkins. Donaho also received two Silver Stars for his command of Flying Fish.

=== Picuda and Submarine Division 222 ===
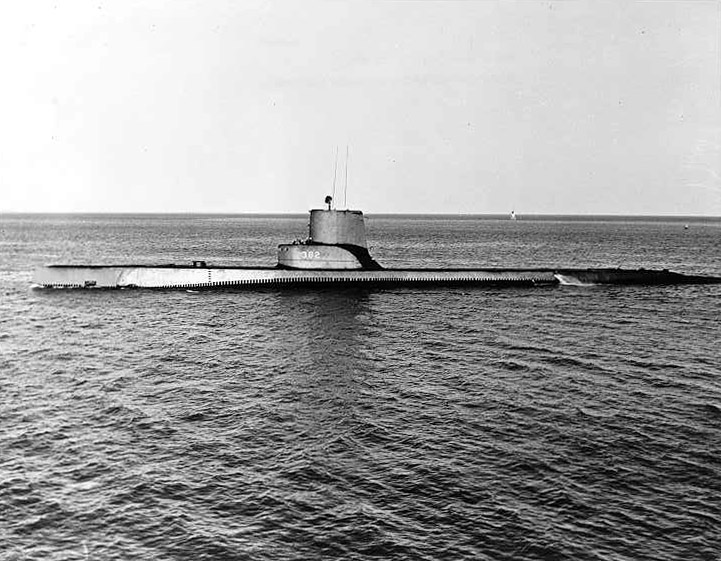
USS Picuda (SS-382)

In 1944 and part of 1945, Donaho commanded a submarine division as well as the submarine Picuda. As commander of Submarine Division 222, he contributed to the success of 18 war patrols. On July 23, 1944, Picuda left Pearl Harbor for her third war patrol, in a wolfpack with USS Spadefish and USS Redfish, bound for the Luzon Strait. Donaho commanded the patrol as the leader of the Eleventh Coordinated Attack Group.

On August 25, Picuda attacked a group of ten ships off the coast of Luzon, sinking the 1,943-ton cargo ship Kotoku Maru and the pursuing destroyer Yūnagi. On September 16, she sank the 5,975-ton cargo ship Tokushima Maru and damaged two other freighters, and on September 21 she sank the 1,948-ton freighter Awaji Maru. The patrol ended at Majuro on October 3, 1944. Donaho's fourth Navy Cross citation credited him with sinking five freighters totaling 20,000 tons and damaging a 10,000-ton transport. It also stated that the attack group he directed sank sixteen ships totaling 93,500 tons and damaged six others.

== Indianapolis court-martial ==
In December 1945, Donaho testified at the court-martial of Captain Charles B. McVay III, whose cruiser Indianapolis had been sunk by the Japanese submarine I-58 in July 1945. McVay was charged with failing to steer a zigzag course. Although Donaho was called as a prosecution witness, his testimony ultimately aided McVay's defense. According to Time, he told the court that zigzagging was "of no value" as evasive action, and that he could correct for a target's change of course within seconds. I-58's commander, Mochitsura Hashimoto, also testified that zigzagging would have made no difference to his attack. McVay was nonetheless convicted of hazarding his ship by failing to zigzag.

== Post-war career ==
After the war, Donaho served as director of the Recruiting Division of the Bureau of Naval Personnel. From 1948, he commanded Submarine Squadron 3. He then held posts dealing with United Nations matters and foreign military aid in the office of the Chief of Naval Operations. From 1953 to 1955, he commanded Destroyer Squadron 17. He then served as chief of staff and aide to the commander of the Seventh Fleet, and later commanded the U.S. Naval Base Subic Bay in the Philippines. He was promoted to rear admiral in 1957.

From September 1957 to September 1958, Donaho commanded Destroyer Flotilla Three. He then became director of the Logistics Plans Division in the Office of the Chief of Naval Operations. In September 1959, he became assistant vice chief of naval operations and director of naval administration, a post he held until 1962. He then served as the twelfth Naval Inspector General. He was promoted to vice admiral in August 1963.

In 1964, Donaho became commander of the Military Sea Transportation Service. He received the Navy Distinguished Service Medal for this command, which covered his role in the worldwide ocean delivery of supplies during the Vietnam War. He retired from active duty at the beginning of April 1967.

== Death and legacy ==
Donaho died at Sierra Vista, Arizona, on May 28, 1986. The Naval History and Heritage Command holds a collection of his photographs, covering his years at the Naval Academy, his command of Flying Fish, Destroyer Flotilla Three and the Military Sea Transportation Service. The collection also records the launching of the cargo ship American Ranger, for which his wife was the sponsor.

== Awards and decorations ==

Badge	Submarine Warfare insignia		
1st Row	Navy Cross w/ three Gold stars		
2nd Row	Navy Distinguished Service Medal	Silver Star w/ one Gold star	Bronze Star Medal
3rd Row	Navy Commendation Medal w/ one Gold star and "V" Device	Navy Unit Commendation w/ one bronze star	American Defense Service Medal w/ Atlantic Clasp
4th Row	American Campaign Medal	Asiatic-Pacific Campaign Medal w/ one silver and two bronze service stars	World War II Victory Medal
5th Row	Navy Occupation Service Medal	China Service Medal	National Defense Service Medal w/ one bronze star
6th Row	Korean Service Medal	United Nations Korea Medal	Philippine Liberation Medal

=== First Navy Cross citation ===
His official first Navy Cross citation reads:

Action Date: August 15 – September 15, 1942
Name: Glynn Robert Donaho
Service: Navy
Rank: Lieutenant Commander
Company: Commanding Officer
Division: U.S.S. Flying Fish (SS-229)
Citation: The President of the United States of America takes pleasure in presenting the Navy Cross to Lieutenant Commander Glynn Robert Donaho (NSN: 0-61092/1100), United States Navy, for extraordinary heroism and courageous devotion to duty in the line of his profession as Commanding Officer of the U.S.S. FLYING FISH (SS-229), on the SECOND War Patrol of that submarine during the period 15 August 1942 to 15 September 1942, in action with enemy Japanese naval forces in the Pacific War Area. Upon sighting a KONGO Class enemy battleship heavily screened by air and surface craft, Lieutenant Commander Donaho daringly maneuvered his ship to penetrate the enemy screen. In a bold, determined attack, he scored two direct hits, sinking an enemy patrol vessel and severely damaging the battleship which was observed to be burning fiercely one hour and fifty-three minutes later when the FLYING FISH returned to periscope depth after being driven deep by heavy enemy counter-offensive. The courage and skill displayed by Lieutenant Commander Donaho and the exemplary fighting spirit of his command were in keeping with the highest traditions of the United States Naval Service.

=== Second Navy Cross citation ===
His official second Navy Cross citation reads:

Action Date: October 27 – December 16, 1942
Name: Glynn Robert Donaho
Service: Navy
Rank: Lieutenant Commander
Company: Commanding Officer
Division: U.S.S. Flying Fish (SS-229)
Citation: The President of the United States of America takes pleasure in presenting a Gold Star in lieu of a Second Award of the Navy Cross to Lieutenant Commander Glynn Robert Donaho (NSN: 0-61092/1100), United States Navy, for extraordinary heroism in the line of his profession as Commanding Officer of the U.S.S. FLYING FISH (SS-229), on the THIRD War Patrol of that submarine during the period 27 October 1942 to 16 December 1942, in enemy controlled waters of the Solomon Islands. With skillful maneuvering and outstanding seamanship, Lieutenant Commander Donaho, despite the great mental and physical strain caused by long patrols in enemy waters, relentlessly pressed home his attacks. Defying the ever-present danger of anti-submarine measures, the men under his command on the FLYING FISH directed their torpedo fire with such accuracy that two enemy destroyers were sunk, while their own ship came through unscathed. Lieutenant Commander Donaho's courageous devotion to duty and intrepid fighting spirit reflect great credit upon himself, his command, and the United States Naval Service.

=== Third Navy Cross citation ===
His official third Navy Cross citation reads:

General Orders: Commander in Chief Pacific: Serial 01227
Action Date: January 5 – February 28, 1943
Name: Glynn Robert Donaho
Service: Navy
Rank: Lieutenant Commander
Company: Commanding Officer
Division: U.S.S. Flying Fish (SS-229)
Citation: The President of the United States of America takes pleasure in presenting a Second Gold Star in lieu of a Third Award of the Navy Cross to Lieutenant Commander Glynn Robert Donaho (NSN: 0-61092/1100), United States Navy, for extraordinary heroism and distinguished service in the line of his profession as Commanding Officer of the U.S.S. FLYING FISH (SS-229), on its FOURTH War Patrol in the Pacific, patrolling the waters of the Marianas Islands from 5 January 1943 to 28 February 1943. Skillfully maneuvering his ship within striking distance of the enemy, Commander Donaho made repeated torpedo attacks against Japanese shipping, sinking four vessels totaling 28,000 tons, and damaging two others totaling 12,620 tons. Despite vicious and determined countermeasures, he and his gallant men brought the FLYING FISH through these actions with only minor damage and without personnel casualties. Commander Donaho's able and fearless leadership and aggressive fighting spirit were in keeping with the highest traditions of the United States Naval Service.

=== Fourth Navy Cross citation ===
His official fourth Navy Cross citation reads:

General Orders: Pacific Fleet Board Awards: Serial 80 (January 5, 1945)
Action Date: July 23 – October 3, 1944
Name: Glynn Robert Donaho
Service: Navy
Rank: Captain
Company: Commanding Officer
Division: U.S.S. Picuda (SS-382)
Citation: The President of the United States of America takes pleasure in presenting a Third Gold Star in lieu of a Fourth Award of the Navy Cross to Captain [then Commander] Glynn Robert Donaho (NSN: 0-61092/1100), United States Navy, for extraordinary heroism in the line of his profession as Commanding Officer of the U.S.S. PICUDA (SS-382), on the THIRD War Patrol of that submarine during the period 23 July 1944 to 3 October 1944, and as Commander of the ELEVENTH Coordinated Attack Group of Submarines. Despite strong air and surface escort screens maintained around enemy shipping, Captain Donaho launched well planned and aggressive torpedo attacks which resulted in the sinking of five enemy freighters totaling 20,000 tons, and in the infliction of severe damage on a large 10,000-ton Japanese transport. In addition, he planned the actions of the attack group which sank sixteen enemy ships totaling 93,500 tons and damaged six other enemy ships totaling 49,000 tons and, escaping severe enemy countermeasures, brought his ship back to port. His professional skill and devotion to duty were in keeping with the highest traditions of the United States Naval Service.
