= USS Flying Fish (SS-229) =

Submarine of the United States

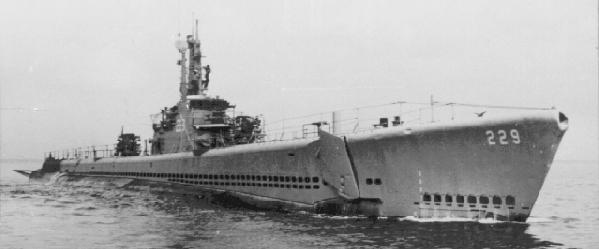
- USS Flying Fish (SS-229)

History

United States
- Name: USS Flying Fish
- Builder: Portsmouth Naval Shipyard, Kittery, Maine
- Laid down: 6 December 1940
- Launched: 9 July 1941
- Sponsored by: Mrs. Husband E. Kimmel
- Commissioned: 10 December 1941
- Decommissioned: 28 May 1954
- Stricken: 1 August 1958
- Honors and awards: 12 × battle stars
- Fate: Sold for scrap, 1 May 1959

General characteristics
- Class & type: Gato-class diesel-electric submarine
- Displacement: 1,525 long tons (1,549 t) surfaced; 2,424 long tons (2,463 t) submerged
- Length: 311 ft 9 in (95.02 m)
- Beam: 27 ft 3 in (8.31 m)
- Draft: 17 ft (5.2 m) maximum
- Propulsion: 4 × Fairbanks-Morse Model 38D8-1/8 9-cylinder opposed-piston diesel engines driving electrical generators; 2 × 126-cell Sargo batteries; 4 × high-speed Elliott electric motors with reduction gears; 2 × propellers; 5,400 shp (4.0 MW) surfaced; 2,740 shp (2.04 MW) submerged
- Speed: 21 knots (39 km/h) surfaced; 9 kn (17 km/h) submerged
- Range: 11,000 nautical miles (20,000 km) surfaced at 10 kn (19 km/h)
- Endurance: 48 hours at 2 kn (4 km/h) submerged; 75 days on patrol
- Test depth: 300 ft (90 m)
- Complement: 6 officers, 54 enlisted
- Armament: 10 × 21-inch (533 mm) torpedo tubes; 6 forward, 4 aft; 24 torpedoes; 1 × 3-inch (76 mm) / 50 caliber deck gun; Bofors 40 mm and Oerlikon 20 mm cannon

USS Flying Fish (hull number SS/AGSS-229), a Gato-class submarine, was the first submarine and second ship of the United States Navy to be named for the flying fish. Flying Fish is credited with having sunk a total of 58,306 tons of Japanese shipping and received 12 battle stars for World War II service.

== Construction and commissioning ==
The keel of Flying Fish was laid down on 6 December 1940 by the Portsmouth Naval Shipyard at Kittery, Maine. She was launched on 9 July 1941, sponsored by Mrs. Dorothy K. Kimmel, wife of Admiral Husband E. Kimmel, Commander-in-Chief, United States Pacific Fleet. Flying Fish was commissioned 10 December 1941, Lieutenant Commander Glynn "Donc" Donaho in command.

== December 1941–May 1942 ==
After shakedown training, Flying Fish transited the Panama Canal and departed Balboa in the Panama Canal Zone on 17 April 1942 bound for Pearl Harbor, Hawaii. During her voyage, a United States Army Air Forces plane mistook her for a Japanese submarine and dropped depth charges on her, but she submerged and avoided damage. She arrived at Pearl Harbor on 2 May 1942.

== First war patrol - Battle of Midway ==
On 17 May 1942, Flying Fish was ordered out to patrol west of Midway Atoll in the Northwestern Hawaiian Islands, which was threatened by an expected Japanese attack. During the Battle of Midway of 3–7 June 1942, she and her sisters fanned out to scout and screen the atoll, at which she refitted from 9 to 11 June. Continuing her first full war patrol, she searched major shipping lanes in the seas around Japan and scored a hit on a Japanese destroyer off Formosa during the night of 3 July 1942. She returned to Midway to refit on 25 July 1942.

== Second war patrol, August – September 1942 ==
On 15 August 1942, Flying Fish departed on her second war patrol, bound for a patrol area north of Truk. On 28 August, only three days after arriving on station, Flying Fish sighted the masts of a Japanese battleship (now known to be Yamato), guarded by two destroyers and air cover. She launched four torpedoes at this prime target, and two hits were detected by sonar. Immediately the counterattack began, and as Flying Fish prepared to launch torpedoes at one of the destroyers, rapidly closing to starboard, her commanding officer was blinded by a geyser of water thrown up by a bomb. Flying Fish went deep for cover. A barrage of 36 depth charges followed. When Flying Fish daringly came up to periscope depth 2 hours later, she found the two destroyers still searching, aided by two harbor submarine chasers and five aircraft. A great cloud of black smoke hung over the scene, persisting through the remaining hours of daylight. As Flying Fish upped periscope again a little later, a float plane dropped bombs directly astern, and the alert destroyers closed in. A salvo of torpedoes at one of the destroyers missed, and Flying Fish went deep again to endure another depth charging. Surfacing after dark, she once more attracted the enemy through excessive smoke from one of her engines, and again she was forced down by depth charges. Early in the morning of 29 August, she at last cleared the area to surface and charge her batteries. Possibly the torpedo explosions were premature; Japanese records show no warships lost on 28 August 1942.

Unshaken by this long day of attack, Flying Fish closed on Truk once more 2 September 1942, and attacked a 400-ton patrol vessel, only to see the torpedoes fail to explode upon hitting the target. The patrol ship ran down the torpedo tracks and began a depth charge attack, the second salvo of which damaged Flying Fish considerably. A second patrol ship came out to join the search; Flying Fish successfully evaded both opponents and cleared the area. Determinedly, she returned to the scene late the next night, and finding a single patrol vessel, sank her with two torpedoes just after midnight early on 4 September. Two hours later a second patrol craft came out, and as Flying Fish launched a stern shot, the Japanese ship opened fire, then swerved to avoid the torpedo. Flying Fish dived for safety, enduring seven depth charge runs by the patrol vessel. Two destroyers joined the patrol craft, and all three kept the submarine under attack for five hours. At last able to get clear, Flying Fish sailed for Pearl Harbor, where she arrived 15 September.

== Third and fourth war patrols, October 1942 – February 1943 ==
Flying Fish cleared Pearl Harbor 27 October, headed for her patrol area south of the Marshall Islands. Three times on this third patrol she launched bold attacks on Japanese task forces, only to suffer the frustration of poor torpedo performance, or to score hits causing damage which postwar evaluation could not confirm. She arrived at Brisbane for refit on 16 December 1942.

On 6 January 1943, Flying Fish started her fourth war patrol, a reconnaissance of the Marianas. Along with gaining much valuable intelligence, she damaged the Japanese troop transport Tokai Maru (8359 tons) in Apra harbor, Guam, on 26 January, hit the Japanese troop transport Nagizan Maru (4391 tons) in Tinian's Sunharon Roadstead 6 February, and sank the freighter Hyuga Maru (994 tons) in the presence of patrolling aircraft and surface escorts 16 February. She returned to Pearl Harbor 28 February.

== Crew casualties in Honolulu, 9 March 1943 ==
On 9 March 1943, three crewmen of the Flying Fish - Lyman Darol Williams, Leonard Mathis Sturms, and Harley Albert Kearney died after drinking wood alcohol at the Royal Hawaiian Hotel in Waikiki during their rest and recreation in Honolulu, Hawaii. The three seamen were the only casualties the crew of Flying Fish suffered during World War II.

== Fifth war patrol, March 1943 – May 1943 ==
Flying Fish stood out of Pearl Harbor 24 March for her fifth war patrol, this one to the coast of Honshū, where the submarine was battered by foul weather. On 12 April, she closed the northern coast to make a daring attack on the cargo vessel Sapporo Maru No.12 (2865 tons) which she sank, again in the presence of scout planes and armed trawlers. Moving north to Hokkaidō, Flying Fish damaged a large freighter on 13 April, and two days later torpedoed the inter-island transport ship Seiryu Maru (1904 tons) which beached itself in a mass of flames. Continuing her bold inshore attacks, on 19 April Flying Fish sank the Japanese army cargo ship Amaho Maru (2774 tons), and in the Tsugaru Strait on 24 April, sent cargo ship Kasuga Maru (1374 tons) the bottom. On 1 May a small inter-island freighter was sunk, but an alert enemy antisubmarine group shook Flying Fish considerably before she could clear the area. She returned to Midway from this highly successful patrol 11 May.

== Sixth war patrol, June – July 1943 ==
After five grueling patrols Lieutenant Commander Donaho turned command over to Captain Frank T. Watkins. On her sixth patrol (2 June – 27 July), Flying Fish patrolled in the Volcano Islands and off Taiwan. Her first attacks, two against the same convoy, resulted in unconfirmed damage, but off Taiwan on 2 July, she blasted the stern off of the merchant passenger/troop transport Canton Maru (2822 tons) watching it sink. While Pearl Harbor-bound from her patrol area, she made a two-day chase for a fast convoy, but was forced by her dwindling fuel supply to break off the hunt. On 11 July she destroyed the 125-foot (38 m) sailing vessel Japanese guard boat Takatori Maru No.8 (51 tons) with gunfire, leaving it aflame from stem to stern.

== Seventh war patrol, October – November 1943 ==
After a major overhaul at Pearl Harbor from 27 July to 4 October 1943, Flying Fish sailed on her seventh war patrol, again with her original skipper, bound for the Palaus. Her first attack, 18 October, scored at least one hit on Japanese aircraft carrier Chūyō. A two-day tracking of a well-escorted convoy from 26 – 28 October resulted in the sinking of troop transport ship Nanman Maru (6550 tons), on 27 October and the damaging of two merchantmen before Flying Fish ran out of torpedoes. She arrived at Midway 6 November.

== Eighth, ninth, and tenth war patrols, November 1943 – July 1944 ==
Flying Fish's eighth war patrol, the first to be commanded by Lieutenant Commander R. D. Risser, between Taiwan and the China coast from 30 November 1943 to 28 January 1944, found her sinking the passenger/cargo ship Ginyo Maru (8613 tons) laden with 6880 tons of maize, 600 tons of rice, 50 tons of beans, and 195 passengers on 16 December, taking 66 crewmen, 3 IJN gunners, and 118 passengers to the bottom, and fleet tanker Kyuei Maru (10,171 tons – entering service on 6 September 1943.) from convoy Hi-27 on 27 December. Her refit and retraining between patrols were held once more at Pearl Harbor.

Flying Fish sailed for her ninth war patrol 22 February for the waters off Iwo Jima. On 12 March, she sent the merchantman Taijin Maru (1924 tons) to the bottom, then closed the Okinawa shore and attacked a convoy in the early morning darkness of 16 March. The passenger/cargo ship Anzan Maru (5493 tons) was sunk and the tanker Teikon Maru (ex-German Winnetou), was damaged in this attack. Pressing on with her chase for six hours in the hope of finishing off the tanker, the submarine was detected and held down by aircraft and destroyers while the tanker escaped. On the afternoon of 31 March, Flying Fish was attacked by a Japanese submarine, whose torpedoes she skillfully evaded. Bound for Majuro at the close of her patrol, on April Fool's Day 1944, the submarine torpedoed and sank the freighter Minami Maru (2398 tons – formally the Norwegian Solviken). at Kitadaitōjima. Flying Fish closed out her patrol and arrived at Majuro 11 April 1944.

Clearing Majuro harbor 4 May, Flying Fish sailed for her tenth war patrol, coordinated with the assault on the Marianas scheduled to open the next month. First she covered shipping lanes between Ulithi, Yap, and Palau, coming under severe attack after one of her torpedoes exploded just outside the tubes on the night of 24 – 25 May when she was detected while attacking a four-ship convoy. At dawn, however, she had got back into position to sink the Japanese troop transport Taito Maru (4466 tons) loaded with 5,300 aviation gasoline cans, 2,500m3 of arms and 500-tons of cement, and the passenger/cargo ship Osaka Maru (3740 tons). The Osaka Maru was also out of Saipan bound for Palau in the same convoy, carrying 824 passengers and materials for the war effort. 97 passengers and all of the cargo went down with the ship.

Along with other American submarines, she then headed to take up a patrol station between the Palaus and San Bernardino Strait, from which she could scout any movement by the enemy fleet out of its base at Tawi in the Sulus while the Marines were landed on Saipan. On 15 June, the day of the invasion, Flying Fish spotted a Japanese carrier force emerging from San Bernardino Strait bound eastward. Her prompt report of this movement enabled a sister submarine, Cavalla, to sink the carrier Shōkaku four days later while American carrier aircraft broke the back of Japanese naval aviation in the Battle of the Philippine Sea. Flying Fish remained on her scouting station until 23 June, then sailed for Manus and Brisbane, arriving there 5 July.

== Eleventh war patrol, October – November 1944 ==
On 1 August 1944, Flying Fish was escorted out to sea from Brisbane, Australia, to begin her eleventh war patrol, this one taking her to Davao Gulf, the coast of Celebes, and along the shipping lanes from the Philippines to Halmahera. She departed Brisbane in the company with the submarine USS Flounder (SS-251), which was to share a patrol area with her. On 8 August, Flying Fish and Flounder arrived in the Admiralty Islands and moored alongside the submarine tender USS Euryale (AS-22) to take on fuel. As Flying Fish proceeded to her patrol area on 9 August 1944, the U.S. Navy destroyer USS Cogswell (DD-651) depth-charged her after she submerged to a depth of 250 feet (76 m) as Cogswell approached and did not respond to Cogswell's sonar recognition signals. Cogswell set her depth charges to explode at 150 feet (46 m) and halted her attack after Flying Fish responded to the recognition signals. Flying Fish suffered no damage.

Flying Fish arrived in her patrol area off Manado, Celebes, on 14 August 1944 Flying Fish was held down much of the time by Japanese aircraft. After refueling at Mios Woendi from 29 August to 1 September 1944, she closed Celebes, where on 7 September she detected a concealed Japanese airstrip. Her report led to the airfield's bombardment by Allied aircraft 11 days later. Through the remainder of her patrol she served on lifeguard duty for air strikes on Celebes. She concluded her patrol with her arrival at Midway on 18 October 1944.

== October 1944–May 1945 ==
Flying Fish departed Midway and proceeded to San Francisco, California, where she was equipped with naval mine detection and clearance equipment to enable her to penetrate the Sea of Japan. After testing her new gear she proceeded to Guam, which she reached on 18 May 1945.

== Twelfth war patrol, May – July 1945 ==
At Guam, Flying Fish joined a submarine task group for her 12th war patrol. She departed on 29 May 1945 for the heavily mined Tsushima Strait, entering the Sea of Japan 7 June. Then each of the task group's submarines headed for her own assigned area, Flying Fish setting course north for the coast of Korea. On 10–11 June, in separate attacks, she sank two cargo ships, Taga Maru (2,220 tons) on the 10th and Meisei Maru (3,095 tons) on the 11th, taking aboard one survivor. Five days later she sank ten small craft with gunfire and forced two others to beach themselves. She completed her patrol at Pearl Harbor on 4 July 1945. Hostilities with Japan ended on 15 August 1945.

== Post-World War II service ==
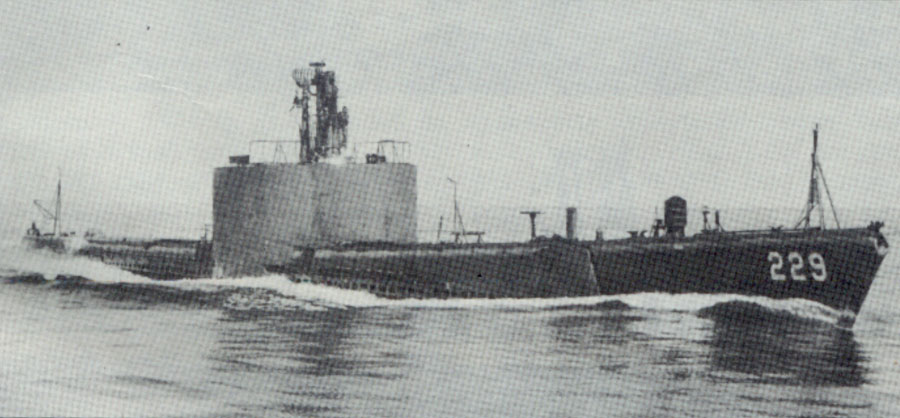
"With lines reminiscent of the Civil War's Monitor, the Flying Fish (AGSS-229) was fitted with a unique round conning tower containing experimental sonar equipment." This is the sonar salvaged from the Prinz Eugen. (US Navy photo/ Sea Classics Magazine)

Flying Fish returned to Naval Submarine Base New London on 21 September 1945 to become flagship of Commander, Submarine Force, United States Atlantic Fleet (COMSUBLANT). During the next eight years, from her base at New London, Flying Fish conducted United States Naval Reserve training cruises in Long Island Sound and Block Island Sound, exercised off the Virginia Capes, trained men of foreign navies, joined in major operations in the Caribbean, and cruised to Canadian ports. She was reclassified as an auxiliary submarine, AGSS-229, on 29 November 1950.

On 11 January 1951, Flying Fish completed her duty as flagship and began to serve the Underwater Sound Laboratory in sonar experiments, notably testing a passive GHG sonar salvaged from the former German heavy cruiser Prinz Eugen in a large array surrounding her conning tower. On 29 February 1952, at 10:53, Flying Fish became the first American submarine to make 5,000 dives. On board for the event was a distinguished party headed by United States Secretary of the Navy Dan A. Kimball.

== Decommissioning and disposal ==
Placed in commission in reserve on 31 December 1953, Flying Fish was decommissioned at New London on 28 May 1954 and was sold for scrapping 1 May 1959.

== Honors and awards ==
Of Flying Fish's twelve war patrols, all save the 11th were designated as "successful". She is credited with having sunk a total of 58,306 tons of enemy shipping. She received 12 battle stars for World War II service.

== Awards ==
- American Campaign Medal
- Asiatic-Pacific Campaign Medal with 12 battle stars
- World War II Victory Medal
- National Defense Service Medal
