= George W. Davis VI =

US Navy rear admiral (born 1938)

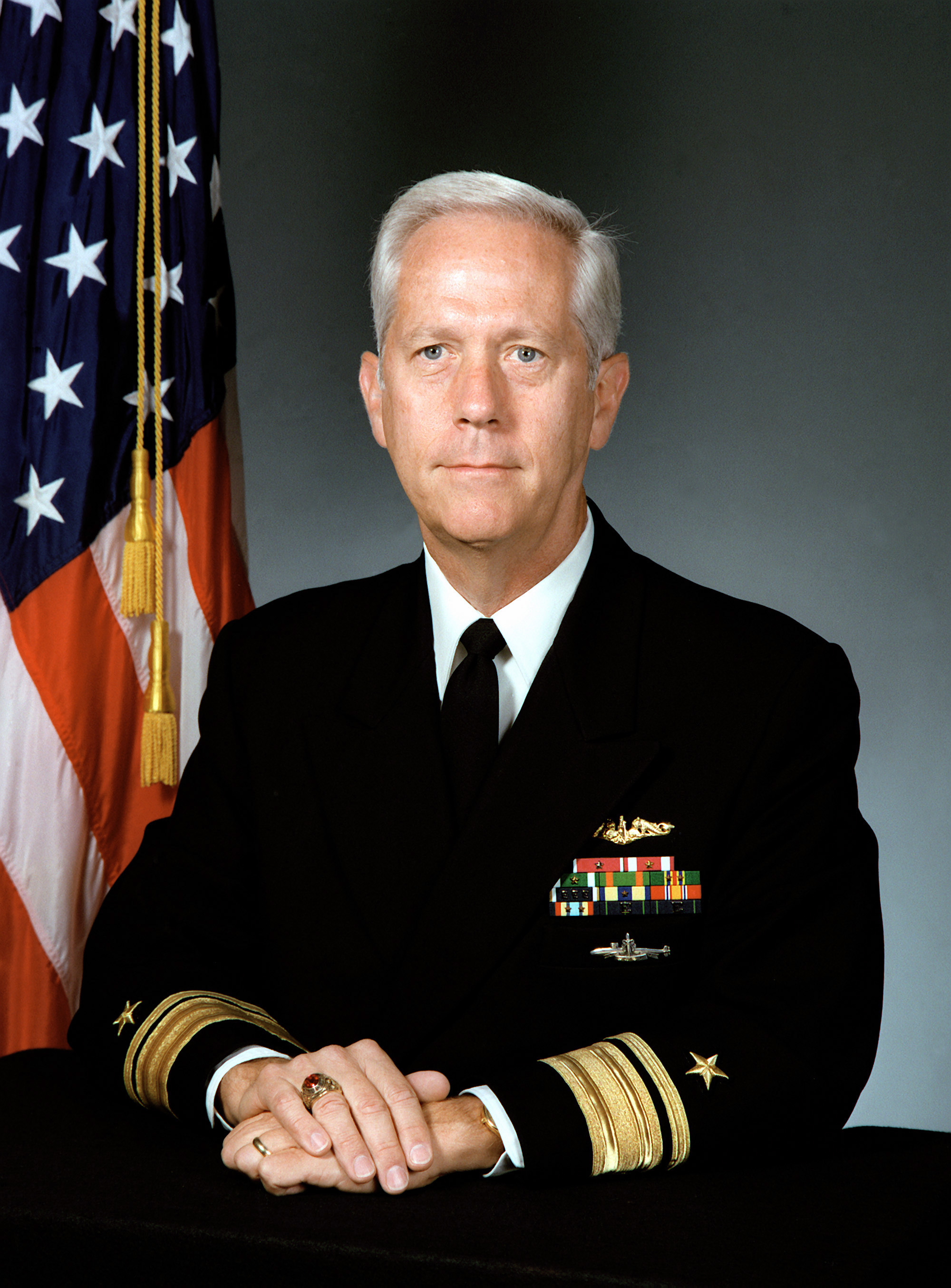
- Born: 20 August 1938 (age 88); Hawaii
- Military career
- Allegiance: United States
- Branch: United States Navy
- Rank: Rear Admiral
- Commands: Naval Inspector General

George Washington Davis VI (born 20 August 1938) was a rear admiral in the United States Navy. He was the Naval Inspector General from 1990 to 1992. Davis is a 1960 graduate of the United States Naval Academy.
