= Taguba Report =

2004 report of the United States government

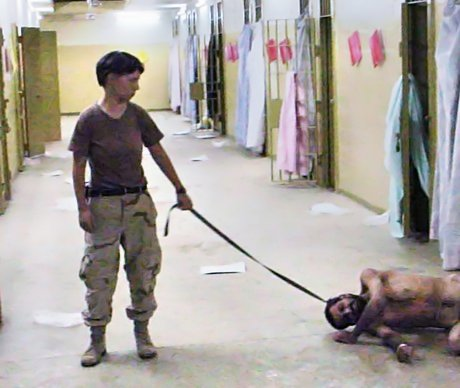
Lynndie England forcing an inmate, known to the guards as "Gus", to crawl and bark like a dog on a leash.

The Taguba Report, officially titled US Army 15-6 Report of Abuse of Prisoners in Iraq, is a report published in May 2004 containing the findings from an official military inquiry into the Abu Ghraib prisoner abuse. It is named after Major General Antonio Taguba, the report's principal author.

== Initiation ==
Lieutenant General Ricardo Sanchez, the senior officer in Iraq, appointed Major General Antonio Taguba to open an Army Regulation 15-6 investigation into the conduct of the 800th Military Police Brigade.

According to the report, the inquiry was initiated because:

"LTG Sanchez requested an investigation of detention and internment operations by the Brigade from 1 November 2003 to present. LTG Sanchez cited recent reports of detainee abuse, escapes from confinement facilities, and accountability lapses, which indicated systemic problems within the brigade and suggested a lack of clear standards, proficiency, and leadership."

According to Taguba, his mandate was limited to examining the actions of the military police at Abu Ghraib and he was blocked from investigating further up the chain of command.

== Findings ==
In his Findings of Fact, Major General Taguba wrote:

"That between October and December 2003, at the Abu Ghraib Confinement Facility (BCCF), numerous incidents of sadistic, blatant, and wanton criminal abuses were inflicted on several detainees. This systemic and illegal abuse of detainees was intentionally perpetrated by several members of the military police guard force (372nd Military Police Company, 320th Military Police Battalion, 800th MP Brigade), in Tier (section) 1-A of the Abu Ghraib Prison (BCCF). The allegations of abuse were substantiated by detailed witness statements (ANNEX 26) and the discovery of extremely graphic photographic evidence...In addition to the aforementioned crimes, there were also abuses committed by members of the 325th MI Battalion, 205th MI Brigade, and Joint Interrogation and Debriefing Center (JIDC). Specifically, on 24 November 2003, [name redacted], 205th MI Brigade, sought to degrade a detainee by having him strip and returned to cell naked. (ANNEXES 26 and 53)".

In addition he found:

"...that the intentional abuse of detainees by military police personnel included the following acts:
a. (S) Punching, slapping, and kicking detainees; jumping on their naked feet;
b. (S) Videotaping and photographing naked male and female detainees;
c. (S) Forcibly arranging detainees in various sexually explicit positions for photographing;
d. (S) Forcing detainees to remove their clothing and keeping them naked for several days at a time;
e. (S) Forcing naked male detainees to wear women's underwear;
f. (S) Forcing groups of male detainees to masturbate themselves while being photographed and videotaped;
g. (S) Arranging naked male detainees in a pile and then jumping on them;
h. (S) Positioning a naked detainee on a MRE Box, with a sandbag on his head, and attaching wires to his fingers, toes, and penis to simulate electric torture;
i. (S) Writing “I am a Rapeist” (sic) on the leg of a detainee alleged to have forcibly raped a 15-year old fellow detainee, and then photographing him naked;
j. (S) Placing a dog chain or strap around a naked detainee's neck and having a female Soldier pose for a picture;
k. (S) A male MP guard having sex with a female detainee;
l. (S) Using military working dogs (without muzzles) to intimidate and frighten detainees, and in at least one case biting and severely injuring a detainee;

m. (S) Taking photographs of dead Iraqi detainees. (ANNEXES 25 and 26)"

And that these "...findings are amply supported by written confessions provided by several of the suspects, written statements provided by detainees, and witness statements."

Major General Taguba also determined that the testimony of several detainees was "...credible based on the clarity of their statements and supporting evidence provided by other witnesses (ANNEX 26)". The detainees described the following acts of abuse:

"a. (U) Breaking chemical lights and pouring the phosphoric liquid on detainees;
b. (U) Threatening detainees with a charged 9mm pistol;
c. (U) Pouring cold water on naked detainees;
d. (U) Beating detainees with a broom handle and a chair;
e. (U) Threatening male detainees with rape;
f. (U) Allowing a military police guard to stitch the wound of a detainee who was injured after being slammed against the wall in his cell;
g. (U) Sodomizing a detainee with a chemical light and perhaps a broom stick.
h. (U) Using military working dogs to frighten and intimidate detainees with threats of attack, and in one instance actually biting a detainee."

The Report recommended increased training of interrogators and the dissemination of information regarding the treatment of prisoners, both actions emphasizing the Geneva Conventions.

The Report team was also tasked with addressing the problem of detainee escapes. The Report found significant inconsistencies in the handling and processing of detainees. It recommended the standardization of detainee processing routines, the updating of accounting systems, the improvement of structural features, and several other recommendations.

== Films ==
- 2025 - Cover-Up

== See also ==
- Abu Ghraib torture and prisoner abuse
- Fay Report
- Church report
- Ryder Report (Detention and Corrections in Iraq)
