= Tracy E. Perkins =

American army sergeant

Tracy E. Perkins (born 1971) is a Sergeant First Class (reduced in rank by court martial to Staff Sergeant) in the U.S. Army.

On 3 January 2004, he forced, at gunpoint, civilian plumbers Zaidoun Hassoun and Marwan Fadel to leap from a road bridge in Samarra, Iraq, into the waters of the River Tigris below. The cousins Hassoun and Fadel had been caught by a U.S. checkpoint after curfew. Fadel managed to reach the riverbank, but claims that he saw Hassoun drown and that the family later retrieved and buried the body. Perkins accused of pushing another Iraqi civilian off a different bridge into the Tigris near Balad, Iraq, in December 2003.

At least four senior officers, including the battalion commander of the four soldiers, Lt. Col. Nathan Sassaman, were reprimanded for impeding investigators. On 8 January 2005, a military court in Fort Hood, Texas, U.S., acquitted Perkins of involuntary manslaughter but convicted him of aggravated assault and obstruction of justice. He received a prison term of six months and a reduction in rank. Also charged were Lt. Jack M. Saville, Sgt. Reggie Martinez, and Spec. Terry Bowman. Saville pleaded guilty to assault and dereliction of duty. He was sentenced to 45 days in jail and ordered to forfeit $12,000 in pay. Involuntary manslaughter charges against Martinez, and assault charges against Bowman, were later dropped.
