= Mohammed Munim al-Izmerly =

Mohammed Munim al-Izmerly was an Iraqi chemistry professor who allegedly experimented with poisons on prisoners while Saddam Hussein was president of Iraq and died while in US custody in early February 2004, ten months after his arrest.

== Alleged role in weapons development ==
In an October 6, 2005 report by Charles A. Duelfer, a CIA adviser who led the arms-hunting Iraq Survey Group, Izmerly is alleged to have been a key figure in training other Iraqi chemists trying to make poison gas for military use in the 1970s, the leader of the effort to produce mustard gas, and in the 1980s was chief of the chemical section of the Iraq Intelligence Service. According to the report, Izmerly's ex-colleagues told interrogators that al-Izmerly was head of human experiments and tested substances for use on assassination targets by giving poisoned food or injections to about 100 political and other prisoners. The report states that Izmerly admitted giving poison to 20 people as part of the experimental program.

== Circumstances of death ==
The US security forces initially claimed in a note on the body bag containing Izmerly's body, which was delivered to the Baghdad morgue in February 2004, at an estimated two weeks after his death, stating that the death was due to brainstem compression. Prof Izmerly's family stated that three weeks earlier, they had visited him in the US prison at Baghdad airport and that he had seemed in good health.

An autopsy was commissioned by Izmerly's family and carried out by Dr Faik Amin Baker, director of Baghdad hospital's forensic department, who said that Izmerly's death was caused by a sudden hit to the back of his head and that the cause of death was blunt trauma. It was uncertain exactly how he died, but someone had hit him from behind, possibly with a bar or a pistol. It was also found that US doctors had made a 20 cm incision in his skull, apparently in an attempt to save his life after the initial blow.

Izmerly's daughter, Rana Izmerly, alleged to the Guardian that her father was murdered: The evidence is clear. It suggests the Americans killed him and then tried to hide what they had done. ... You offer no proof that he did something wrong, you refuse him a lawyer and then you kill him. Why? Izmerly's family presented its autopsy findings to an Iraqi judge and reported that the judge claimed he lacked the power to investigate, stating You can't do anything to the coalition. What happened is history.

== See also ==
- Chemical warfare
- Violence against academics in post-invasion Iraq
