= Church Report on detainee interrogation =

US report on treatment of detainees

The Church report on detainee interrogation and incarceration (officially Review of Department of Defense Detention Operations and Detainee Interrogation Techniques) is a US government report completed under the direction of Vice Admiral Albert T. Church, an officer in the United States Navy. Church was then the Naval Inspector General.

Church's mandate was to investigate the interrogation and incarceration of detainees in the United States "war on terror", in Afghanistan, Iraq and Guantanamo Bay. The inquiry was initiated on May 25, 2004. A version of its report was finished on March 2, 2005 and published on March 11.

An unclassified 21-page executive summary has been circulated. The full 368-page report is classified.

Church and his staff interviewed 800 individuals, Washington policy-makers, Armed Services members, and allies of the United States. Human Rights Watch reports that the Church inquiry didn't interview any detainees.

== Highlights ==
- The inquiry concluded that 26 deaths in custody merited homicide charges.
- Senior officers ignored warning signs, like the reports submitted to them by the Red Cross.

== Unredacted version published ==
On February 11, 2009, the American Civil Liberties Union received an unredacted copy of the report. They published an excerpt allegedly proving illegal abuses of power had resulted in the death of several individuals.

- Original 2005 Church Report redacted release
  - Part 1
  - Part 2
  - Part 3
  - Church Report
- Further Church Report material released in litigation
  - Report p.281, released April 2008
  - Report pp. 353-365, released April 2008
  - Report pp.235 & 242, released January 2009

== See also ==
- Fay Report
- Ryder Report
