= Antonio Taguba =

Retired United States Army general (born 1950)

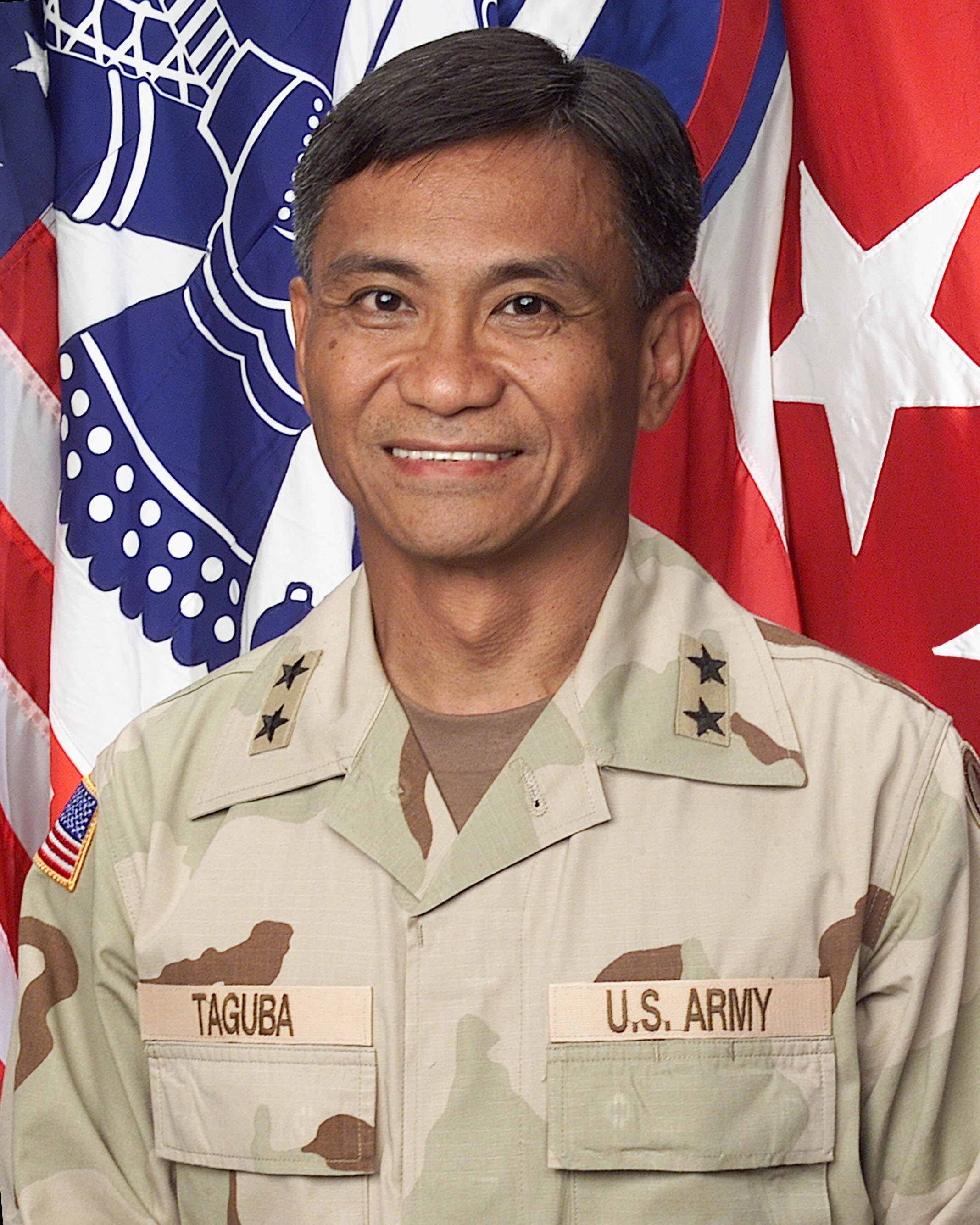
- Major General Antonio Taguba
- Born: October 31, 1950 (age 75); Manila, Philippines
- Military career
- Allegiance: United States
- Branch: United States Army
- Service years: 1972–2007
- Rank: Major General
- Commands: United States Army Community and Family Support Center; 2nd Brigade, 2nd Armored Division; 1st Battalion, 72nd Armored Regiment
- Awards: Army Distinguished Service Medal; Legion of Merit (4)

Antonio Mario Taguba (born October 31, 1950) is a retired major general in the United States Army. He was the second American citizen of Philippine birth to be promoted to general officer rank in the United States Army.

Taguba is best known for authoring the Taguba Report, an internal United States Army report on abuse of detainees held at Abu Ghraib prison in Iraq. The report was leaked, then published, in 2004. Taguba again made national headlines in June 2008 when he accused the Bush administration of committing war crimes in a preface to a report by Physicians for Human Rights on prisoner abuse and torture in American military prisons.

== Early life ==
Taguba was born in Sampaloc, Manila, Philippines, the city to which his family had moved from their home province of Cagayan. His father was a soldier in the 45th Infantry Regiment, Philippine Division (Philippine Scouts), who fought in the Battle of Bataan (January–April 1942) during World War II and, after capture by the Japanese, survived the Bataan Death March. Taguba was raised by his mother and grandmother. When he was 11 years old, his family moved to Hawaii, in the United States.

== Education ==
Taguba graduated from Leilehua High School in Wahiawa, Hawaii, in 1968. He received his Bachelor of Arts degree in history from Idaho State University in 1972, and graduated from the Armor Officer Basic and Advanced Course, the Army Command and General Staff College, the College of Naval Command and Staff, and the Army War College.

In addition, Taguba holds a Master of Public Administration degree from Webster University, a Master of Arts degree in international relations from Salve Regina College, and a Master of Arts in national security and strategic studies from the College of Naval Command and Staff at the Naval War College.

== Military career ==
Taguba was commissioned as a second lieutenant in 1972. He served in Dongducheon, Republic of Korea, less than ten miles from North Korea in the Combat Support Company as the mortar platoon leader in 1974–1975 of the 1st Battalion, 72d Armor, 2nd Infantry Division, I Corps, Eighth Army.

At Fort Sill, Oklahoma, Taguba commanded the headquarters and headquarters battery, staff and faculty battalion, Field Artillery School/Center. He then served for three years in Germany, commanding a tank company in a mechanized infantry division at Mainz (Company B, 4th Battalion, 69th Armored Regiment).

Back in Korea, Taguba commanded the 1st Battalion, 72nd Armored Regiment, 2nd Infantry Division at Camp Casey; and was the executive officer for plans and policy of the Republic of Korea-U.S. Combined Forces Command in Yongsan.

At the Pentagon Taguba served as a material systems analyst, Office of the Chief of Staff, Army. At Fort Hood, Texas, he commanded the "St. Lo," 2nd Brigade, 2nd Armored Division; when the brigade was transferred to the 4th Infantry Division, Colonel Taguba assumed command of the "Warhorse," 2nd Brigade, 4th Infantry Division from June 1995 until he transferred command in June 1997.

At Fort McPherson, Georgia, Taguba was chief of staff of the United States Army Reserve Command. At Fort Jackson, South Carolina, he was assistant division commander-forward of the 24th Infantry Division (Mechanized) and Deputy Commanding General (South), First United States Army.

At Alexandria, Virginia, Taguba was promoted to brigadier general and given command of the United States Army Community and Family Support Center.

Major General Taguba served for ten months as deputy commanding general for support of the Third United States Army, United States Army Forces Central Command, Coalition Forces Land Component Command, based in Kuwait. Earlier, he was at the Pentagon as acting director of the Army Staff, Headquarters, Department of the Army, under General Eric K. Shinseki.

In 2004, Taguba was assigned to report on abuse of prisoners in Abu Ghraib prison in Iraq. In May of that year, he published an extremely critical report that was leaked to the public. Later that month, Major General Taguba was reassigned to the Pentagon to serve as deputy assistant secretary of defense for readiness, training and mobilization in the Office of the Assistant Secretary of Defense for Reserve Affairs. Describing his thoughts upon being informed by John Abizaid a few weeks after the leak that he and his report would be investigated, Taguba said "I'd been in the Army thirty-two years by then, and it was the first time that I thought I was in the Mafia."

In January 2006, General Richard A. Cody, the Army's Vice-Chief of Staff, instructed Taguba to retire by the following January. No official explanation was given; Taguba himself believes his forced retirement was ordered by civilian Pentagon officials in retaliation for his report on abuse of prisoners. Taguba's retirement, effective January 1, 2007, ended a 34-year career of military service.

== Work on prisoner abuse ==
In 2004, Taguba was assigned to head an investigation into accusations of prisoner abuse in the Abu Ghraib prison in Iraq. Taguba became known worldwide when the Taguba Report, a classified, internal U.S. Army report on the investigation, was leaked to the public and published to national attention. The report was extremely critical of U.S. Army conduct and found widespread negligence and abuse.

In June 2008, Taguba was again in the headlines when he wrote the preface to a report by Physicians for Human Rights on prisoner abuse and torture at Abu Ghraib prison, in Guantanamo Bay, and in Afghanistan. In it, he accused the Bush administration of committing war crimes and called for the prosecution of those responsible. He wrote, "There is no longer any doubt that the current administration committed war crimes. The only question is whether those who ordered torture will be held to account."

Taguba speaks about the Taguba Report in the 2025 documentary Cover-Up.

== Personal ==
In the 2024 United States presidential election, Taguba endorsed Kamala Harris.

== Decorations ==
=== Badges ===
Army Staff Identification Badge

=== Medals and ribbons ===
Army Distinguished Service Medal
Legion of Merit with three oak leaf clusters
Meritorious Service Medal with five oak leaf clusters
Army Commendation Medal with two oak leaf clusters
Army Achievement Medal with one oak leaf cluster
National Defense Service Medal with two bronze service stars
Global War on Terrorism Expeditionary Medal
Global War on Terrorism Service Medal
Korea Defense Service Medal
Army Service Ribbon
Army Overseas Service Ribbon
