= Ryder Report (Detention and Corrections in Iraq) =

Report on abuse by American troops in Iraq

The Ryder Report, officially the Report on Detention and Corrections Operations in Iraq, is an official report produced by an inquiry by U.S Provost Marshal General Donald Ryder into reports of abuse by American troops in Iraq. Ryder's report was completed on November 5, 2003.

Among Ryder's recommendations was that the duties of the Military Police troops who guarded detainees should be kept strictly separated from those of the Military Intelligence troops who interrogated them.

The Ryder report remains classified.
