= Detainees held in the Bagram Theater Internment Facility =

On January 16, 2010, the United States Department of Defense complied with a court order and made public a heavily redacted list of the detainees held in the Bagram Theater Internment Facility. Detainees were initially held in primitive, temporary quarters, in what was originally called the Bagram Collection Point, from late 2001. Detainees were later moved to an indoor detention center until late 2009, when newly constructed facilities were opened.

The identity of most detainees held in Bagram remained classified until the publication of the first list in January 2010.

Dozens of the names on the list are identical to names of detainees who had been held in the Guantanamo Bay detention camps, in Cuba. It was reported that three of the detainees in Bagram had formerly been held in Guantanamo, because they had the same Internment Serial Numbers. They were: Gul Zaman, Khadan Kadri and Hafizullah Shabaz Khau.

While some Guantanamo detainees were sent directly to Guantanamo from CIA custody, most Guantanamo detainees spent some time in US Military custody at Bagram, or at the similar Kandahar detention facility. Close to one hundred detainees testified about their time in Bagram during one of their OARDEC proceedings, or told reporters about their stay after their release.

Several dozen individuals reported being held in Bagram prior to the preparation of the official list published in January 2010. A few individuals report being released from Bagram, who aren't on the official list because they arrived there are the official list was prepared.

== Guantanamo detainees who reported spending time in Bagram ==
| Guantanamo ISN | Name | Notes |
|---|---|---|
| 762 | Abaidullah | Reported abuse in Bagram to his Combatant Status Review Tribunal in Guantanamo. |
| 307 | Abd Al Nasir Mohammed Abd Al Qadir Khantumani | Sent to Bagram after several days of beatings by Afghan soldiers in Gardez.; Eventually sent to Guantanamo. |
| 489 | Abd Al Rahim Abdul Rassak Janko | Passed directly from Taliban custody to American custody.; Taliban believed he was an American spy. |
| 686 | Abdel Ghalib Ahmad Hakim | Testified to his Combatant Status Review Tribunal that he had spent months in detention in Pakistani custody, and then in American custody, in Kandahar and Bagram, prior to being transferred to Cuba. He said none of his interrogators had asked him questions that implied they thought he was affiliated with Al Qaida until after he came to Cuba. |
| 1463 | Abdul Al Salam Al Hilal | Passed through Bagram after being held in the CIA's black sites, before being transferred to Guantanamo. |
| 963 | Abdul Bagi | Testified, to his Combatant Status Review Tribunal, that he learned, seven days after his capture, in Bagram, that he was accused of tossing a rifle down a well, Would have arrived in Bagram on February 17, 2003.; Eventually transferred to Guantanamo. |
| 502 | Abdul Bin Mohammed Bin Abess Ourgy | |
| 1032 | Abdul Ghaffar | |
| 954 | Abdul Ghafour | |
| 1007 | Abdul Halim Sadiqi | Alleged to have sent students from Pakistani madrassas to serve as fighters in Afghanistan. |
| | Abdul Jabar | A 35-year-old taxi driver who testified he was held near Dilawar and experienced abuse. |
| 1002 | Abdul Matin | |
| 874 | Abdul Nasir | |
| | Abdul Razaq | One of the detainees whose amalgamated habeas corpus petition is known as Ghulam Mohammed v. Don Rumsfeld. |
| 306 | Abdul Salam Zaeef | Former Taliban ambassador to Pakistan.; Reports abuse in Bagram.; Currently under house arrest. |
| | Abdul Salaam | One of the detainees whose amalgamated habeas corpus petition is known as Ghulam Mohammed v. Don Rumsfeld. |
| 753 | Abdul Zahir | |
| | Abdur Rahim | One of the passengers in Dilawar's jitney taxi.; Testified to the same kind of abuse that killed Dilawar.; Eventually transferred to Guantanamo—but his name is missing from the official list of Guantanamo detainees. |
| | Abdul Wahid | Beaten to death in Bagram on November 6, 2003. |
| 332 | Abdullah Al Tayabi | |
| | Abdullah Shahab | |
| 452 | Oybek Jamoldinivich Jabbarov | |
| | Abu Yahia al-Libi | |
| 940 | Adel Hassan Hamad | |
| | Ahmaddullah | Captured with five other men from the village of Kirmati, near Gardez city in late May 2002. and his brother |
| 845 | Akhtar Mohammed | |
| | Amanullah | Captured with five other men from the village of Kirmati, near Gardez city in late May 2002. and his brother |
| | Amanullah | A veteran of struggle against Afghanistan's Soviet invaders, in the 1980s, captured in early 2004, who reports he never learned why he was apprehended.; Claims he was held for a year in solitary confinement in Bagram. |
| 948 | Anwar Khan (Guantanamo detainee 948) | |
| 152 | Asim Thahit Abdullah Al Khalaqi | A Yemeni who was in Afghanistan as a Tablighi Jamaat pilgrim and was trapped in Afghanistan when the borders were closed following 9-11. |
| 256 | Atag Ali Abdoh Al-Haj | |
| 782 | Awal Gul | |
| 817 | Richard Belmar | |
| 975 | Bostan Karim | |
| BT421 | Dilawar | Beaten to death in Bagram on December 10, 2002. |
| 680 | Emad Abdalla Hassan | |
| 888 | Esmatulla | |
| 688 | Fahmi Abdullah Ahmed | |
| | Fazal Ahmad | One of the detainees whose amalgamated habeas corpus petition is known as Ghulam Mohammed v. Don Rumsfeld. |
| 1897 | Fazel Karim | |
| 987 | Ghalib | |
| 516 | Ghanim Abdul Rahman Al Harbi | |
| | Ghanum Gul | One of the detainees whose amalgamated habeas corpus petition is known as Ghulam Mohammed v. Don Rumsfeld. |
| 1021 | Gul Chaman | |
| | Gul Mohammed | One of the detainees whose amalgamated habeas corpus petition is known as Ghulam Mohammed v. Don Rumsfeld. |
| | Gul Rehman | One of the detainees whose amalgamated habeas corpus petition is known as Ghulam Mohammed v. Don Rumsfeld. |
| 907 | Habib Rahman | |
| | Habibullah | Beaten to death in Bagram on December 4, 2002. |
| 1001 | Hafizullah Shabaz Khail | Spent five years in Guantanamo, was cleared for release in December 2007, and subsequently rearrested in September 2008.; His American lawyer believes he was rearrested because US military officials in Afghanistan failed to update their records to show he had been cleared for release. |
| | Hameedullah | One of the detainees whose amalgamated habeas corpus petition is known as Ghulam Mohammed v. Don Rumsfeld. |
| | Hakkim Shah | A 32-year-old farmer who testified he was held near Dilawar and experienced abuse. |
| | Hamid Ullah | One of the detainees whose amalgamated habeas corpus petition is known as Ghulam Mohammed v. Don Rumsfeld. |
| 1119 | Haji Hamidullah | |
| | Hasan Balgaid | One of the detainees whose amalgamated habeas corpus petition is known as Ghulam Mohammed v. Don Rumsfeld. |
| 940 | Hassan Adel Hussein | |
| 94 | Ibrahim Daif Allah Neman Al Sehli | |
| | Jan Baz Khan | A militia leader who captured and turned over Dilawar, Habibullah, Khandan Kadir. and half a dozen other detainees.; Had the security contract for Firebase Salerno. Turned over suspects following a rocket attack on December 1, 2002, only to fall under suspicion of being behind the attack himself.; The nephew and protégé of a powerful militia leader named Pacha Khan Zadran. |
| | Jawed Ahmad | An Afghan journalist working as a cameraman for the Canadian CTV network who was accused of being in possession of video of members of the Taliban.; The American base commander confirmed that a review Board determined that he was an "unlawful enemy combatant". |
| 1095 | Jumma Jan | |
| 586 | Karam Khamis Sayd Khamsan | |
| 589 | Khalid Mahomoud Abdul Wahab Al Asmr | |
| 831 | Khandan Kadir | A pharmacist who was hired by the new government of Afghanistan's to be Khowst's regional director of the anti-narcotics branch of its new Intelligence service.; Denounced and captured by Jan Baz, a local militia leader who was himself captured by the Americans, four months later.; Eventually transferred to Guantanamo. |
| | Khoja Mohammad | Captured with five other men and his brother from the village of Kirmati, near Gardez city in late May 2002. |
| 3984 | Lahur Gul | Testified that he was collecting firewood when arrested.; Uniform issued consisted of "bottle-green overalls over loose brown trousers", which Reuters reported indicated that camp authorities regarded him as a medium security risk. |
| 660 | Lufti Bin Swei Lagha | |
| 1052 | Mahbub Rahman | A teenage student. captured with, Azimullah, Mohammed Salim and Rahman Tulah, accused of helping guide fighters who launched a rocket attack on Firebase Salerno.; Eventually transferred to Guantanamo. |
| 519 | Mahrar Rafat Al Quwari | |
| | Malik Abdual Rahim | One of the detainees whose amalgamated habeas corpus petition is known as Ghulam Mohammed v. Don Rumsfeld. |
| 939 | Mammar Ameur | |
| 558 | Moazzam Begg | |
| 909 | Mohabet Khan | |
| 333 | Mohamed Atiq Awayd Al Harbi | |
| | Mohamed Farag Ahmad Bashmilah | |
| 900 | Mohamed Jawad | |
| 7 | Mohammad Fazil | |
| 849 | Mohammed Nasim | |
| 681 | Mohammed Mohammed Hassen | |
| 1008 | Mohammed Mustafa Sohail | |
| | Mohammad Naim | Captured with five other men from the village of Kirmati, near Gardez city in late May 2002. and his brother |
| 955 | Mohammed Quasam | |
| | Mohammed Salim | Captured with Mahbub Rahman, Azimullah and Rahman Tulah.; Mahbub Rahman requested a statement from him, at his Tribunal. He was told that although he was still in US custody, in Bagram, his testimony was not reasonably available. |
| 532 | Mohammed Sharif | |
| | Mohammed Yaqoub Akhounzada | One of the detainees whose amalgamated habeas corpus petition is known as Ghulam Mohammed v. Don Rumsfeld. |
| 1004 | Mohammed Yacoub | |
| | Mohibullah | One of the detainees whose amalgamated habeas corpus petition is known as Ghulam Mohammed v. Don Rumsfeld. |
| | Mubibbullah Khan | A District Chief in Zabul Province who was apprehended in September 2005, accused of being a Taliban informant.; Lived out most of the Taliban's administration in exile in Pakistan. |
| | Muhammed Dawood | David Hicks was also known as Muhammed Dawood.; One of the detainees whose amalgamated habeas corpus petition is known as Ghulam Mohammed v. Don Rumsfeld.; An individual named Mohammed Dawood was among the 645 names listed on the only list of; Bagram capties to be published.: According to historian Andy Worthington, author of The Guantanamo Files, he was arrested in Gelan District, Ghazni Province, on September 1, 2009. |
| 839 | Musab Omar Ali Al Mudwani | |
| | Maulvi Naeem | One of the detainees whose amalgamated habeas corpus petition is known as Ghulam Mohammed v. Don Rumsfeld. |
| 967 | Naserullah | |
| 1019 | Nasibullah | |
| | Nazar Mohammed | One of the detainees whose amalgamated habeas corpus petition is known as Ghulam Mohammed v. Don Rumsfeld. |
| 727 | Omar Deghayes | Has stated that Bagram was worse than Guantanamo. |
| | Parkhudin | Testified before the inquiry into Dilawar's death that he was suspended from the ceiling for 8 to 10 days. |
| 591 | Qari Esmhatulla | |
| | Qibullah | One of the detainees whose amalgamated habeas corpus petition is known as Ghulam Mohammed v. Don Rumsfeld. |
| | Raheem Ullah | One of the detainees whose amalgamated habeas corpus petition is known as Ghulam Mohammed v. Don Rumsfeld. |
| 835 | Rasool Shahwali Zair Mohammed Mohammed | An Afghan whose family had fled to Pakistan to escape the decades of warfare in Afghanistan. He and his brothers had been educated in Pakistan, and he had trained to become a medical technician. In response to Hamid Karzai's entreaties for educated expatriate Afghans to return he and his brother had returned and set up a medical clinic in their families traditional home. His brother Shahwali Zair Mohammed Shaheen Naqeebyllah was a doctor, and he ran the lab.; The first American officer commanding a small nearby outpost had relied on his brother for introductions to all the local elders, because he was an educated, Western-oriented man, who spoke English. Because his brother had introduced them, the local elders directed all of their requests to the Americans through him. So his brother started writing a series of notes to the local American officer.; When the first American officer was replaced, his brother continued to write these notes to his replacement—who regarded them as threats and arrested the two brothers. |
| | Raz Mohammad | One of the detainees whose amalgamated habeas corpus petition is known as Ghulam Mohammed v. Don Rumsfeld. |
| | Redha al-Najar | A Tunisian, captured at his home in Karachi in May 2005 who spent two years in the CIA's black sites prior to being sent to Bagram. |
| 945 | Said Amir Jan | |
| 1035 | Sada Jan | |
| 1056 | Said Mohammed | |
| 1154 | Said Mohammed Ali Shah | |
| 311 | Saiid Farhi | |
| | Salih | |
| | Samoud Khan | Three Guantanamo detainees testified that Samoud Khan had led the platoon-sized armed band they were captured with; most of their group escaped, but they were told that Samoud was still in Bagram. |
| | Sardar Khan | One of the detainees whose amalgamated habeas corpus petition is known as Ghulam Mohammed v. Don Rumsfeld. |
| | Sardar Mohammad | One of the detainees whose amalgamated habeas corpus petition is known as Ghulam Mohammed v. Don Rumsfeld. |
| | Saud Memon | Alleged to have played a role in the kidnapping and murder of Daniel Pearl.; Disappeared shortly after Pearl's murder, only to be left on the doorsteps of his family in April 2007.; Saud Memon's weight had dropped to 36 kilograms; he was unable to recognize his relatives; and died less than a month after his release.; On November 12, 2007 The Wall Street Journal reported that he had been held and interrogated in Bagram. |
| 914 | Shardar Khan | |
| 944 | Sharifullah | |
| 899 | Shawali Khan | |
| 834 | Shahwali Zair Mohammed Shaheen Naqeebyllah | An Afghan whose family had fled to Pakistan to escape the decades of warfare in Afghanistan. He and his brothers had been educated in Pakistan, and he had worked his way through medical school. In response to Hamid Karzai's entreaties for educated expatriate Afghans to return he and his brother had returned and set up a medical clinic in their families traditional home. His brother Rasool Shahwali Zair Mohammed Mohammed was a trained medical technician, who ran the modern medical lab they set up in their clinic.; The first American officer commanding a small nearby outpost had relied on him for introductions to all the local elders, because he was an educated, Western-oriented man, who spoke English. Because he had introduced them, the local elders directed all of their requests to the Americans through him. So he started writing a series of notes to the local American officer.; When the first American officer was replaced, he continued to write these notes to his replacement—who regarded them as threats and arrested the brothers. |
| | Sherbat | Captured with five other men from the village of Kirmati, near Gardez city in late May 2002. and his brother |
| 933 | Swar Khan | |
| 902 | Taj Mohammed | |
| 535 | Tariq Mahmoud Ahmed Al Sawah | |
| | Wakil Ahmed Muttawakil | The Taliban's last Foreign Minister, released in the fall of 2003.; The BBC reports he sent an envoy to warn the USA a month prior to al Qaeda's attack on 9-11, and that he had argued for turning over Osama bin Laden in September 2001. |
| 550 | Walid Said Bin Said Zaid | |
| | Haji Wazir | Captured in 2002, filed a writ of habeas corpus in 2006, still held in Bagram as of December 2008. |
| | Haji Wazir | Held for ten months, and released in 2006. |
| 898 | Zakim Shah | A 20-year-old farmer who testified he was held near Dilawar and experienced abuse. |
| | Zafir Khan | One of the detainees whose amalgamated habeas corpus petition is known as Ghulam Mohammed v. Don Rumsfeld. |
| | Zalmay Shah | |

== Individuals who reported being held in Bagram prior to the publication of the first official list ==
| Name | Notes |
|---|---|
| Abdul Jabar | A 35-year-old taxi driver who testified he was held near Dilawar and experienced abuse. |
| Abdul Razaq | One of the detainees whose amalgamated habeas corpus petition is known as Ghulam Mohammed v. Don Rumsfeld. |
| Abdul Salaam | One of the detainees whose amalgamated habeas corpus petition is known as Ghulam Mohammed v. Don Rumsfeld. |
| Abdur Rahim | One of the passengers in Dilawar's jitney taxi.; Testified to the same kind of abuse that killed Dilawar.; Eventually transferred to Guantanamo—but his name is missing from the official list of Guantanamo detainees. |
| Abdul Wahid | Beaten to death in Bagram on November 6, 2003. |
| Abdullah Shahab | |
| Abu Yahia al-Libi | |
| Ahmaddullah | Captured with five other men from the village of Kirmati, near Gardez city in late May 2002. and his brother |
| Amanullah | Captured with five other men from the village of Kirmati, near Gardez city in late May 2002. and his brother |
| Amanullah | A veteran of struggle against Afghanistan's Soviet invaders, in the 1980s, captured in early 2004, who reports he never learned why he was apprehended.; Claims he was held for a year in solitary confinement in Bagram. |
| Dilawar | Beaten to death in Bagram on December 10, 2002.; A mugshot of Dilawar has been published; showing that he had the ISN 421. |
| Fazal Ahmad | One of the detainees whose amalgamated habeas corpus petition is known as Ghulam Mohammed v. Don Rumsfeld. |
| Ghanum Gul | One of the detainees whose amalgamated habeas corpus petition is known as Ghulam Mohammed v. Don Rumsfeld. |
| Gul Mohammed | One of the detainees whose amalgamated habeas corpus petition is known as Ghulam Mohammed v. Don Rumsfeld. |
| Gul Rehman | One of the detainees whose amalgamated habeas corpus petition is known as Ghulam Mohammed v. Don Rumsfeld. |
| Habibullah | Beaten to death in Bagram on December 4, 2002. |
| Hameedullah | One of the detainees whose amalgamated habeas corpus petition is known as Ghulam Mohammed v. Don Rumsfeld. |
| Hakkim Shah | A 32-year-old farmer who testified he was held near Dilawar and experienced abuse. |
| Hamid Ullah | One of the detainees whose amalgamated habeas corpus petition is known as Ghulam Mohammed v. Don Rumsfeld. |
| Hasan Balgaid | One of the detainees whose amalgamated habeas corpus petition is known as Ghulam Mohammed v. Don Rumsfeld. |
| Jan Baz Khan | A militia leader who captured and turned over Dilawar, Habibullah, Khandan Kadir. and half a dozen other detainees.; Had the security contract for Firebase Salerno. Turned over suspects following a rocket attack on December 1, 2002, only to fall under suspicion of being behind the attack himself.; The nephew and protégé of a powerful militia leader named Pacha Khan Zadran. |
| Jawed Ahmad | An Afghan journalist working as a cameraman for the Canadian CTV network who was accused of being in possession of video of members of the Taliban.; The American base commander confirmed that a review Board determined that he was an "unlawful enemy combatant". |
| Khoja Mohammad | Captured with five other men from the village of Kirmati, near Gardez city in late May 2002. and his brother |
| Malik Abdual Rahim | One of the detainees whose amalgamated habeas corpus petition is known as Ghulam Mohammed v. Don Rumsfeld. |
| Mohamed Farag Ahmad Bashmilah | |
| Mohammad Ayub | One of the detainees whose amalgamated habeas corpus petition is known as Ghulam Mohammed v. Don Rumsfeld. |
| Mohammed Ayub | One of the detainees whose amalgamated habeas corpus petition is known as Ghulam Mohammed v. Don Rumsfeld. |
| Mohammad Naim | Captured with five other men from the village of Kirmati, near Gardez city in late May 2002. and his brother |
| Mohammed Salim | Captured with Mahbub Rahman, Azimullah and Rahman Tulah.; Mahbub Rahman requested a statement from him, at his Tribunal. He was told that although he was still in US custody, in Bagram, his testimony was not reasonably available. |
| Mohammed Yaqoub Akhounzada | One of the detainees whose amalgamated habeas corpus petition is known as Ghulam Mohammed v. Don Rumsfeld. |
| Mohibullah | One of the detainees whose amalgamated habeas corpus petition is known as Ghulam Mohammed v. Don Rumsfeld. |
| Mubibbullah Khan | A District Chief in Zabul Province who was apprehended in September 2005, accused of being a Taliban informant.; Lived out most of the Taliban's administration in exile in Pakistan. |
| Muhammed Dawood | David Hicks was also known as Muhammed Dawood.; One of the detainees whose amalgamated habeas corpus petition is known as Ghulam Mohammed v. Don Rumsfeld. |
| Maulvi Naeem | One of the detainees whose amalgamated habeas corpus petition is known as Ghulam Mohammed v. Don Rumsfeld. |
| Nazar Mohammed | One of the detainees whose amalgamated habeas corpus petition is known as Ghulam Mohammed v. Don Rumsfeld. |
| Parkhudin | Testified before the inquiry into Dilawar's death that he was suspended from the ceiling for 8 to 10 days. |
| Qibullah | One of the detainees whose amalgamated habeas corpus petition is known as Ghulam Mohammed v. Don Rumsfeld. |
| Raheem Ullah | One of the detainees whose amalgamated habeas corpus petition is known as Ghulam Mohammed v. Don Rumsfeld. |
| Raymond Azar | Alleges abusive treatment by security officials. |
| Redha al-Najar | A Tunisian, captured at his home in Karachi in May 2005 who spent two years in the CIA's black sites prior to being sent to Bagram. |
| Salih | One of the detainees whose amalgamated habeas corpus petition is known as Ghulam Mohammed v. Don Rumsfeld. |
| Samoud Khan | Three Guantanamo detainees testified that Samoud Khan had led the platoon-sized armed band they were captured with, most of their group escaped, but they were told that Samoud was still in Bagram. |
| Sardar Khan | One of the detainees whose amalgamated habeas corpus petition is known as Ghulam Mohammed v. Don Rumsfeld. |
| Sardar Mohammad | One of the detainees whose amalgamated habeas corpus petition is known as Ghulam Mohammed v. Don Rumsfeld. |
| Saud Memon | Alleged to have played a role in the kidnapping and murder of Daniel Pearl.; Disappeared shortly after Pearl's murder, only to be left on the doorsteps of his family in April 2007.; Saud Memon's weight had dropped to 36 kilograms; he was unable to recognize his relatives; and died less than a month after his release.; On November 12, 2007 The Wall Street Journal reported that he had been held and interrogated in Bagram. |
| Sherbat | Captured with five other men from the village of Kirmati, near Gardez city in late May 2002. and his brother |
| Wakil Ahmed Muttawakil | The Taliban's last Foreign Minister, released in the fall of 2003.; The BBC reports he sent an envoy to warn the USA a month prior to al Qaeda's attack on 9-11, and that he had argued for turning over Osama bin Laden in September 2001. |
| Haji Wazir | Captured in 2002, filed a writ of habeas corpus in 2006, still held in Bagram as of December 2008. |
| Haji Wazir | Held for ten months, and released in 2006. |
| Zafir Khan | One of the detainees whose amalgamated habeas corpus petition is known as Ghulam Mohammed v. Don Rumsfeld. |
Zalmay Shah

== The official list of Bagram detainees, as of September 22, 2009 ==
| First official list of Guantanamo detainees | First official list of Bagram detainees |
|---|---|
| Hamidullah (Guantanamo detainee 456), Hamidullah (Guantanamo detainee 1119), Hamidullah (Guantanamo detainee 642), | Hamidullah (Bagram detainee sequence 001869), Hamidullah (Bagram detainee sequence 003658), Hamidullah (Bagram detainee sequence 003718), Hamidullah (Bagram detainee sequence 003881), |
| Abdul Ghani (Guantanamo detainee 934); Abdul Ghani (Guantanamo detainee 943) | Abdul Ghani (Bagram detainee) |
| Abdul Malik (Guantanamo detainee) | Abdul Malik (Bagram detainee) |
| Gul Zaman | Gul Zaman (Bagram detainee sequence 000459); Gul Zaman (Bagram detainee sequence 003355) |
| Abdul Sattar (Guantanamo detainee 10) | Abdul Satar (Bagram detainee sequence 003409); Abdul Sattar (Bagram detainee sequence 003663); Abdul Satar (Bagram detainee sequence 020021) |
| Abdul Rahim (Guantanamo detainee 549) | Abdul Rahim (Bagram detainee sequence 004077); Abdul Rahim (Bagram detainee sequence 020017) |
| Mohammed Rahim (Guantanamo detainee 10030); Mohammed Rahim (Guantanamo detainee 1104) | Mohammad Rahim (Bagram detainee sequence 003821); Mohammad Rahim (Bagram detainee sequence 004164) |
| Naqibullah | Naqibullah (Bagram detainee sequence 003701); Naqibullah (Bagram detainee sequence 3960bf) |
| Mohammad Fazil | Mohammad Fazil (Bagram detainee) |
| Abdul Zahir (Guantanamo detainee 753) | Abdul Zahir (Bagram detainee) |
| Abdul Karim (Guantanamo detainee 520) | Abdul Karim (Bagram detainee sequence 003014); Abdul Karim (Bagram detainee sequence 004139) |
| Rahmatullah | Rahmatullah (Bagram detainee sequence 003086); Rahmatullah (Bagram detainee sequence 003802); Rahmatullah (Bagram detainee sequence 004136); Rahmatullah (Bagram detainee sequence 004142); Rahmatullah (Bagram detainee sequence 020003) |
| Hafizullah | Maulawi Hafizullah (Bagram detainee sequence 003279); Hafizullah (Bagram detainee sequence 004067) |
| Mohammad Gul (Guantanamo detainee 457) | Mohammed Gul (Bagram detainee) |
| Fazil Rahman (Guantanamo detainee 496) | Fazil Rahman (Bagram detainee) |
| Hafizullah Shabaz Khail | Hafizullah Shabaz Khau (Bagram detainee) |
| Sahib Rohullah Wakil also known as "Haji Rohullah" | Rohullah (Bagram detainee); Rohullah (Bagram detainee sequence 003417); Rohullah (Bagram detainee sequence 003830); Rohullah (Bagram detainee sequence 003841) |
| Mohammed Sharif | Mohammed Sharif (Bagram detainee) |
| Abdul Rahim (Guantanamo detainee 897) | Abdul Rahim (Bagram detainee) |
| | Gulam Farouq |
| | Azzimuddin (detainee) |

== See also ==
- Bagram torture and prisoner abuse
- Sayed Gulab
- Khaled Samy Abdallah Ismail
- Pasta Khan
- Mahajir Ziarahman
