= Redha al-Najar =

Citizen of Tunisia held in detention by the United States

- Born: 1966 (age 59–60)
- Arrested: Karachi, Pakistan
- Citizenship: Tunisia
- Detained at: CIA black sites, Bagram
- ISN: 1466
- Charge: No charge (extrajudicial detention)
- Status: Repatriated

Redha al-Najar (born 1966) is a citizen of Tunisia who was held in US custody in the Bagram Theater Internment Facility. He is notable for being one of a very small number of the detainees held in Bagram to have had a writ of habeas corpus submitted on his behalf.

Time magazine reports he was captured at his home in Karachi, Pakistan in May 2002. Time reports he spent two years in the CIA's black sites, before being transferred to Bagram. Al-Najar is represented by Barbara Olshansky of Stanford University's International Human Rights Clinic, Tina Monshipour Foster of the International Justice Network, and Sylvia Royce in association with the International Justice Network. Al-Najar was not allowed to send a letter until 2003.

On 15 January 2010, the Department of Defense complied with a court order and published a heavily redacted list of Detainees held in the Bagram Theater Internment Facility.

There were 645 names on the list, which was dated 22 September 2009. One of the names was Ridha Ahmad Najjar. [sic] Historian Andy Worthington, author of The Guantanamo Files, asserted that this was another transliteration of Redah al-Najar, who he said was captured in May 2002 in Karachi, Pakistan. Worthington reported he was held in the CIA's "dark prison", and several other CIA black sites, including the "Panjshir prison", and two prisons named "Rissat prison" and "Rissat prison 2". al-Najar's incarceration was not revealed to the International Committee of the Red Cross and he was "...forced to spend 22 hours each day with one or both wrists chained to an overhead bar, for two consecutive days, while wearing a diaper."

On 9 December 2014, the United States Senate Intelligence Committee published the names of 39 individuals tortured by the CIA in its archipelago of black sites. An individual named Ridha Ahmad Najar was listed as one of individuals the CIA tortured.

On 15 December 2014, the Washington Post published an op-ed by Tina M. Foster, one of Najar's lawyers. In the article she wrote about how a whole section of the Intelligence Committee's report was devoted to Najar. She listed all the torture techniques the CIA used on him, and asserted the CIA had tortured him for nearly 700 days.

On 15 June 2015, he was repatriated to Tunisia by the US Government.
