= Ahmad Dilshad =

- Born: Bahawalpur, Punjab province
- Arrested: 2004-04; Iraq; British forces
- Detained at: Bagram
- Other names: Danish Ahmad; Abdul Rehman al-Dakhil
- ISN: 1432
- Alleged to be a member of: alleged member of Lashkar-e-Tayyiba
- Charge(s): no charge, extrajudicial detention

On January 15, 2010, the Department of Defense complied with a court order and published a list of captives held in the Bagram Theater Internment Facility that included the name Ahmad Dilshad.

There were 645 names on the heavily redacted list, which was dated September 22, 2009.

According to historian Andy Worthington, author of The Guantanamo Files, Ahmad Dilshad was captured in Baghdad, Iraq with four other men. Worthington reported Ahmad Dilshad was also known as "Danish Ahmad" and "Abdul Rehman al-Dakhil".

Asia Times called him a "leading LeT [Lashkar-e-Tayyiba] ringleader"—a militant group devoted to independence for the portion of Kashmir administered by India. Asia Times reported that Dilshad had called for LeT to expand its militant activities beyond Kashmir as early as 1997. They reported that he was a "known confidant of Zaki-ur-Rahman Lakhvi". They reported he had served as LeT's operational head, and had "trained many LeT fighters in its Maskar Abu Bashir camp in Afghanistan".

According to Worthington, Dilshad was captured in Baghdad, while Asia Times said he was captured in Iraq's southernmost city, Basra, on the border with Iran.
