= Mahajir Ziarahman =

- Born: 1985 (age 40–41)
- Arrested: 2008-04-25; Khost
- Detained at: Bagram
- Other name
- ISN: 3580
- Alleged to be a member of: alleged to be part of the Haqanni network
- Charge(s): no charge, extrajudicial detention

On January 15, 2010, the Department of Defense complied with a court order and published a list of Captives held in the Bagram Theater Internment Facility that included the name Mahajir Ziarahman.

There were 645 names on the list, which was dated September 22, 2009, and was heavily redacted.

Mahajir Ziarahman was apprehended on April 25, 2008, together with his older brother Baitullah, in Sabari district, Khost. The two men were alleged to have been members of the "Haqqani network" and to have been part of a cell that emplaced improvised explosive devices.

Historian Andy Worthington, author of The Guantanamo Files, asserted that while the Mahajir Ziarahman is the individual still in Bagram, "it is not known what happened to Baitullah."
