= Khaled Samy Abdallah Ismail =

- Born: Egypt
- Arrested: 2006-04; Kandahar
- Citizenship: Egyptian / Canadian
- Detained at: BTIF
- Status: unknown
- Occupation: engineer

Khaled Samy Abdallah Ismail is a dual Canadian-Egyptian citizen, who was held by American forces in the Bagram Theater Internment Facility in Afghanistan. On September 26, 2011 CBC News reported that recently published cables from the whistleblower organization WikiLeaks discussed Khaled's eighteen months in the Bagram facility.

Khaled worked in Canada as a computer engineer, starting in 1995. According to the U.S. diplomatic cables, he was captured in April 2006, in Kandahar, spent over 18 months in US custody in Bagram.

The CBC characterized Ismail as having a "troubled" personality. They report he filed a human rights complaint after he lost his first job in Canada.

Khaled was apprehended in Kandahar in the spring of 2006, according to a source who spoke to CBC News. According to the diplomatic cables, he was visited by Canadian consular officials eight months after his apprehension. The cables published by WikiLeaks revealed that Canadian officials were negotiating with US officials for Khaled's return to Canada.

On September 27, 2011, CBC News reported that human rights experts question whether American officials had failed to inform Canadian diplomats in a timely manner, and this explained why it took eight months to make a consular visit to Ismail. She then quoted Tina Foster executive director of International Justice Network:

"The more likely scenario is that the Canadians were notified and like most things in Afghanistan, if there is nobody watching and there is no pressure placed on individuals to move people through the system, they will not move."

CBC News quoted a source familiar with the case who stated Khaled was captured by Afghan officials because he triggered their suspicion and they found he was carrying electronic components. Those components were later determined to be benign. Ghairat Baheer, a fellow Bagram internee, said that Khaled told him he had not been captured as a fighter.
