= Joshua Claus =

Joshua R. Claus is a former member of the United States Army, whose unit was present at both Iraq's Abu Ghraib and at the Bagram Theater Detention Facility in Afghanistan, and was the first interrogator of Guantanamo detainee Omar Khadr. In 2005, he was found guilty of maltreatment and assault against an Afghanistan detainee who later died.

== Claus's role in the deaths in custody of Dilawar and Habibullah ==
Claus pleaded guilty to playing a role in the routine abuse of captives held in extrajudicial detention in the Bagram Theatre Detention Facility in 2002, at a time when Claus's unit, the 519th Military Intelligence Battalion, was assigned to Bagram. Detainees Habibullah and Dilawar (surnames were not provided) were killed in custody during that time. Military pathologists classified the killings as homicides. Claus and 27 other members of the United States Armed Forces were named for the role they played in the abuse. However, military prosecutors decided that responsibility for the men's deaths was spread too broadly for any one soldier to face murder or manslaughter charges.

Claus was charged with assault, prisoner maltreatment, and lying to investigators. He pleaded guilty, and received a five-month prison sentence in 2005.

== Claus's interrogation of Omar Khadr ==
On March 14, 2008, it became known that Claus was one of Omar Khadr's first interrogators. The U.S. government has attempted to keep this information suppressed, asking reporters to identify Claus as "Interrogator One." When Carol Rosenberg, of the Miami Herald, and Michelle Shephard of the Toronto Star, two reporters who had been following the Guantanamo commissions closely, and two other Canadian reporters published Claus's name, following a pre-trial hearing in May 2010, they were banned from traveling to Guantanamo. Shephard had already published an interview with Claus, where he openly acknowledged being Khadr's interrogator. The Guantanamo prosecution were widely criticized for treating Claus's name as a secret when it had already been widely publicized. The ban was quietly rescinded in July 2010.

Claus was given immunity from prosecution for any possible abuse of Khadr during the interrogation, in return for his testimony at Khadr's murder trial before a military tribunal at Guantanamo. The trial began on August 10, 2010.
