= Do Ab prison =

Prison in Afghanistan

The Do Ab prison is a prison in Panjshir, Afghanistan. The International Committee of the Red Cross reported 270 captives held in the prison were released on January 3, 2002. They reported that some of the captives had been held in the prison for as long as six years.

== Individuals reported to have been held in the Panjshir prison ==
Individuals reported to have been held in the Panjshir prison
Salim Ahmed Hamdan
- Andy Worthington, the author of The Guantanamo Files, reported that an Afghan prison in Panjshir had been used to house ghost prisoners.
- He reported that Salim Ahmed Hamdan was held in an Afghan prison in Panjshir, where the staff at the prison “repeatedly tied him up, put a bag over his head and knocked him to the ground,” and used "hand torture" on him.
Ibn al-Shaykh al-Libi
- According to Worthington, Ibn al-Shaykh al-Libi was also held, for a time, in the Panjshir prison.
Sanad al-Kazimi
- Omar Deghayes told Worthington that Sanad al-Kazimi told him about the Panjshir prison.
Abu Yahya al-Libi
- According to Worthington, Abu Yahya al-Libi was one of four captives who made a surprising escape from the Bagram Internment Facility, who described also being held in the Panjshir prison, and identified 12 other captives held there.

== See also ==
- List of prisons in Afghanistan
