= Azzimuddin (detainee) =

United States detainee

- Born: 1972 (age 53–54)
- Detained at: the black prison, Bagram
- Charge: no charge (extrajudicial detention)
- Status: claims he was held in Bagram's secret black prison

Azzimuddin (born 1972) is a citizen of Afghanistan who was held in extrajudicial detention in the United States Bagram Theater Internment Facility, in Afghanistan. After approximately three months of detention, he was released on May 15, 2010, on the same day as 10 other Afghans. The Miami Herald described their release as a symbolic gesture.

According to the Miami Herald, Azzimuddin told reporters he had spent the first two weeks of his detention in Bagram's secret "black prison", and a further three months in the main Bagram prison, where he underwent daily interrogations. He told reporters his interrogators believed he had helped arm the Taliban, but that they eventually concluded he was innocent.

According to the Miami Herald, Captain Jack Hanzlik, a military spokesman, disputed that the USA was operating any secret prisons.

On January 15, 2010, the Department of Defense complied with a court order and published a list of detainees held in the Bagram Theater Internment Facility. There were 645 names on the heavily redacted list, which was dated September 22, 2009. Azzimuddin's name was not on that list.
