= Bagram torture and prisoner abuse =

Early 2000s torture by American soldiers in Bagram, Afghanistan

A sally port used in the transfer of internees to and from the 12-man cells during the nine years that the "temporary" facility was in use

In 2005, The New York Times obtained a 2,000-page United States Army investigatory report concerning the homicides of two unarmed civilian Afghan prisoners by U.S. military personnel in December 2002 at the Bagram Theater Internment Facility (also Bagram Collection Point or B.C.P., now the Parwan Detention Facility) in Bagram, Afghanistan, and general treatment of prisoners. Two Afghan men, Habibullah (30) and Dilawar (22), were repeatedly chained to the ceiling and beaten, resulting in their deaths. Military coroners ruled that both prisoners' deaths were homicides. Autopsies revealed severe trauma to both prisoners' legs; one of the coroners described the trauma as comparable to being run over by a bus. Seven soldiers were charged in 2005.

Hajimumin, another prisoner, told Al Jazeera that they tied them to chairs and applied electric shocks for 30 seconds a time for torture purposes.

== Location ==
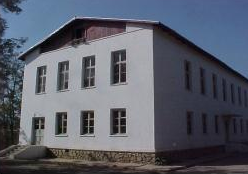
The former hospital on-base where lawyer Dennis Edney alleges abuse of Omar Khadr began

The torture and homicides allegedly took place at the military detention center known as the Bagram Theater Internment Facility, which had been built by the Soviet Union as an aircraft machine shop during the Soviet–Afghan War (1980–1989), which was a concrete-and-sheet metal facility that was retrofitted with wire pens and wooden isolation cells; the center was part of Bagram Airfield in Bagram, near Charikar in Parwan Province, Afghanistan.

== Detainees ==
In January 2010, the American military released the names of 645 detainees held at the main detention center at Bagram, modifying its long-held position against publishing such information. This was to comply with a Freedom of Information Act lawsuit filed in September 2009 by the American Civil Liberties Union, whose lawyers had also demanded detailed information about conditions, rules, and regulations at the center.

== Victims ==
=== Habibullah ===
Habibullah died on December 4, 2002. Several U.S. soldiers hit the chained man with so-called "peroneal strikes", or severe blows to the side of the leg above the knee. This incapacitates the leg by hitting the common peroneal nerve. According to The New York Times:

By Dec. 3, Mr. Habibullah's reputation for defiance seemed to make him an open target. [He had taken at least 9 peroneal strikes from two MPs for being "noncompliant and combative."]

... When Sgt. James P. Boland saw Mr. Habibullah on Dec. 3, he was in one of the isolation cells, tethered to the ceiling by two sets of handcuffs and a chain around his waist. His body was slumped forward, held up by the chains. Sergeant Boland ... had entered the cell with [Specialists Anthony M. Morden and Brian E. Cammack]...

...kneeing the prisoner sharply in the thigh, "maybe a couple" of times. Mr. Habibullah's limp body swayed back and forth in the chains.

=== Dilawar ===
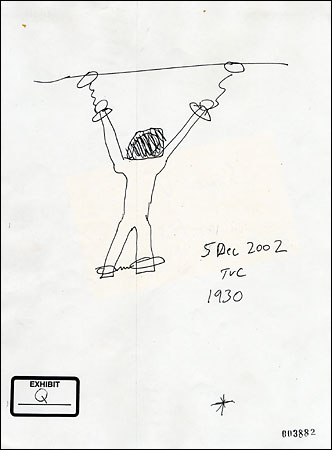
A sketch showing how Dilawar was chained to the ceiling of his cell by Thomas V. Curtis, a former sergeant in the Reserve United States Army Military Police Corps

Dilawar, who died on December 10, 2002, was a 22-year-old Afghan taxi driver and farmer who weighed 122 pounds and was described by his interpreters as neither violent nor aggressive.

When beaten, he repeatedly cried "Allah". The outcry appears to have amused U.S. military personnel. The act of striking him to provoke a scream of "Allah" eventually "became a kind of running joke", according to one of the MP's. "People kept showing up to give this detainee a common peroneal strike just to hear him scream out 'Allah'", he said. "It went on over a 24-hour period, and I would think that it was over 100 strikes."

The Times reported that:

On the day of his death, Dilawar had been chained by the wrists to the top of his cell for much of the previous four days.

A guard tried to force the young man to his knees. But his legs, which had been pummeled by guards for several days, could no longer bend. An interrogator told Mr. Dilawar that he could see a doctor after they finished with him. When he was finally sent back to his cell, though, the guards were instructed only to chain the prisoner back to the ceiling.

"Leave him up," one of the guards quoted Specialist Claus as saying. Several hours passed before an emergency room doctor finally saw Mr. Dilawar. By then he was dead, his body beginning to stiffen.

It would be many months before Army investigators learned a final horrific detail: Most of the interrogators had believed Mr. Dilawar was an innocent man who simply drove his taxi past the American base at the wrong time.

=== Aafia Siddiqui/Prisoner 650 ===
Aafia Siddiqui, a Pakistani citizen educated in the United States as a neuroscientist, was suspected of the attempted assault and killing of U.S. personnel in Afghanistan. She disappeared in 2003 with her three children. She was allegedly detained for five years at Bagram with her children; she was the only female prisoner. She was known to the male detainees as "Prisoner 650". The media dubbed her the "Mata Hari of al-Qaida" or the "Grey Lady of Bagram". Yvonne Ridley says that Siddiqui is the "Grey Lady of Bagram" – a ghostly female detainee, who kept prisoners awake "with her haunting sobs and piercing screams". In 2005, male prisoners were so agitated by her plight, Ridley said, that they went on a hunger strike for six days. Siddiqui's family maintains that she was abused at Bagram.

=== Binyam Mohamed ===
Mohamed immigrated to the U.K. from Ethiopia in 1994 and sought asylum. In 2001, he converted to Islam and travelled to Pakistan, followed by Afghanistan, to see if the Taliban-run Afghanistan was "a good Islamic country". U.S. authorities believed that he was a would-be bomber who fought alongside the Taliban in Afghanistan. Pakistani immigration officials arrested him at the airport in April 2002 before he returned to the U.K., and Mohamed has said officials have used evidence gained through torture in sites in Pakistan, Morocco and Afghanistan between 2002 and 2004, before he was "secretly rendered" to the U.S. Guantanamo Bay detention camp in Cuba. In October 2008, the U.S. dropped all charges against him. Mohamed was reported as very ill as a result of a hunger strike in the weeks before his release. In February 2009, Mohamed was interviewed by Moazzam Begg, a fellow Bagram detainee and founder of CagePrisoners, an organization to help released detainees. Mohamed identified a photo of Aafia Siddiqui as the woman whom he and other male detainees had seen at Bagram, known as "Prisoner 650".

=== Others ===
Mohammed Sulaymon Barre, a Somali refugee who worked for a funds transfer company, described his Bagram interrogation as "torture". Barre said he was picked up and thrown around the interrogation room when he would not confess to a false allegation. He was put into an isolation chamber that was maintained at a piercingly cold temperature for several weeks, and deprived of sufficient rations during this period. As a result of this treatment, his hands and feet swelled, causing him such excruciating pain that he could not stand up.

Zalmay Shah, a citizen of Afghanistan, alleges mistreatment during detention at Bagram air base. An article published in the May 2, 2007, issue of The New Republic contained excerpts from an interview with Shah. He said he had originally cooperated closely with the Americans. He had worked with an American he knew only as "Tony" in the roundup of former members of the Taliban. According to the article:

While delivering one wanted man into U.S. custody, Shah was himself arrested, hooded, shackled, and stripped. Soldiers taped his mouth shut, refusing to let him spit out the snuff he was chewing. For three days, his jailers in Bagram denied him food. All the while, Shah pleaded his innocence and reminded the Americans of his friendship with 'Tony.'

Shah was eventually released.

Others include Mohammed Salim and Moazzam Begg.

== Investigation and prosecution ==
In October 2004, the U.S. Army Criminal Investigation Command concluded that there was probable cause to charge 27 officers and enlisted personnel with criminal offenses in the Dilawar case, ranging from dereliction of duty to maiming and involuntary manslaughter. Fifteen of the soldiers were also cited for probable criminal responsibility in the Habibullah case. Seven soldiers have been charged so far. According to an article published in the October 15, 2004, by The New York Times, 28 soldiers were under investigation. Some of the soldiers were reservists in the 377th Military Police Company under the command of Captain Christopher M. Beiring. The rest were in the 519th Military Intelligence Battalion under the command of Captain Carolyn A. Wood.

On October 14, 2004, the Criminal Investigation Command forwarded its report from its investigation to the commanders of 28 soldiers.

As of January 20, 2012, 17 soldiers have been charged (15 of which listed).

Soldier	Unit	Charges
Sgt. James P. Boland	377th MP	Charged in August 2004 with assault, maltreatment of a detainee, and dereliction of duty for alleged conduct in connection with treatment of a detainee on December 10, 2002, at Bagram. He was charged with a second specification of dereliction of duty in the death on December 3, 2002, of another detainee. All charges were dropped. He was given a letter of reprimand and eventually left the Army.
Spc. Brian Cammack	377th MP	Pled guilty on May 20, 2005, to charges of assault and two counts of making a false statement, and agreed to testify in related cases in exchange for a dismissal of the charge of maltreating detainees. Sentenced to three months in prison, reduction to the rank of private, and a bad-conduct discharge. Cammack claimed he hit Habibullah because Habibullah had spat on him.
Pfc. Willie V. Brand	377th MP	Charged with involuntary manslaughter, aggravated assault, simple assault, maiming, maltreatment, and making a false sworn statement. Convicted in August 2005, of assault, maltreatment, making a false sworn statement, and maiming, charges involving Dilawar. Acquitted on charges involving Habibullah. Reduced to the rank of private.
Sgt. Anthony Morden	377th MP	Charged with assault, maltreatment, and making a false official statement. Pleaded guilty. Sentenced to 75 days of confinement, reduction to the rank of private, and a bad-conduct discharge.
Sgt. Christopher W. Greatorex	377th MP	Acquitted of charges of abuse, maltreatment and making a false official statement.
Sgt. Darin M. Broady	377th MP	Acquitted of charges of assault, maltreatment and making a false official statement.
Capt. Christopher M. Beiring	377th MP	Charged with dereliction of duty and making a false official statement.; All charges dropped on 6 January 2006.; Given a letter of reprimand.
Staff Sgt. Brian L. Doyle	377th MP	Charged on October 13, 2005; Acquitted of dereliction of duty and maltreatment.
Sgt. Duane M. Grubb	377th MP	Accused of assault, maltreatment and making a false official statement. Prosecutors said Grubb repeatedly struck handicapped captive Zarif Khan with his knees. Grubb testified that he had never hit the prisoner. He was acquitted of all charges.
Sgt. Alan J. Driver	377th MP	Charged with assault.; Acquitted Thursday February 23, 2006.
Spc. Nathan Adam Jones	377th MP	Charged with assault, maltreatment and making a false official statement.; Given a letter of reprimand.
Spc. Glendale C. Walls	519th MI	Specialist Glendale C. Walls II was charged in early May 2005 with assault, maltreatment of a detainee, and failure to obey a lawful order. The charges stemmed from allegations of using abusive interrogation techniques at Bagram, Afghanistan. One of the detainees interrogated by Specialist Walls in December 2002 died a short time later at the detention facility. At trial in August 2005, Specialist Walls admitted to abusing the detainee and was sentenced to a reduction to E-1, two months of confinement, and a bad-conduct discharge.: Pled guilty on August 23, 2005.; Received a sentence of two months imprisonment.
Sgt. Selena M. Salcedo	519th MI	Charged in May 2005 with assault, dereliction of duty, and lying to investigators. Suspected of stepping on Dilawar's bare foot, grabbing his beard, kicking him, and then ordering the detainee to remain chained to the ceiling. At trial, Salcedo pleaded guilty and received a sentence of a one-grade reduction in rank, $1,000 fine, and a written reprimand.
Sgt. Joshua Claus	519th MI	Specialist Joshua R. Claus has been charged with assault, maltreatment of a detainee, and making a false statement to investigators for his participation in interrogations that led to the death of an Afghan detainee at Bagram in December 2002.: Charged May 17, 2005 with assault, maltreatment, and making a false statement.; Pled guilty and received a five-month prison sentence in 2005.
Pfc. Damien M. Corsetti	519th MI	Specialist Damien M. Corsetti remains under investigation for assault, maltreatment of detainees, and indecent acts related to abusive interrogation techniques used toward detainees at Bagram, Afghanistan. On 01 June 2006, PFC Corsetti was found not guilty of all charges. While serving at Abu Ghraib, SPC Corsetti allegedly forced an Iraqi woman to strip during questioning; he was fined and demoted.

=== Involved but uncharged ===
Some interrogators involved in this incident were sent to Iraq, and were assigned to Abu Ghraib prison. PFC Corsetti was fined and demoted while assigned to Abu Ghraib for not having permission to conduct an interrogation.

== Allegations of widespread abuse ==
A May 2005 editorial of The New York Times noted parallels between military behavior at Bagram and the later abuse and torture of prisoners at Abu Ghraib in Iraq:

What happened at Abu Ghraib was no aberration, but part of a widespread pattern. It showed the tragic impact of the initial decision by Mr. Bush and his top advisers that they were not going to follow the Geneva Conventions, or indeed American law, for prisoners taken in antiterrorist operations. The investigative file on Bagram, obtained by The Times, showed that the mistreatment of prisoners was routine: shackling them to the ceilings of their cells, depriving them of sleep, kicking and hitting them, sexually humiliating them and threatening them with guard dogs -- the very same behavior later repeated in Iraq.

Human Rights Watch has reported that detainees at Bagram are held in harsh conditions without access to due process, including torture, sleep deprivation, shackles, and other harsh treatment similar to other reports about military prisons. Amnesty International has expressed concern about the transfer of prisoners from Bagram to Afghan prisons, describing it as "exposing prisoners to torture and ill-treatment." The ACLU has stressed that the abuse at Bagram is systematic and requires full disclosure of prison conditions and accountability.

== United States government response ==
The United States government, through the Department of State submits periodic reports to the United Nations Committee Against Torture. In October 2005, the report focused on the pretrial detention of terrorism suspects in the war on terrorism, including those held at Guantanamo Bay detention camp and in Afghanistan. This report was particularly significant as it marked the first official response from the U.S. government to allegations of widespread abuse of prisoners in Afghanistan and facilities such as Guantanamo Bay. The report denied the allegations.

In 2010, Justice Project Pakistan began advocating for the repatriation of prisoners subjected to torture at Bagram. As a result, the U.S. government ultimately allowed all known prisoners to be return home by 2014. In the same year, the Bagram detention facility was officially transferred to Afghan authorities as part of the broader U.S. withdrawal from Afghanistan. The transfer was seen as part of broader efforts to address international criticism of U.S. detention practices. Although the formal handover occurred in 2013, the U.S. maintained some level of involvement in detention operations in Afghanistan until the complete withdrawal of U.S. forces in 2021.

=== McCain Amendment ===
The McCain Amendment, part of the Detainee Treatment Act of 2005, was an amendment to the United States Senate Department of Defence Authorization bill. Officially designated as Amendment #1977 it focused on (1) adherence to the U.S. Army Field Manual and (2) the prohibition of Cruel, Inhumane, Degrading Treatment, amendment #1977, and also known as the McCain Amendment 1977.

Introduced by Senator John McCain, the amendment aimed to ensure humane treatment of detainees. On October 5, 2005, the U.S. Senate overwhelmingly voted 90–9. It was later signed into law by President George W. Bush, reinforcing the U.S. commitment to humane interrogation and detention practises.

== Reports and statements from former prisoners ==
According to BBC interviews and reports, some 27 former detainees who were held at Bagram between 2002 and 2008 have claimed to have been subjected to beatings, threats with guns and dogs, extreme cold and heat, sleep deprivation and sexual humiliation. The detainees said none were held without formal charges or trial.

== Personal testimonies of former detainees ==
According to an interview with several former prisoners by the Anadolu Agency: One prisoner said that they had not received food for more than three days and were kept in cells with more than 30 people without the possibility of lying down. The sanitary conditions were very poor and the toilets and showers were described as so inadequate that prisoners questioned whether a human being could survive in such conditions. The prisoner had been in prison for more than seven years and had witnessed numerous tortures.

== Second secret prison ==
In May 2010, the BBC reported about nine prisoners who "told consistent stories of being held in isolation in cold cells where a light is on all day and night. The men said they had been deprived of sleep by US military personnel there." When the BBC sought information from the International Committee of the Red Cross about this, the ICRC revealed that it had been informed in August 2009, by U.S. authorities that they maintained a second facility at Bagram, commonly known as the Black Jail, where detainees were held in isolation due to "military necessity". This was an exception to the principle of allowing guaranteed access for all prisoners to the International Red Cross.

== Criticism and reaction from governments or international organizations ==
=== International and Afghan Government Responses ===
“The release of pictures of Iraqi prisoners has raised concerns among Afghans, fearing the same thing could happen to Afghan prisoners,” Ahmad Zia Langari of the independent Human Rights Commission said. The commission has written to the commander of US forces in Afghanistan, Lieutenant General David Barno, requesting access to all US military holding facilities, including the detention centre at their Bagram airbase headquarters.

== Allegations and personal accounts ==
Prisoners have said they were beaten by guards with sticks or threatened with dogs, and in some cases deprived of sleep for long periods. Some interviews have reported that prisoners were forced to strip naked in front of female soldiers and threatened with weapons. The use of cold water in winter and extremely high temperatures in summer to create harsh conditions are other allegations made by prisoners.

== Investigative journalism findings ==
=== Media analyses of the extent of abuse ===
A Guardian/McClatchy investigation found: Of the 41 former detainees interviewed, 28 said they had been beaten or otherwise abused. Many of these detainees had no significant connection to the 9/11 attacks or terrorist groups. Administrative orders and military regulations to limit abuse were not being implemented in practice at Bagram.

== International law issues and the Geneva Conventions ==
=== Legal issues ===
Analysis has shown that the treatment of prisoners at Bagram may be in violation of the 1949 Geneva Convention, which prohibits torture and degrading treatment, while at the time the US government refused to grant many prisoners of war status.

== Enhanced interrogation practices and psychological stress techniques ==
Independent reports have shown that in the early years of Bagram detention, specific methods of torture and psychological degradation were used: Detainees were forced to stand or kneel for long periods of time during interrogations in bright light and were deprived of sleep. Detainees have said that they were held for weeks without rest and in bright light, causing physical and psychological harm. These methods bore similarities to those reported at other facilities, such as those in Iraq.

== Criticism and Disclosure Requests by Human Rights Organizations ==
In addition to the two high-profile deaths (Dilawar and Habibullah) in 2002, Human Rights Watch reported in 2005 that at least six other people died in U.S. custody in Afghanistan, many of them at the Bagram facility. These deaths have been described in internal Human Rights Watch documents as “outright killings” that have not been seriously investigated or publicly investigated. The same reports have said that military and intelligence officials were aware of the patterns of abuse but did not prevent them.

ACLU staff attorney Jonathan Hafetz said, "Torture and abuse at Bagram is further evidence that prisoner abuse in U.S. custody was systemic, not aberrational, and originated at the highest levels of government. We must learn the truth about what went wrong, hold the proper people accountable and make sure these failed policies are not continued or repeated." In April 2009 the ACLU filed a Freedom of Information Act (FOIA) seeking the disclosure of the names, nationalities, places of arrest, and length of detention of prisoners, as well as "records pertaining to the process afforded those prisoners to challenge their detention and designation as 'enemy combatants'".

== Closure ==
The facility officially shut down on December 10, 2014.

== Film ==
The 2007 documentary Taxi to the Dark Side (2007), directed by American filmmaker Alex Gibney, focuses on the murder of Dilawar by US troops at Bagram.

== See also ==
- Abu Ghraib torture and prisoner abuse
- Abuse
- Canadian Afghan detainee abuse scandal
- Command responsibility
- Criticism of the war on terrorism
- Enhanced interrogation
- Iraq prison abuse scandals
- International public opinion on the war in Afghanistan
- Military abuse
- Opposition to the War in Afghanistan (2001–2021)
- Prisoner abuse
- Protests against the invasion of Afghanistan
- Qur'an desecration controversy of 2005
- The Salt Pit
- Torture
- Torture and the United States
- Use of torture since 1948
- War in Afghanistan (2001–2021)
- July 2005 Afghan captive incident
