= Zia Rahman =

- Arrested: 2008-12-09; Jalalabad; Afghan National Army
- Citizenship: Afghanistan
- Detained at: Bagram
- Other name: "Hamid"
- ISN: 3887
- Charge(s): no charge, extrajudicial detention

Zia Rahman is a citizen of Afghanistan held in extrajudicial detention in the United States' Bagram Theater Internment Facility. On January 15, 2010, the Department of Defense complied with a court order and published a list of Captives held in the Bagram Theater Internment Facility that included his name. There were 645 names on the list, which was dated September 22, 2009, and was heavily redacted.

Zia Rahman or another individual named Zia Rahman was reported by U.S. Forces Afghanistan to have been captured in a Taliban safe house in Jalalabad, based on a tip he was involved in a plot to assassinate the Provincial Governor. He was described as a "suicide IED facilitator", who had the chemical residue of explosives on his hands. Rahman was alleged to have prepared bombs and mines used in several previous attacks, including one in November 2008 that killed a US soldier.
