= Gul Mohammed (disambiguation) =

Gul Mohammed of New Delhi, India once held the Guinness world record as shortest adult human being whose existence and height have been independently verified.

Gul Mohammed may also refer to:

- Gul Mohammed (habeas petitioner), a citizen of Afghanistan held in Bagram who was part of Ghulam Mohammed v. Donald Rumsfeld
- Mullah Gul Mohammed Jangvi, (also known as Gul Mohammed), a senior Taliban commander who was also held in Bagram in 2003

== See also ==
- Mohammad Gul (disambiguation)
