= Rohullah (Bagram detainee) =

Haji Rohullah (born c. 1967) is a citizen of Afghanistan held in the United States' Bagram Theater detention facility, in Afghanistan. Rohullah worked as a driver before being seized at his farm in Jalalabad in August 2006.

== Identity ==
A captive was held in the United States' Guantanamo Bay detention camp in Cuba, named Sahib Rohullah Wakil, a member of Afghanistan's legislature, who is also known as "Haji Rohullah". On January 16, 2010, the Department of Defense was forced to publish the names of the 645 captives held in the Bagram Theater Internment Facility. Three of the individuals on the list were named Rohullah. The list distinguished between them solely by a sequence number: 003417, 003830, and 003841.

== Capture and detention ==
When Rohullah's writ of habeas corpus was first filed, in 2006, it stated he had been captured in his home a year earlier. Eleven other men were captured at the same time, but they were all released.

== Ruzatullah v. Gates ==
Rohullah is one of the first enemy combatants held by the USA in a detention facility in Afghanistan who has been held able to mount a challenge to his detention through the US court system. Rohullah, and another Afghan, Ruzatullah, had a writ of habeas corpus submitted on their behalf in November 2006. On August 10, 2007 Rohullah's lawyers submitted a motion requiring the United States Department of Defense give thirty days' advance notice if they planned to transfer him from US custody to Afghan custody. They informed the court that Ruzatullah was quietly transferred out of US jurisdiction, without any notice, in June 2007.

The arguments in the motion were:

1. Petitioner Rohullah Will Suffer Irreparable Harm if He is Transferred Without Notice or an Opportunity to be Heard
  1. Petitioner Ruzatullah Faces the Threat of Irreparable Harm Based on the Potential Loss of his Habeas Claims
  2. Petitioner Rohoullah Faces the Substantial Threat of Torture
2. Petitioner Rohullah Has a Substantial Likelihood of Success on the Merits
3. The Requested Relief Will Not Harm Respondents
4. Public Policy Unequivocally Favors the Granting of Petitioner's Request

Rohullah and Ruzatullah are represented by A. Katherine Toomey, Eric L. Lewis and Dwight P. Bostwick of Baach, Robinson & Lewis and Tina Foster of the International Justice Network.

Jean Lin, a Justice Department attorney, had characterized the motion as ab "extraordinary and drastic remedy." Lin had argued the motion would: "... interfere directly with the executive's conduct of war-making and foreign policy."

On October 4, 2007 U.S. district court judge Gladys Kessler ruled in Rohullah's favor that the DoD had to give his lawyer's thirty days advance notice of plans to transfer him from US custody.

On December 2, 2008 Sandra Hodgkinson, who was then the Deputy Assistant Secretary of Defense for Detainee Affairs, had a letter to the editor published in American Law, responding to Daphne Eviatar's article on Bagram captivity.
