= Sayed Gulab =

- Arrested: 2007-05-24; Pachir Wa Agam, Nangarhar; Afghan Border Police
- Detained at: Bagram
- ISN: 2521
- Alleged to be a member of: alleged Taliban leader
- Charge(s): no charge, extrajudicial detention

On January 15, 2010, the Department of Defense complied with a court order and published a list of Captives held in the Bagram Theater Internment Facility that included the name Sayed Gulab.

There were 645 names on the list, which was dated September 22, 2009, and was heavily redacted.

According to historian Andy Worthington, author of The Guantanamo Files, he was captured in Nangarhar Province on May 24, 2007, by Afghan Border Police. He was described as a "Taliban leader" and "an improvised explosive device facilitator".
