= Lagha =

Lagha is an Arabic surname. Notable people with the surname include:

- Khelil Lagha, Tunisian chess master
- Lufti Bin Swei Lagha (born 1968), citizen of Tunisia who was held in extrajudicial detention
- Zachary Lagha (born 1999), Canadian ice dancer
- Yannis Lagha, French-born footballer
