= Hamidullah (Bagram detainee) =

Citizen of Afghanistan held in extrajudicial detention

- Born: 1967 (age 58–59)
- Arrested: 2009-06; Kandahar; American
- Released: 2009-10
- Citizenship: Afghanistan
- Detained at: the black jail, Bagram
- Other name: Haji Lala
- Charge: no charge (extrajudicial detention)

Hamidullah (born 1967) is a citizen of Afghanistan who was held in extrajudicial detention in the United States' Bagram Theater Internment Facility. He was interviewed by The New York Times in November 2007, and gave an account of his detention, first in "the black prison" and then in Bagram. On November 28, 2009, Allisa J. Rubin published an article in The New York Times which reported on Hamidullah's description of his detention.

Rubin reported that Hamidullah was a car parts dealer. He said he was captured in June 2009, and held until October 2009, and that he spent his first six weeks in the "black jail", a secret annex to the main Bagram facility, where interrogation techniques like sleep deprivation, prohibited under the Detainee Treatment Act of 2005, were still practiced.

Rubin reported that Hamidullah described being subjected to sleep deprivation, but that while he could hear other detainees being beaten, and screaming while they were being beaten, he was not beaten himself. He said that detainees had no access to natural light, were made to wear opaque googles, earmuffs and shackles, when being moved around, and weren't allowed to know what time it was, so they didn't know when to pray.

Hamidullah described being apprehended when his house was raided at 11:30 pm, one night in June 2009. He and a guest were both taken away. The Americans came in three helicopters, but only one landed.

He spent 37 days in "the black prison", a prison where detainees were disoriented and sleep deprived, by loud noises, and the lack of any natural light. He couldn't bring himself to eat the American food served there. He said that while he wasn't beaten there, other detainees were:

The black jail was the most dangerous and fearful place. It is a place where everybody is afraid. In the black jail, they can do anything to detainees. They don't let the I.C.R.C. officials or any other civilians see or communicate with the people they keep there.

Hamidullah said the black prison was also called "Tor Jail".

Hamidullah said his interrogators believed he was Faida Mohammed, because they both shared the nickname "Haji Lala". He didn't know Faida Mohammed personally, only by reputation. He knew he had been a Taliban official, prior to the Taliban's collapse, but he knew nothing about his subsequent activities.

Hamidullah told The New York Times he was only interrogated twice after his transfer to Bagram.

== Release ==
He was released in 2009.
