= Sher Agha =

There are multiple Afghans named Sher Agha.

Sher Agha: Member of the Loya Jirga.; Alleged HIG commander	Guantanamo captive Nasrullah's continued detention is justified, in part, due to his ties to Sher Agha. The allegations against Nasrullah state that Sher Agha had served as a commander in the anti-Soviet militia Hizb-I Islami Gulbuddin, during the struggle against Afghanistan's Soviet occupiers.; Sher Agha was one of five Loya Jirga members selected to serve as a representative of the Afghan refugees in Iran. In early June 2002, when he and the other four representatives arrived, they found that they had been replaced by other appointees.
Sher Agha demining engineer	An engineer named Sher Agha worked on the clearance of old land mines in 2002.
Sher Agha Omar; Zoo Director	The director of the Kabul Zoo, in 2002, was named Sher Agha Omar.
Sher Agha; Bagram captive	Three individuals named Sher Agha were named on a list of Captives held in the Bagram Theater Internment Facility published on January 16, 2010.

- Sher Agha
  UK Music Producer Works with Global artists and co-written Big White Room for Jessie-J. He is AKA Shai Sevin.
