= Mohammad Gul =

Mohammad Gul may refer to:

- Mohammad Gul (Helmand Council), elected to the Provincial Council in Helmand Province
- Mohammad Gul (Guantanamo captive 457), Afghan sent to Guantanamo
- Mohammed Gul (Taliban leader), Pakistani from Waziristan alleged to have ties to the Taliban
- Muhammad Gul, Pakistani wrestler

== See also ==
- Gul Mohammad, Pakistani cricketer
- Gul Mohammed, said to have been the shortest man in the world
