= Lufti Bin Swei Lagha =

- Born: November 28, 1968 (age 57); Tunis, Tunisia
- Detained at: Kandahar, Bagram, Guantanamo
- Other name: Lotfi Lagha
- ISN: 660

Lufti Bin Swei Lagha is a citizen of Tunisia who was held in extrajudicial detention in the United States's Guantanamo Bay detention camps, in Cuba. The Department of Defense reports that he was born on November 28, 1968, in Tunis, Tunisia.

== Background ==
According to historian Andy Worthington, author of The Guantanamo Files, Lagha had lived for a time in Italy, prior to traveling to Afghanistan. According to Worthington, Tajik captive Airat Vakhitov asserted medical staff in Kandahar unnecessarily amputated eleven of Lagha's fingers and toes, and then beat the stubs when they participated in his interrogation.

After his repatriation from Guantanamo Lufti Lagha stood trial in Tunisia, was convicted, and sentenced to three years imprisonment, for "associating with a criminal group with the aim of harming or causing damage in Tunisia.

== Official status reviews ==
=== Formerly secret Joint Task Force Guantanamo assessment ===
On April 25, 2011, whistleblower organization WikiLeaks published formerly secret assessments drafted by Joint Task Force Guantanamo analysts. Lagha's assessment was four pages long. It was drafted on September 10, 2004, and signed by camp commandant Jay W. Hood. According to The Telegraph,

"JTF GTMO recommends this detainee be transferred for continued detention to his country of origin (Tunisia) if a satisfactory agreement can be reached that allows access to detainee and/or access to exploited intelligence."

== Repatriation ==
A Tunisian named Lotfi Lagha was repatriated from Guantanamo to Tunisian custody in late June 2007. Bouazza ben Bouazza, of the Associated Press reports that Lofti Lagha was held in the Bagram Theater detention facility for several months in early 2002, prior to transfer to Guantanamo. Lofti Lagha reports that his all eight of his fingers were amputated, against his will, while in American custody at Bagram, even though Pakistani doctors told him amputation was unnecessary. He reports that American soldiers beat him and kicked him, when he awoke from the operation.

Lufti Lagha was held in a prison in Mornaguia "on charges of associating with a criminal group."

On September 2, 2007, Jennifer Daskal, writing in The Washington Post, reported that Lufti Lagha, and another repatriated Tunisian were "...telling visitors that things are so bad they would rather be back at Guantanamo Bay."

Daskall wrote that Lufti Lagha had been held in solitary confinement from June 21, 2007, to August 7, 2007, even though the Tunisian Civil Code only allows solitary confinement for ten days or less, and in spite of the Tunisian governments assurance to the US State Department that the captive would be treated humanely upon their return.

== Trial and conviction ==
Lufti Lagha was convicted on Wednesday October 24, 2007, of "associating with a criminal group with the aim of harming or causing damage in Tunisia." Several other charges were dropped. The Associated Press notes: "Authorities did not name the group that Lagha was said to participate in or specify what its planned violence was." The Associated Press notes that his hands were still bandaged in 2007, five years after his fingers were amputated.

Lufti Lagha's lawyer, Samir Ben Amor, said that he had been beaten both in Guantanamo, and upon his return to Tunisia. Cynthia Smith did not respond to the specific allegations that Lofti Lagha was abused, but repeated that all US captives were treated humanely.
