= Haji Wazir (Bagram detainee) =

Wazir
- Arrested: 2002; United Arab Emirates
- Citizenship: Afghanistan
- Detained at: Bagram Theater Internment Facility
- Charge: No charge
- Status: Held in extrajudicial detention (his habeas corpus petition was dismissed)

Haji Wazir is a citizen of Afghanistan who was taken into custody in Dubai, United Arab Emirates in 2002, and has, since then, been held in extrajudicial detention as an enemy combatant in the United States' Bagram Theater internment facility. He is notable because he is one of the very few detainees in Bagram who has had a writ of habeas corpus filed on his behalf.

The US government falsely claimed in a motion to dismiss his habeas corpus petition that Wazir was detained in Karachi, Pakistan, but later corrected itself in a January 2009 legal filing, though public documents redact the location he was listed as truly being detained. They contended that the location of his detainment would not have any effect on his lack of legal rights, which they argue is due to his non-citizen status.

According to Lal Gul, chairman of the Afghan Human Rights Organization, Haji Wazir: "is not a commander, not a member of the Taliban or al-Qaeda. He is a businessman."

Wazir is one of the sixteen Guantanamo captives whose amalgamated habeas corpus submissions were heard by US District Court Judge Reggie B. Walton on January 31, 2007. Released detainee Jawed Ahmad, an Afghan reporter, said that during his imprisonment at Bagram from 2007 to 2008, he shared a cell with Wazir for 5 months. During that time, he says that Wazir described being tortured in the first 6 months of his detention.

On June 29, 2009 US District Court Judge John D. Bates ruled that Wazir, unlike non-Afghans held in Bagram, was not entitled to pursue his habeas corpus petition.

== Personal life ==
Wazir reportedly has seven children and ran a foreign currency exchange business in Afghanistan and Dubai. As of February 2009, he was 50 years old.
