= Ameen Mohammad Albakri =

Bagram Theater Internment Facility detainee

Ameen Mohammad Albkri
- Born: 1969 (age 56–57)
- Arrested: 2003; Thailand; CIA
- Citizenship: Yemen
- Detained at: Bagram Theater Internment Facility
- Other name: Amin al-Bakri
- Charge(s): no charge, extrajudicial detention
- Occupation: jeweler

Ameen Mohammad Albakri (أمين محمد البكري; born 1969) was held in extrajudicial detention in the United States Bagram Theater Internment Facility.

The New York Times reports that Ameen had been held in the facility since 2003, and that he had been held in secret extrajudicial detention in the CIA's network of black sites, prior to his transfer to Bagram. In 2008, the Yafie tribe of Yemen declared their "solidarity" with al-Bakri, and petitioned President Ali Abdullah Saleh to recognise his constitutional duty to demand the release of al-Bakri to Yemeni authorities.

According to a habeas corpus petition filed on his behalf he was held in CIA custody for six months, in 2003, prior to being transferred to Bagram.

Though only Respondents know where Mr. Al Bakri was held during the first six months of his detention, it is likely that he was held in one or more CIA “black sites,” where agents of the United States subjected him to torture, including terrorization with dogs, electric shocks, beatings with rifle butts, prolonged suspension, stress positions, and solitary confinement in “dog boxes.”

== Life and arrest ==
Born in al-Menorah, al-Bakri married and had two sons and a daughter. He became a shrimp merchant, who also dealt in gemstones.

He disappeared while on a business trip to Bangkok, and his family anxiously contact authorities for six months about his disappearance, until an article in Al-Sharq Al-Awsat reported that he had been kidnapped by American agents.

His brothers hired private investigators to trace his location, and were given a report that he had arrived in Bangkok and checked into a hotel, before disappearing.

A year after his disappearance, his family received a letter from the Red Cross informing them that they had visited al-Bakri at Bagram Airbase and he was in good health, and hoped his family would take care of his three children.

== Habeas corpus submissions ==
Ameen Mohammad Albkri is one of the sixteen Guantanamo captives whose amalgamated habeas corpus submissions were heard by US District Court Judge Reggie B. Walton on January 31, 2007.

On April 2, 2009 US District Court Judge John D. Bates ruled that Ameen, and several other captives held in Bagram, who were not captured in Afghanistan, were entitled to the same access to habeas corpus and other protections of the United States Civilian Justice system as those accorded to the captives held in the Guantanamo Bay detention camps, in Cuba.

Ramzi Kassem, a law professor at City University of New York, who volunteered to work on Ameen's behalf, has called for the original Bagram facility to be preserved as a crime scene. According to The New York Times, Kassem explained his call for the preservation of Bagram: "What took place at Bagram is at the heart of many, if not most, Guantanamo cases. That facility is relevant to accounts of torture and coercion raised by many (Guantanamo Bay) prisoners -- and by present Bagram prisoners -- in their various cases before the military commissions and in criminal and habeas proceedings in federal court." A new facility to replace the interim facility, which has been in use since 2001, was recently completed, and the current captives are planned to have been transferred to it by January 16, 2009. The DoD plans to demolish the hangars the old facility was housed in, in order to build a new headquarters.
