= Dilshad =

Dilshad is both a given name and a surname. Notable people with the name include:

- Ahmad Dilshad, Pakistani prisoner
- Dilshad (1800-1900?), Central Asian poet and historian
- Dilshad Akhtar (died 1996), Indian singer
- Dilshad Aliyarli (born 1962), Azerbaijani journalist
- Dilshad Khan (born 1941), Indian singer
- Dilshad Khatun (died 1351), Chobanid princess
- Dilshad Meriwani (1947–1989), Kurdish poet
- Dilshad Nahar Kona (born 1981), Bangladeshi singer
- Dilshad Najmuddin (1933–2018), Pakistani investigative official
- Dilshad Said (born 1958), Kurdish musician
- Dilshad Vadsaria (born c. 1985), Pakistani-born American actress
- Mirza Dilshad Beg (died 1998), Nepali parliamentarian
- Mohomed Dilshad (born 1992), Sri Lankan cricketer
