= Khail =

Khail may refer to:

== People ==
- Pope Michael I of Alexandria (Khail I) (ruled 743–767)
- Pope Michael II of Alexandria (Khail II) (ruled 849–851)
- Pope Michael III of Alexandria (Khail III) (ruled 880–907)
- Pope Michael IV of Alexandria (Khail IV) (ruled 1092–1102)
- Hafizullah Shabaz Khail (born 1946)
- Mohammed bin Ali Aba Al Khail (born 1935), Saudi Arabian government official

== Places ==
- Tari Khail, Pakistan
