= Tina Monshipour Foster =

Iranian-American lawyer

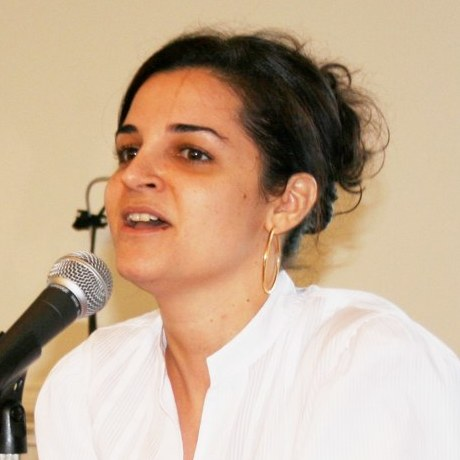
Tina Monshipour Foster in 2008

Tina Monshipour Foster is an Iranian-American lawyer and director of the International Justice Network.

== Legal career ==
Prior to working in the field of human rights, Foster worked at Clifford Chance LLP in New York City. She later worked for the Center for Constitutional Rights (CCR) on Guantanamo Bay cases and is one of the plaintiffs in CCR v. Bush, filed on July 9, 2007. Four other individuals filed this suit. Foster and her colleagues sued the US government objecting to the government's interception of their mail, email and phone calls. In 2006 Foster started International Justice Network (IJNetwork) placing focus on detainees held without charge, incommunicado in Bagram Prison in Afghanistan.

== Human rights ==
Foster submitted a writ of habeas corpus Ruzatullah v. Robert Gates -- 06-CV-01707 on behalf of Ruzatullah a captive held in the Bagram Theater internment facility.

The Washington Post reported on June 29, 2008 on comments Foster made about Jawed Ahmad's detention in Bagram.

It provides a convenient place to hold people who you might not want the world to know you are holding.

On July 20, 2008, Reuters reported the outrage Human Rights organizations are expressing over the seizing of journalists in Afghanistan and elsewhere in the "war on terror". Foster was quoted as saying "there were no charges against Jawed, who was wounded while serving with U.S. Special Forces. He has not been accused of any crime either under U.S. law, Afghan law or international law," adding that "Jawed, like other detainees held by U.S., was regarded by Washington as an "enemy combatant". Foster, executive director for International Justice Network, said there were no charges against Jawed, who was wounded while serving with U.S. Special Forces.

=== Comments on the new plans for Bagram review ===
On September 12, 2009 it was widely reported that unnamed officials told Eric Schmitt of the New York Times that the Obama administration was going to introduce new procedures that would allow the captives held in Bagram, and elsewhere in Afghanistan, to have their detention reviewed. Josh Gerstein, of Politico, reported that Foster, who represents four Bagram captives, was critical of the new rules:

These sound almost exactly like the rules the Bush Administration crafted for Guanatmamo that were struck down by the Supreme Court or at least found to be an inadequate substitute for judicial review. They're adopting this thing that [former Vice President] Cheney and his lot dreamt up out of whole cloth. To adopt Gitmo-like procedures seems to me like sliding in the wrong direction.

=== Comments on the Senate Intelligence Committee's report on torture ===
On December 15, 2014, the Washington Post published an op-ed by Foster after the United States Senate Intelligence Committee published a 600-page unclassified summary of its classified report on the CIA's use of torture. Foster described how the report devoted a whole section to the CIA's torture of one of her clients, Redha al-Najar. She listed all the torture techniques the CIA used on him, and asserted that the CIA tortured him for nearly 700 days.
