= Jawed Ahmad =

Afghan reporter (1986–2009)

Javed Yazamy
- Born: 1986
- Arrested: October 206, 2007; Kandahar; USA
- Released: September 22, 2008
- Died: March 10, 2009 (aged 22–23); Kandahar
- Citizenship: Afghanistan
- Detained at: Kandahar Internment Facility; Bagram Theater Internment Facility
- Other names: Jawed Ahmad; Jojo Yazemi
- ISN: Bagram 3370
- Status: Classified as an "enemy combatant" in February 2008.

Jawed Ahmad (1986 – March 10, 2009) also known as "Jojo" was an Afghan reporter working for Canadian media outlet CTV who was arrested by American troops and declared an enemy combatant, while working with NATO at Kandahar Airport on October 26, 2007.

Ahmad was then held in military custody at the detention facility at the United States Air Base in Bagram, Afghanistan for 11 months without access to a lawyer. As a result of advocacy by his friends and family, and a habeas corpus petition filed by the International Justice Network, Jojo was released on September 21, 2008 after almost a year of being held in U.S. custody.

== Early life ==
Jawed started working as a tailor's apprentice at twelve years old. Jawed earned 75 cents a day. He used the money he earned to pay for schooling. His education, and language skills, allowed him to start working as a translator for United States forces shortly after the overthrow of the Taliban.

Jawed was later to work for independent security firms.

In 2006 Jawad started working as a translator and "fixer" for Canadian journalists.

== Capture ==
Jawed was captured on October 26, 2007. Jawed reported on his release that he was captured after receiving a request to come to Kandahar Air Field to complete a survey on opinion survey of Afghan journalists from a GI who represented himself as a Public Affairs Officer.

American officials claimed the 22-year-old native of Kandahar was carrying phone numbers and videos of Taliban officials.

He appeared before a military review, which determined there was "credible information" and is held at Bagram Airbase.

His brother, Siddique, has been in contact with him during his detention, due to the efforts of the International Red Cross. According to his brother, he has been beaten since being detained.

Captives in the Bagram Theater Detention Facility do not have Combatant Status Review Tribunals convened to confirm their combatant status. According to Eliza Griswold in The New Republic their status is determined by the base commander, who may convene a more secret, less formal, less thorough procedure called an "Enemy Combatant Review Board". According to Grizwold:

Prisoners don't even have the limited access to lawyers available to prisoners in Guantánamo. Nor do they have the right to Combatant Status Review Tribunals, which Guantánamo detainees won in the 2004 Supreme Court ruling in Hamdi v. Rumsfeld. Instead, if a combat commander chooses, he can convene an Enemy Combatant Review Board (ECRB), at which the detainee has no right to a personal advocate, no chance to speak in his own defense, and no opportunity to review the evidence against him. The detainee isn't even allowed to attend. And, thanks to such limited access to justice, many former detainees say they have no idea why they were either detained or released.

The Washington Post reported on June 29, 2008 on comments Tina Monshipour Foster made about Jawed Ahmad's detention in Bagram.

It provides a convenient place to hold people who you might not want the world to know you are holding.

== Release ==
Jawad Ahmad was released, without explanation, on September 22, 2008. He credited the help of friends and supporters for his relatively early release, and said guards had told him that many people were lobbying on his behalf.

Jawad said he had seen the documentary film The Road to Guantanamo and said he was subjected to the same kind of treatment as the captives whose homicides in US custody were described in the film. He described being hooded, bound, slammed into walls and beaten. One of the beatings broke two of his ribs. Jawad said he was subjected to sleep deprivation. In an interview with the BBC he states "When I landed first of all they stood me in snow for six hours, it was too cold - I had no socks, no shoes, nothing. I became unconscious two times.".

Jawad said his interrogators insisted he was a spy for the Taliban, Iran and Pakistan, that his family had all been captured and had already confessed, and that he was being held because his Canadian employers had insisted on it.

After his release, Jawad told journalists that he was told he was going to be sent to Guantanamo. Jawad reported that Koran desecration remained routine at Bagram.

== Death ==
On March 10, 2009, Reporters Without Borders (RWB) issued a statement saying Jawad was killed by being "gunned down .... by two men in a vehicle as he was getting out of his own car in the centre of the southern city of Kandahar." The statement said, "Several Afghan journalists told Reporters Without Borders they suspected the murder may have been ordered by the Taliban," but a Kandahar provincial government spokesman "offered no details." The statement also said Ahmad's brother "did not rule out any hypothesis" regarding a motive for the shooting.

== See also ==
- Bagram torture and prisoner abuse
