= Ruzatullah =

- Arrested: October 2004
- Detained at: BTIF
- Charge(s): no charge, held in extrajudicial detention
- Status: transferred to the American built "National Security" wing at Pul-e-Charkhi prison
- Occupation: farmer

Ruzatullah is a citizen of Afghanistan who was held in United States' custody in its Bagram Theater Internment Facility, in Afghanistan.

Ruzatullah is notable for being one of the first captives held by the US in extrajudicial detention in Afghanistan to have a writ of habeas corpus filed on his behalf.

== Capture ==
Eric Lewis, one of Ruzatullah's attorneys, wrote in Slate magazine in August 2007, that Ruzatullah and his brother were captured two and a half years earlier.

== Ruzatullah v. Gates ==
Ruzatullah, and Hajji Rohullah, two men held in extrajudicial detention in Bagram had a writ of habeas corpus. Ruzatullah v. Gates, filed on their behalf on October 2, 2006. As of December 2007 lawyers for the petitioners and the respondent had filed a total of 38 sets of documents.

Mark Berman, one of the attorneys for Ali Saleh Kahlah Al-Marri, the only "enemy combatant" detained in the continental USA, wrote that the Military Commissions Act opened access to the DC Court of appeals to American captives held outside of Guantanamo.

== Transfer to Pul-e-Charkhi prison ==
On June 7, 2007, without any advance notice, the Department of Defense transferred Ruzatullah to the Pul-e-Charkhi prison. They argued that since the Pul-e-Charkhi prison is an Afghan prison, with Afghan guards, Ruzatullah is in Afghan custody, and is no longer under the control of the US.

Eric Lewis's response to that argument is that Ruzatullah, and close to one hundred other captives in US custody were transferred to a new US-built wing of the prison, guarded by Afghans who were hired by, and trained by US personnel, and that the control room is staffed by US personnel, these captives are in Afghan custody in name only. He questioned whether Afghan courts would not be allowed to set these men free.

Lewis wrote that Ruzatullah's family had been allowed to visit him in Pul-e-Charkhi, and that they found him erratic and argumentative.
