= Killing of Abdul Wahid =

Afghan detainee at Bagram

Abdul Wahid was a citizen of Afghanistan whose autopsy was held in the United States's Bagram Theater detention facility. He was beaten to death on November 6, 2003.

Army pathologist Colonel Kathleen Ingwersen concluded his death was a homicide. She wrote on his death certificate that he died from "Multiple blunt force injuries complicated by probable rhabdomyolysis [extensive crush injuries of the muscles]."

Abdul Wahid's cousin Abdul Haleem reported that he was also apprehended, and tortured, on November 3, 2003. He and Abdul Wahid's father attributed the abuse to Afghan soldiers, but said American soldiers were aware of the abuse, and didn't intervene.

Abdul Wahid's father said his heavily scarred body was returned to his family two months after his capture, together with a letter from US authorities. According to the Associated Press:

He said the letter – which a local doctor translated for him – expressed regret over the death but said Wahid had died before the United States had "got him". The U.S. military could not verify this information.

Human rights worker John Sifton, of Human Rights Watch, told the Associated Press that corrupt security officials in Afghanistan routinely captured men, and threatened to hand them over to the US in return for a bounty, unless they paid a bribe.

On January 16, 2010, the Department of Defense was forced to publish the names of the 645 captives held in the Bagram Theater Internment Facility. One of the individuals on the list was named "Abdul Wahid".
