= Khalid al-Asmr =

Jordanian Guantanamo detainee

Khalid Mahomoud Abdul Wahab Al Asmr Arabic: خالد محمود عبدالوهاب الأسمر
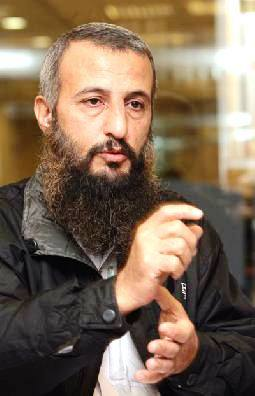
- Born: December 16, 1963 (age 62); Irbid, Jordan
- Detained at: Guantanamo Bay camp
- ISN: 589
- Alleged to be a member of: al-Qaeda
- Charge: No charge (extrajudicial detention)
- Status: Released
- Children: Al-asmr is a father of eight: Abdel rahman - November 6, 1988 (age 38); Aisha - December 9, 1990 (age 35); Abdullah - April 21, 1993 (age 33); Mariam - November 16, 1995 (age 31); Asia - June 24, 1997 (age 29); Yousef - December 2, 1999 (age 26); Yahia - August 2, 2001 (age 25); Osamah

Khalid Mahomoud Abdul Wahab Al Asmr (born December 16, 1963) is a citizen of Jordan who was held in extrajudicial detention in the United States Guantanamo Bay detainment camps, in Cuba.

Khalid Mahomoud Abdul Wahab al Asmr was captured in Pakistan in January 2002 and transferred to Jordan on July 19, 2005.

== Life ==
Born on December 16, 1963, in Irbid, al-Asmr moved to Pakistan in 1985, where he married two Afghan women. The following year he enrolled in Sheik Sanif camp for a single day, claiming he wanted to travel north for Humanitarian purposes and needed the survival training.

In 1987, he saw Osama bin Laden in passing, and claims to have not "met" him and only recognised him from a distance since he was a notable anti-Soviet financier.

A member of Jamat al-Tabligh, he later took a job working with Abdullah Azzam's widow, opening hospitals in Northern Afghanistan until January 1992.

== Press reports ==
Mother Jones magazine published an article based on interviews with the wife of al-Asmr. Fatima Abdulbagi said that her husband had traveled from Jordan to Afghanistan to fight Afghanistan's foreign invaders, during the Soviet occupation of Afghanistan. She described the flight of herself, Al Asmr, and their seven children, from the American bombing of Afghanistan, and their arrival in Pakistan. She reported that Al Asmr was picked up by Pakistani authorities the day before they were to return to Jordan.

== Determined not to have been an Enemy Combatant ==
The Washington Post reports that Al Asmr was one of 38 detainees who was determined not to have been an enemy combatant during his Combatant Status Review Tribunal. They report that Al Asmr has been released. The Department of Defense refers to these men as No Longer Enemy Combatants.

== McClatchy interview ==
On June 15, 2008 the McClatchy News Service published articles based on interviews with 66 former Guantanamo captives. McClatchy reporters interviewed Khaled al Asmr.

Khaled al Asmr described hearing his initial Pakistani captors negotiate a $5,000 bounty for him and six other captives, and that Americans immediately started beating him, while he was still hooded and bound, following his purchase.

Khaled al Asmr told McClatchy reporters American interrogators beat him in the Kandahar detention facility and Bagram Theater Internment Facility.

Khaled al Asmr told McClatchy reporters interrogators fondled his privates, which disturbed him more than the beatings.

Once they said, 'We will conduct a medical checkup.' They took me to a clinic, but instead of doing a checkup, a female soldier played with my sexual organs. When she was doing this, I prayed to God to help me, and my penis did not move."

Khaled al Asmr told McClatchy reporters that he had met Osama bin Laden during the 1980s, and had conversations with him, but he had no contact with him following the ouster of Afghanistan's Soviet occupiers. He acknowledged that he had a closer relationship with Abdullah Azzam than he had acknowledged to his interrogators, but repeated he had no contact with Azzam's organization since 1992.
