= Habibullah (Bagram detainee) =

Afghan Bagram detainee

Mullah Habibullah
- حبیب الله
- Born: 1972; Oruzgan Province, Afghanistan
- Died: December 4, 2002 (30); Parwan Detention Facility, Afghanistan
- Cause of death: Tortured to death
- Occupation: Clergyman
- Parent: Hajji Rahim Gul (father)
- Relatives: Unnamed former Taliban commander (brother)

Mullah Habibullah was an Afghan man who was tortured to death on December 4, 2002, while in US custody at Bagram Collection Point, a US military detention center in Afghanistan. His death was one of those ruled a homicide, though the initial military statement described his death as due to natural causes.

Habibullah's brother was a Taliban commander.Carlotta Gall, a New York Times reporter in Afghanistan, was the first to discover the story in 2003. Captain Carolyn Wood, commander of Alpha Company of the 519th Military Intelligence Battalion, and Captain Christopher Beiring, commander of the 377th Military Police Company, directed their troops at the Bagram Collection Point to confine their captives with their arms handcuffed above their heads in order to deprive them of sleep. Lt. Gen. Daniel K. McNeill was later quoted in the press denying that Bagram prisoners had been chained to the ceiling or held in chains attached to the ceiling. Their troops routinely kneed their captives in the side of their thighs. They called these "compliance blows". During a Criminal Investigation Division inquiry, their troops claimed they had been told—incorrectly—that this kind of blow was a legal, authorized use of force.

== Causes of death ==
Habibullah's autopsy was performed two days after his death, which was ruled a homicide. Dr. Kathleen Ingwersen, the military pathologist who performed the autopsy, said the cause of death was "pulmonary embolism due to blunt force injury to the legs." This did not prevent the GIs staffing the prison from continuing to use these "compliance blows", and a second Afghan man, 22-year-old Dilawar, died four days later, on December 10, 2002, under practically identical circumstances. Dr. Elizabeth Rouse, the coroner for Dilawar, said she had seen similar damage to a man whose legs had been run over by a bus.

== Prosecutions ==
By 2005, at least 15 American soldiers had been recommended for prosecution by Army investigators for abuse of detainees at Bagram. At least five of the soldiers were charged with crimes involving Habibullah's treatment. Captain Christopher Beiring was charged with dereliction of duty and making false statements; the charges were dropped, but he was reprimanded. Sgt. Christopher Greatorex was tried on charges of abuse, maltreatment, and making false statements; he was acquitted on September 7, 2005. Sgt. Darin Broady was tried on charges of abuse and acquitted on September 9, 2005. Specialist Brian Cammack pleaded guilty to charges of assault and making false statements; he was sentenced to three months in jail, a fine, reduced in rank to private, and given a bad conduct discharge. Pfc. Willie Brand was convicted of other charges, but acquitted of charges relating to abuse of Habibullah.
