= Mohammad Gul (Helmand Council) =

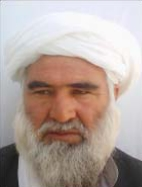
- Mohammad Gul
- Occupation: legislator

Hajji Mohammad Gul was elected to the Helmand Provincial Council in 2005.
