= Eric Schmitt (journalist) =

American journalist (born 1959)

- Eric P. Schmitt
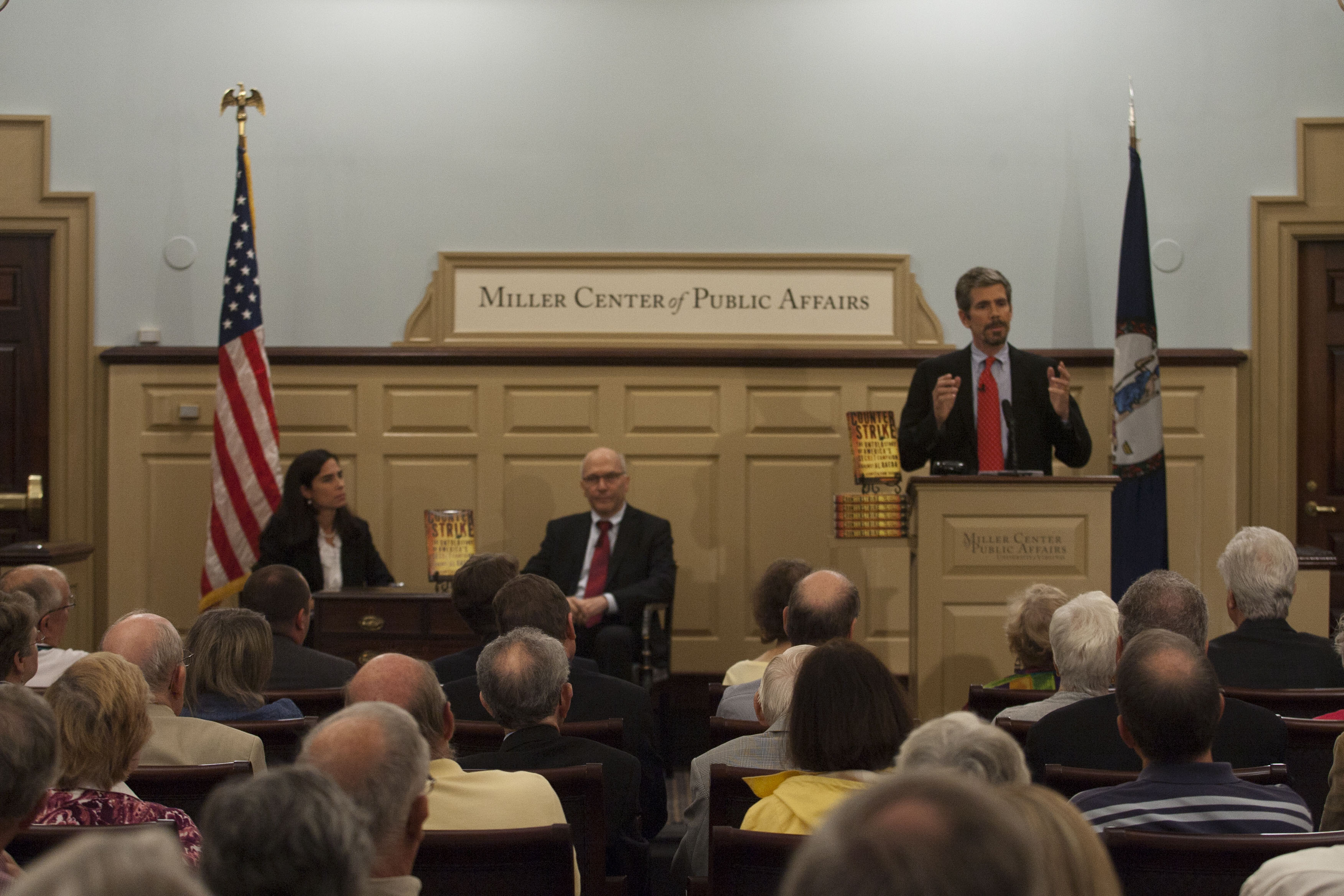
- Schmitt is on the right
- Born: November 2, 1959
- Education: Williams College
- Occupation: Journalist
- Awards: Pulitzer Prize for International Reporting (1999); Pulitzer Prize for International Reporting (2009); Pulitzer Prize for International Reporting (2017); Pulitzer Prize for International Reporting (2022)

Eric P. Schmitt (born November 2, 1959) is an American journalist who writes for The New York Times. He has shared four Pulitzer Prizes.

== Biography ==
Schmitt was born in Minneapolis, Minnesota, and raised in the San Francisco Bay Area. His Bachelor of Arts, in political science and Third World development, was awarded by Williams College in 1982.

He worked reporting on education at the Tri-City Herald of Kennewick, Washington, for a year.

In 1983 he became an employee of The New York Times, and has been there ever since. For his first year, his position was the clerk of James Reston, the senior columnist. He covered a variety of areas from 1984 to 1990, including an investigation of HUD affairs in Puerto Rico in the spring of 1990.

In 1990 he took the title of Pentagon Correspondent, which led him to cover stories such as the Gulf War in early 1991, Somalia in December 1992, and Haiti in September 1994.

In 1996 he became a domestic correspondent covering the United States Congress and immigration.

Upon the September 11 attacks in 2001, he returned to covering the Pentagon, focusing on U.S. national security. As of 2010 his assignment is the war on terrorism.

== Major reporting ==
Schmitt is notable for breaking the story that the Obama administration was planning to reverse the Bush policy of holding captives in extrajudicial detention in American internment facilities in Afghanistan, without allowing them to learn why they were being held. On September 12, 2009, Schmitt, quoting officials who did not want to go on the record by name, that Bagram captives would be allowed to request to review and challenge the allegations that lead to their detention.

In 2004 Schmitt reported on women in the military who had reported being raped by their fellow GIs in Iraq. Schmitt was interviewed by National Public Radio about the story.

Schmitt was one of the New York Times journalists who played a key role in reporting the homicide of several Afghan captives in U.S. custody at the Bagram Air Base internment facility in 2003 and 2004.

In 2006 Schmitt and a colleague reported on bribery concerns that involved Major Gloria Davis, an officer in the United States Army who was found dead from a gunshot wound shortly thereafter.

In 2011, he published a book, Counterstrike: The Untold Story of America's Secret Campaign Against Al Qaeda with Thom Shanker, his colleague at the New York Times. His book provides a more in-depth view of the war on terror and what U.S. intelligence agencies know about al-Qaeda's inner workings in a narrative journalism format.
