= Samoud Khan =

Samoud Khan (also known as Sammoud Khan, or Commander Sammoud) is an Afghan former militia commander from Logar Province. He is said to have been a pro-American commander.

== Mousauwal Compound ==
Samoud's Mousauwal Compound is notorious for its many young men having been detained, sexually abused and forced to work:

- Asadullah Rahman, the youngest Guantanamo detainee, recounted being apprehended in Samoud's compound when it was raided by American troops. Asadullah Rahman described being sold into servitude to Samoud, when he was about ten years old. By day he worked in Samoud's kitchen. Asadullah said that, by night, he was forced to perform sexual services for Samoud's men.
- Naqib Ullah was 14 when he was kidnapped, raped and enslaved in Samoud's compound.
- During his Combatant Status Review Tribunal a young Guantanamo detainee named Habib Rahman, who acknowledged working as a cook for Samoud, told his Tribunal that they could ask Samoud their questions himself, as he was still a prisoner in Bagram.
- Another Guantanamo detainee, Mohabet Khan, said he was forcibly conscripted into Samoud's forces shortly before Samoud's compound was captured by the Americans.
- A third Guantanamo detainee, Shardar Khan acknowledged working as a bodyguard for Samoud. He testified that Samoud's local enemy was another militia leader named Abdul Ali, who had murdered Samoud's son.

The San Francisco Chronicle quoted Mohammed Sabir, a local police official who confirmed that "Commander Samoud" was not associated with the Taliban, that he was a simple criminal who terrorized the nearby villages, and whose gang numbered about thirty men.

In 2003, an Afghan, Mohammed Khan, was detained in Guantanamo because of his knowledge of Samoud Khan's whereabouts.

== Bibliography ==
- Gopal, Anand (2014). No Good Men Among the Living: America, the Taliban, and the War through Afghan Eyes. Henry Holt and Company. ISBN 9781429945028.
