= Sardar Muhammad =

Sardar Muhammad or Muhammad Sardar may refer to:

- Sardar Muhammad Chaudhry (1937–2001), Pakistani police officer
- Sardar Muhammad (wrestler) (born 1944), Pakistani wrestler
- Mohammad Sardar (born 1999), Afghan cricketer
