= Hafizullah Shabaz Khail =

- Born: 1946 (age 79–80); Paktia, Afghanistan
- Detained at: Guantanamo, BTIF
- ISN: 1001

Dr. Hafizullah Shabaz Khail is a citizen of Afghanistan, who was held in extrajudicial detention in the United States's Guantanamo Bay detention camps, in Cuba. American intelligence analysts estimate he was born in 1946, in Paktia, Afghanistan.

According to the Center for Constitutional Rights, Hafizullah Shabaz Khail is an Afghan pharmacist who served in the transitional Afghan government after the Taliban's fall and that he was the victim of false arrest while serving on a commission of elders attempting to uncover theft perpetrated by government officials.

Hafizullah Shabaz Khail was repatriated to Afghanistan on December 12, 2007.

He was captured, again, in his home, in September 2008.

== Repatriation ==
On November 25, 2008, the Department of Defense published a list of when Guantanamo captives were repatriated. According to that list he was repatriated on December 12, 2007.

The Center for Constitutional Rights reports that all of the Afghans repatriated to Afghanistan from April 2007 were sent to Afghan custody in the American built and supervised wing of the Pul-e-Charkhi prison near Kabul.

== Second capture ==
The Associated Press reported on February 7, 2009, that "Hafizullah Shahbaz Khiel" was captured a second time in September 2008, less than a year after his December 2007 release from Guantanamo. According to the Associated Press, he was being detained in the Bagram Theater internment facility. The Americans have been given affidavits, attesting to his innocence, from the elders on the village council, his Province's Governor, the National Reconciliation Committee, and two members of the National Legislature, but he remained in detention.

Peter M. Ryan, the American lawyer who had handled his habeas petition, told the Associated Press that he suspected his second capture was due to American military intelligence officials failing to update their records that he had been cleared of suspicion in the allegations that had triggered his original erroneous capture.
