= Gul Mohammed (habeas petitioner) =

Gul Mohammed is a citizen of Afghanistan held in extrajudicial detention in United States custody in it Bagram Theater detention facility, in Bagram, Afghanistan.

Gul Mohammed is one of the detainees named on Ghulam Mohammed v. Don Rumsfeld.
