= Mohammed Gul (Taliban leader) =

Taliban leader

Mohammed Gul is a citizen of Pakistan, who is alleged to be a Taliban leader. When Nek Mohammed Wazir was killed by a missile strike from a Predator drone in June 2004, Pakistan's Dawn said he had initially been recruited into the Taliban by a Mohammed Gul, a "former Afghan Mujahid". According to Dawn he is a "Kharoti tribesman from southern Afghanistan", who lived in a refugee camp near Wana.

In 2006 the New York Sun said Pakistani authorities in Waziristan had released Mohammad Gul as part of a good will gesture. They described him as "a relative of Faqir Mohammed", and a "militant leader sought by security agencies for allegedly aiding remnants of the Taliban and Al Qaeda'".
