= Ramzi Kassem =

American lawyer (born 1978)

Ramzi Kassem (born 1978) is an American lawyer who currently serves as chief counsel to New York City Mayor Zohran Mamdani. He is also a law professor at CUNY School of Law.

Kassem argued in the U.S. Supreme Court on behalf of the respondents in Tanzin v. Tanvir (2020), winning an unanimous decision in favor of his client.
