= 519th Military Intelligence Battalion (United States) =

- 519th Military Intelligence Battalion coat of arms
- Active: 1948-present
- Country: United States
- Branch: U.S. Army
- Part of: 525th Expeditionary Military Intelligence Brigade
- Garrison/HQ: Fort Bragg, NC
- Engagements: Korean War; Vietnam War; Invasion of Grenada; Invasion of Panama; Desert Storm; Invasion of Afghanistan; Invasion of Iraq

Insignia
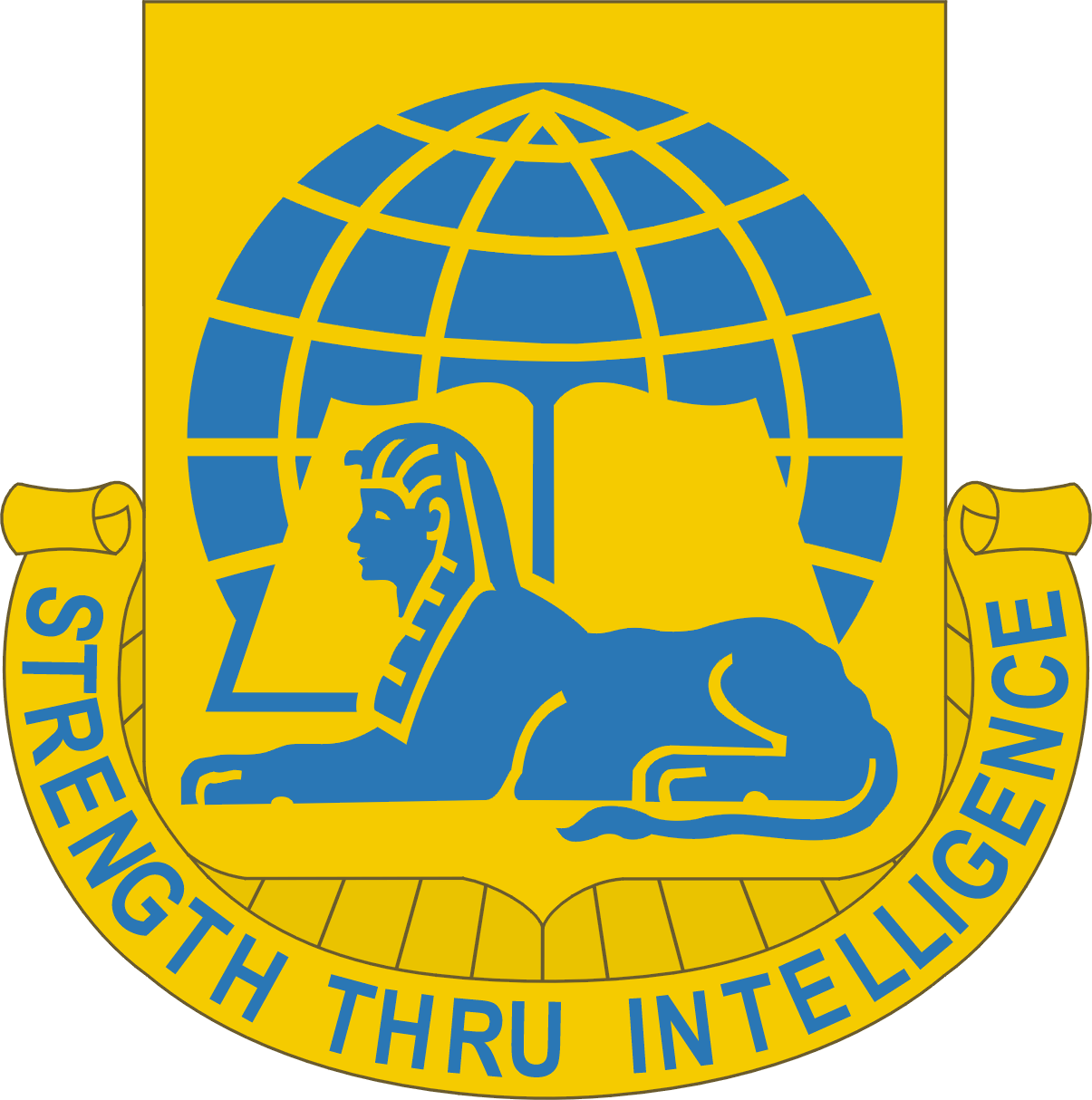
- Distinctive Unit Insignia

The 519th Military Intelligence Battalion is a unit of the United States Army.

The battalion was first created in 1948. The battalion served in the Vietnam War; the Invasion of Grenada; the Invasion of Panama; Desert Storm; the Invasion of Afghanistan; and the Invasion of Iraq. Additionally, Company A served in the Korean War prior to the formation of the battalion as the 523d Military Intelligence Company.

== History ==
The 519th Military Intelligence Battalion was activated on 15 October 1948 at Fort Riley, Kansas. Elements of the battalion served in the Republic of Korea from 1951 until 1954, participating in seven campaigns and earning one Meritorious Unit Commendation and two Republic of Korea Presidential Unit Citations. The battalion was inactivated in 1954. On 25 January 1958, the 519th Military Intelligence (MI) Battalion (BN) (Airborne (ABN)) was reactivated at Fort Bragg, North Carolina. In May 1965, the 519th MI BN (ABN) deployed to the Dominican Republic for Operation Powerpack, where it supported the 82nd Airborne Division and the U.S. Marines in combating the Communist insurgency on the Caribbean island. In late summer of 1965 the 519th MI BN redeployed back to FT Bragg, NC and deployed to the Republic of Vietnam in November 1965. During the Vietnam War, the battalion again left the United States and distinguished itself by participating in sixteen campaigns and earning three Meritorious Unit Commendations.

In 1972, the battalion returned to Fort Bragg. After several reorganizations, the battalion officially achieved a three-company configuration in September 1978, with Headquarters, Headquarters & Service Company; Company A (Interrogation); and Company B (Counterintelligence). In April 1981, the Forces Command Intelligence Training Detachment (FITD) was attached to the battalion, bringing with it the mission of training Army Reserve and National Guard units throughout the United States. On 16 April 1982, the battalion was reorganized and redesignated the 519th Military Intelligence Battalion (Tactical Exploitation) (Airborne), resulting in the activation of Company C (Electronic Warfare). Since then the battalion has reorganized one more time. In 1995, Company C was deactivated and Company F, 51st Infantry (Long Range Surveillance) was assigned to the battalion to provide the Corps with long range surveillance capability. About 2007, during the reconfiguration of the 525th MI Brigade to a Battlefield Surveillance Brigade (BFSB), Company F, 51st Infantry was redesignated C Troop (ABN), 1st Squadron, 38th Cavalry Regiment (1-38th CAV) and was removed from the control of the 519th MI BN and reassigned to 1-38th CAV, which is another subordinate battalion in the 525th BFSB. Subsequently, C Co. 519th MI BN was reactivated as a line company in the 519th MI BN.

The battalion participated in combat operations in Grenada (Operation Urgent Fury) in November 1983, Panama (Operation Just Cause) in December 1989, and in the Kuwaiti Theater of Operations (KTO) (Operation Desert Shield and Operation Desert Storm) and was subordinate to the 525th MI Brigade (CEWI) (ABN), as part of the XVIII Airborne Corps, under Third US Army during the deployment in the KTO from August 1990 to March 1991.

During the 1990s, the 519th MI BN participated in Peace Keeping Operations in Haiti (Operation Restore Democracy), Bosnia (Operations Joint Endeavor and Joint Forge) and Kosovo (Operation Joint Guardian). The 519th MI BN also deployed individual Tactical Human Intelligence Teams to Somalia in support of Operation Restore Hope.

The 519th Military Intelligence Battalion is a subordinate unit of the 525th Expeditionary Military Intelligence Brigade, provides tactical HUMINT, long range reconnaissance and surveillance, counterintelligence, interrogation, multi-functional collection and exploitation, and SIGINT support within assigned areas of the Division, Corps, Joint Task Force (JTF) or Multi-National Force area of operations.

During the global war on terrorism, 519th MI BN has repeatedly deployed for combat operations in both Afghanistan and Iraq. The 519th MI BN served in Operation Enduring Freedom (OEF) I, OEF III, OEF IV, Operation Iraqi Freedom (OIF) I, OIF IV, and OEF XII and has continued to distinguish itself as one of the elite intelligence battalions in the military. "Always Out Front"!

The battalion redeployed back to FT Bragg, NC after serving in Afghanistan in support of Operation Enduring Freedom XI, from July 2010 to July 2011, under the command of LTC Anthony "Tony" Hale as part of Combined Joint Task Force (CJTF) 101. While in Afghanistan, the 519th MI Battalion was headquartered out of Bagram Air Base, Afghanistan, with its units deployed throughout Regional Command East. The 519th MI BN is commanded by LTC Kevin McAninch, who assumed command on 4 August 2011 from LTC (P) Tony Hale.

== Unit organization ==
The battalion has undergone various reorganizations. In addition to a headquarters company it has contained:

- Company A -- interrogation;
- Company B -- counter-intelligence;
- Company C -- electronic warfare (deactivated); (in Vietnam this was Field Operations Intelligence/Collection not EW)
- Training company—the Forces Command Intelligence Training Detachment—trains reservists;
- Company F -- 51 Infantry Long Range Surveillance Company
- 45th Military Intelligence Company -- order of battle analysis and imagery interpretation (in Vietnam provided intelligence analysts to the Combined Intelligence Center, Vietnam (CICV) and the Combined Material Exploitation Center (CMEC), deactivated March 1973)

== Recent controversies ==
=== Bagram torture and prisoner abuse ===
A platoon of Company A of the 519th, under the command of then Lieutenant Carolyn Wood was implicated in the use of unauthorized interrogation techniques, physical abuse, sexual abuse and the deaths in custody of captives during the fall of 2002.

=== Abu Ghraib torture and prisoner abuse ===
Wood was promoted to captain and placed in command of Company A in 2003 prior to the assignment of the company to lead the interrogations at Abu Ghraib. According to the Fay Report Wood played a key role in the importation of extended interrogation techniques the Bush administration had claimed could be used against illegal combatants in Afghanistan to Iraq where prisoners were still entitled to the protections of the Geneva Conventions. Personnel in Company A were implicated in the sexual abuse of captives, and were alleged to have provided guidance to military police to abuse prisoners to soften them up for interrogation.

== Decorations ==
Vietnam

- Meritorious Unit Commendation, inscription: VIETNAM 1968-1969
- Meritorious Unit Commendation, inscription: VIETNAM 1970
- Meritorious Unit Commendation, inscription: VIETNAM 1971-1972

Operation Iraqi Freedom

- Meritorious Unit Commendation 2007

== See also ==
- Prisoner abuse
