= Black jail =

US military detention camp in Afghanistan

Coordinates: 34.944°N 69.265°E

The Black Jail was a U.S. military detention camp established in 2002 inside Bagram Air Base, Afghanistan. Since the withdrawal of U.S. troops from Afghanistan, it is no longer in operation. Distinct from the main prison of the Bagram Internment Facility, the Black Jail was run by the U.S. Defense Intelligence Agency and U.S. Special Operations Forces. There were numerous allegations of abuse associated with the prison, including beatings, sleep deprivation and forcing inmates into stress positions. U.S. authorities have refused to acknowledge the prison's existence. The facility consisted of individual windowless concrete cells, each illuminated by a single light bulb glowing 24 hours a day. Its existence was first reported by journalist Anand Gopal and confirmed by many subsequent investigations.

Although U.S. President Barack Obama signed an order to eliminate black sites run by the Central Intelligence Agency in January 2009, that order did not apply to the Black Jail. However, in August, the Obama administration restricted the time that detainees could be held at the secret jail, and another like it at Balad Air Base in Iraq, to two weeks. During the facility's existence, human rights organisations were concerned that the jail remained inaccessible to both the Red Cross and the Afghan Independent Human Rights Commission. The ICRC claimed that it had been receiving names of inmates since 2009.

BBC News reported on May 11, 2010, that the Red Cross had confirmed the site's existence to them and that they had heard the accounts of former inmates.

== See also ==
- List of prisons in Afghanistan
