= Andy Worthington =

British historian

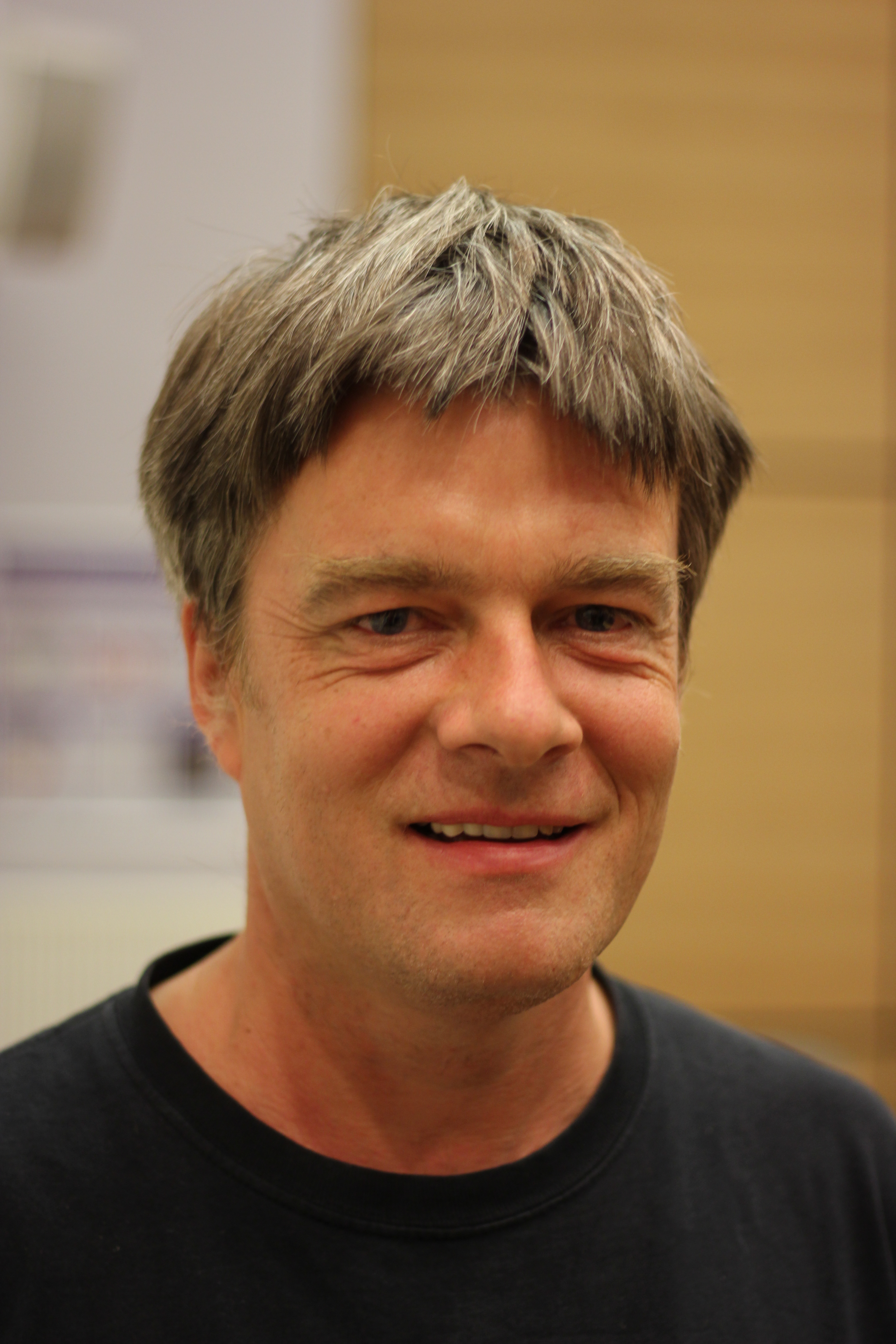
- Worthington in 2012
- Occupations: Journalist, historian, film director
- Writing career
- Subjects: British social history, Stonehenge the war on terror
- Website: andyworthington.co.uk

Andy Worthington is a British historian, investigative journalist, and film director. He has published three books, two on Stonehenge and one on the war on terror, been published in numerous publications and directed documentary films. Articles by Worthington have been published in The New York Times, The Guardian, The Huffington Post, AlterNet, ZNet, the Future of Freedom Foundation and Amnesty International, and Qatar-based Al Jazeera. He has appeared on television with Iran-based Press TV In 2008, he began writing articles for Cageprisoners, and became its Senior Researcher in June 2010.

== Writing and reporting ==
His first two books were: Stonehenge: Celebration & Subversion and The Battle of the Beanfield. The first book concerns modern celebrations at the ancient astronomical site, and the differing interpretations of modern celebrants. The second book concerns a large confrontation between police and new age celebrants travelling to Stonehenge on 1 June 1985.

Worthington's third book is The Guantanamo Files: The Stories of the 774 Detainees in America's Illegal Prison. Following its publication in October 2007, Worthington has published articles supplementing the information in his book, to track new developments. Michelle Shephard, author of Guantanamo's Child, when summing up other books on Guantánamo, described his book as: "Perhaps the single most important book to cover the big picture of Guantánamo", even though he "has never even been to Guantánamo Bay." Stephen Grey, writing in the New Statesman, called the book "...a powerful, essential and long-overdue piece of research".

In 2008, he wrote the entry "Guantanamo Scandal" for Microsoft Encarta.

In 2009, Worthington and Polly Nash co-directed Outside the Law: Stories from Guantanamo, a 75-minute documentary about the Guantánamo detainees. The film focuses on the cases of United Kingdom citizen Moazzam Begg, and Omar Deghayes and Shaker Aamer, legal residents of the UK. In addition to interviews with Begg and Deghayes, there are interviews with lawyers Clive Stafford Smith and Tom Wilner, and Worthington himself.

In 2009, Worthington published what has been described as the most definitive annotated list of all Guantánamo detainees. In January 2010, he published the first annotated list of Bagram detainees.

Worthington has made many radio and television appearances as a commentator on Guantánamo since the publication of his third book.

On 16 June 2009, Worthington revealed new information on the death of Ibn al-Shaykh al-Libi a former US ghost prisoner who died in a Libyan jail. He described in particular the prisons in which al Libi was held, and the ways in which torture was used by his interrogators. Worthington reported that former Guantánamo detainee, United Kingdom resident, and citizen of Libya Omar Deghayes was his link to a source within Libya who had spoken with Al Libi prior to his death.

In 2010, Amnesty International was criticised for its partnership with Cageprisoners' Moazzam Begg by Gita Sahgal, its former Gender Unit head. Worthington defended Amnesty International and Begg, citing Islamophobia. He said, "I know from personal experience that Moazzam Begg is no extremist. We have met on numerous occasions, have had several long discussions, and have shared platforms together at many events."

== See also ==
- Sayed Gulab
