= International Justice Network =

The International Justice Network (IJNetwork) is a non-profit organization dedicated to protection of human rights and the rule of law throughout the world. They provide direct legal assistance to victims of human rights abuses through a global network of legal professionals, non-governmental organizations and other human rights advocates.

IJNetwork was the only organization representing detainees at the Bagram Theater Internment Facility located in the U.S. Bagram Airbase in Afghanistan.

The IJNetwork has numerous other projects, including assisting the Namibia magistrate and tribal court systems to establish a uniform open source software database of decisions issued by those courts.

== See also ==
- International Commission of Jurists
