= Guantanamo Bay files leak =

2011 disclosure of U.S. government documents

The Guantanamo Bay files leak (also known as The Guantanamo Files, or colloquially, Gitmo Files) began on 24 April 2011, when WikiLeaks, along with The New York Times, NPR and The Guardian and other independent news organizations, began publishing 765 formerly secret documents relating to detainees at the United States' Guantanamo Bay detention camp established in 2002 after its invasion of Afghanistan in 2001. The documents consist of classified assessments, interviews, and internal memos about detainees, which were written by the Pentagon's Joint Task Force Guantanamo, headquartered at Guantanamo Bay Naval Base. The documents are marked "secret" and NOFORN (information that is not to be shared with representatives of other countries).

Media reports on the documents note that more than 150 innocent Afghans and Pakistanis, including farmers, chefs, and drivers, were held for years without charges. The documents also reveal that some of the prison's youngest and oldest detainees, who include Mohammed Sadiq, an 89-year-old man, and Naqib Ullah, a 14-year-old boy, suffered from fragile mental and physical conditions. The files contain statements from Khalid Sheikh Mohammed, the planner of the 9/11 attacks, who said that al-Qaeda possessed nuclear capacity and would use it to retaliate for any attack on Osama bin Laden.

== Leak ==
The New York Times said it received the documents from an anonymous source other than WikiLeaks, and it shared them with other news outlets such as NPR and The Guardian. The Guardian reported that the Guantanamo Bay files were "among hundreds of thousands of documents" that U.S. soldier Chelsea Manning was accused of having turned over to WikiLeaks in 2010.

The United States Department of Justice (DOJ) said the documents remained legally classified despite the leaks. It informed the lawyers who represent the prisoners in Guantanamo that they were not allowed to read the documents, which have been published by The New York Times and other major media outlets.

The U.S. government issued a statement: "It is unfortunate that The New York Times and other news organizations have made the decision to publish numerous documents obtained illegally by WikiLeaks concerning the Guantanamo detention facility." The documents seem to be "Detainee Assessment Briefs" (DABs) written between 2002 and 2009 and "may or may not represent the current view of a given detainee."

== Notable elements ==
The Guardian noted that, despite the government's claim of having detained dangerous militants, the files, which covered almost all the prisoners held since 2002, revealed an emphasis on holding people to extract intelligence. Although many prisoners were assessed as not posing a threat to security, they were nonetheless detained for lengths of time.

The files showed that nearly 100 detainees had been diagnosed with depressive or psychotic illnesses. The United States tried to retain British nationals and legal residents, such as Jamal al-Harith and Binyam Mohamed, for intelligence value, although its agents knew neither were members of the Taliban or al-Qaeda, and Mohamed had been tortured, so any "evidence" he provided was suspect due to that fact.

The Guardian noted that the files revealed that the U.S. relied strongly on evidence obtained from a relatively few number of detainees, most of whom had been tortured. One detainee made allegations against more than 100 other detainees, so many that his accusations should have been considered suspect. The U.S. issued guidance to its interrogators that was based on assumptions of threat based on flimsy associations – through attendance at particular mosques, stays at certain guest houses in Pakistan and Afghanistan, and other elements.

The Guantanamo Files revealed that Sami al-Hajj, an Al Jazeera journalist and cameraman, was detained from 2002 to 2008, allegedly in part so that U.S. officials could interrogate him about the news network. According to the file, he was detained "to provide information on ... the al-Jazeera news network's training programme, telecommunications equipment, and newsgathering operations in Chechnya, Kosovo and Afghanistan, including the network's acquisition of a video of UBL [Osama bin Laden] and a subsequent interview with UBL." He was considered to be "a HIGH risk, as he is likely to pose a threat to the US, its interests, and allies" and "of HIGH intelligence value."

Sami al-Haji has said that he was beaten and sexually assaulted in detention. His lawyer Clive Stafford Smith, also legal director of the British organisation Reprieve, said that the U.S. had tried to force al-Haji to become an informant against his employers.

=== Torture of Khalid Sheikh Mohammed ===
Other documents revealed that Khalid Sheikh Mohammed, the planner of the 9/11 attacks, had been waterboarded at least 183 times by the CIA, which held him in custody until September 2006, when he was transferred to Guantanamo. One of the statements Khalid made under duress was that if Osama bin Laden were captured or killed by U.S. allies, an Al-Qaeda sleeper cell would detonate a "weapon of mass destruction" in a "secret location" in Europe. He said it would be "a nuclear hellstorm". No such attack has occurred following the killing of bin Laden in May 2011. Al-Qaeda vowed to retaliate.

== Reactions ==
The contrast between foreign and United States media was noted by several journalists, including Glenn Greenwald who described the differences as "stark, predictable and revealing". He wrote that "foreign newspapers highlight how these documents show U.S. actions to be so oppressive and unjust, while American newspapers downplayed that fact."

== See also ==
- Black jail
- Black site
- Salt Pit § The Dark Prison
- Extrajudicial prisoners of the United States
