= Parwan Detention Facility =

Afghanistan's main military prison

Coordinates: 34°56′33″N 69°17′51″E

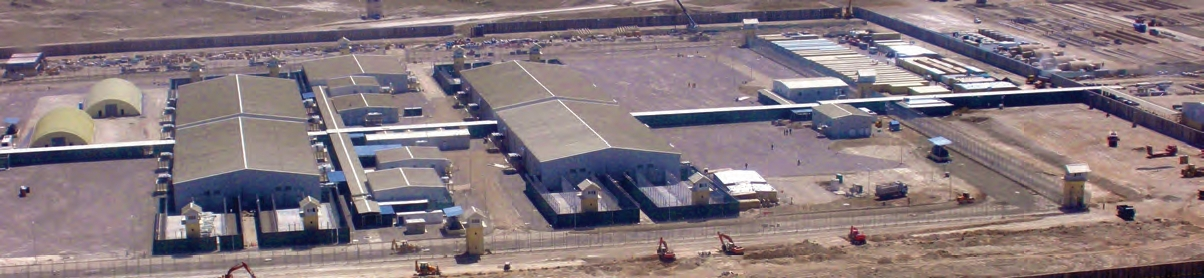
Aerial view of the Parwan Detention Facility during its completion in 2009.

The Parwan Detention Facility (also called Detention Facility in Parwan or Bagram prison) is Afghanistan's main military prison. Situated next to the Bagram Air Base in the Parwan Province of Afghanistan, the prison was built by the U.S. during the George W. Bush administration. The Parwan Detention Facility, which housed foreign and local combatants, was maintained by the Afghan National Army.

Once known as the Bagram Collection Point, initially it was intended to be a temporary facility. Nevertheless, it was used longer and handled more detainees than the U.S. Guantanamo Bay detention camp in Cuba. As of June 2011, the Parwan detention facility held 1,700 prisoners; there had been 600 prisoners under the Bush administration. None of the prisoners received prisoner of war status.

Treatment of inmates at the facility came under scrutiny after two Afghan detainees died in the 2002 Bagram torture and prisoner abuse case. Their deaths were classified as homicides, and prisoner abuse charges were made against seven American soldiers. Concerns about lengthy detentions there prompted comparisons to U.S. detention centers in Guantanamo Bay in Cuba and Abu Ghraib in Iraq. Part of the internment facility was known as the black jail.

== Physical site ==
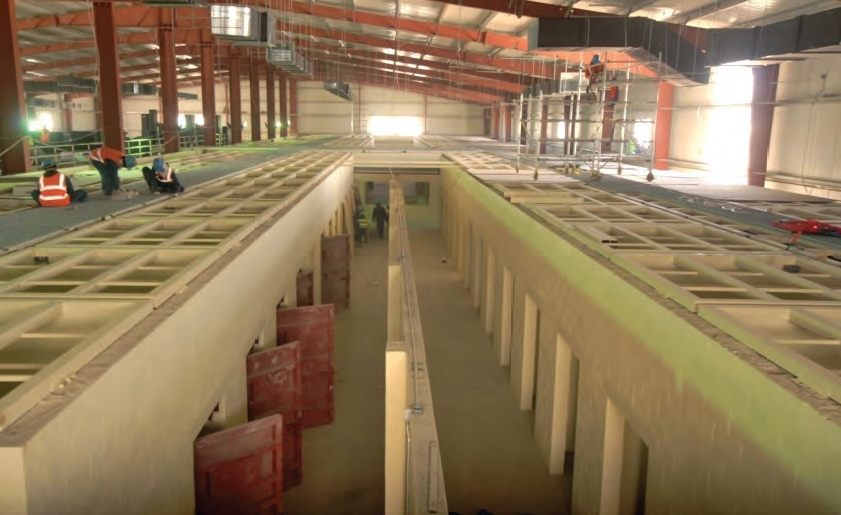
Construction of the new detention facility

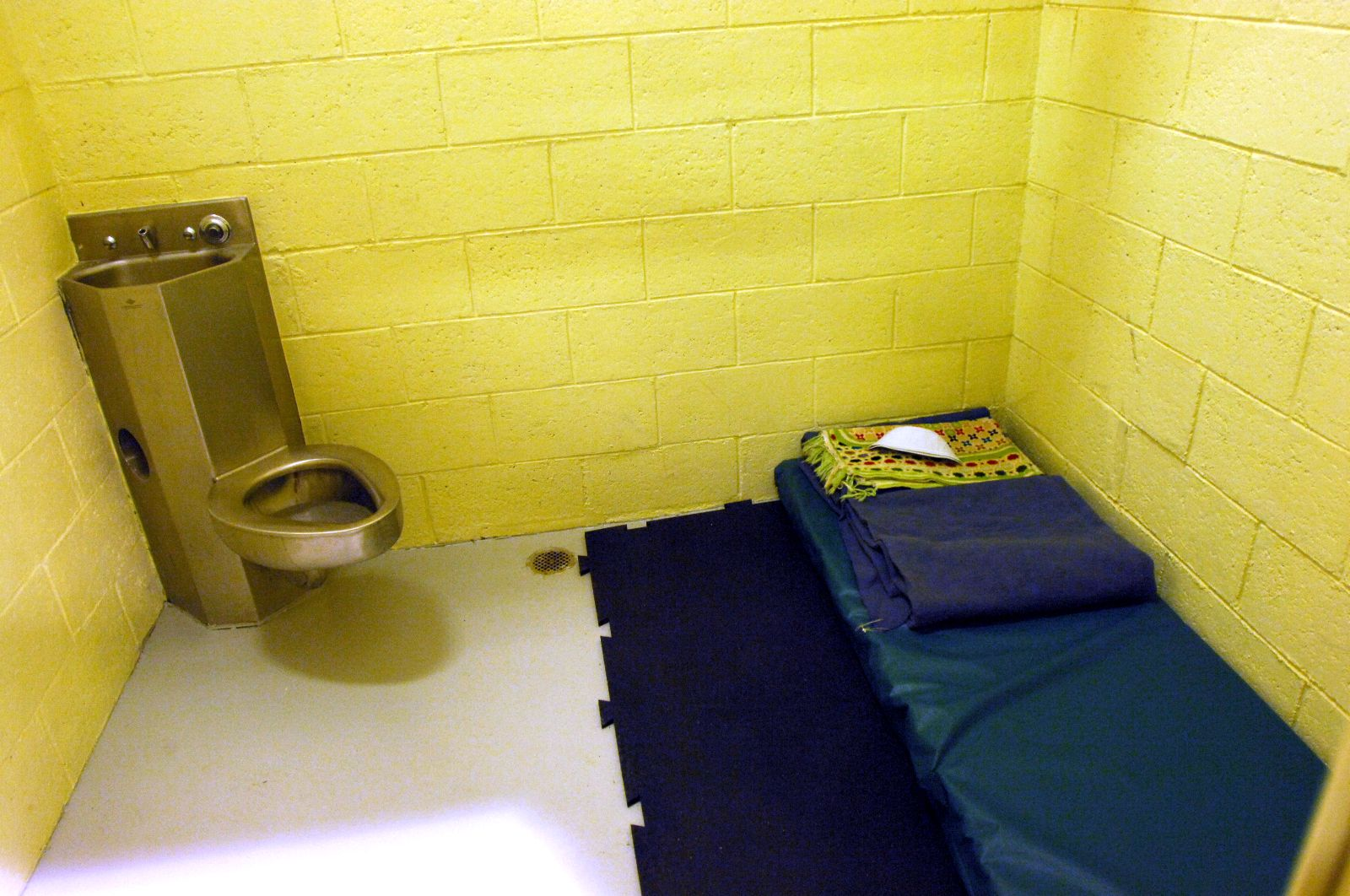
Inside view of a cell after completion in 2009

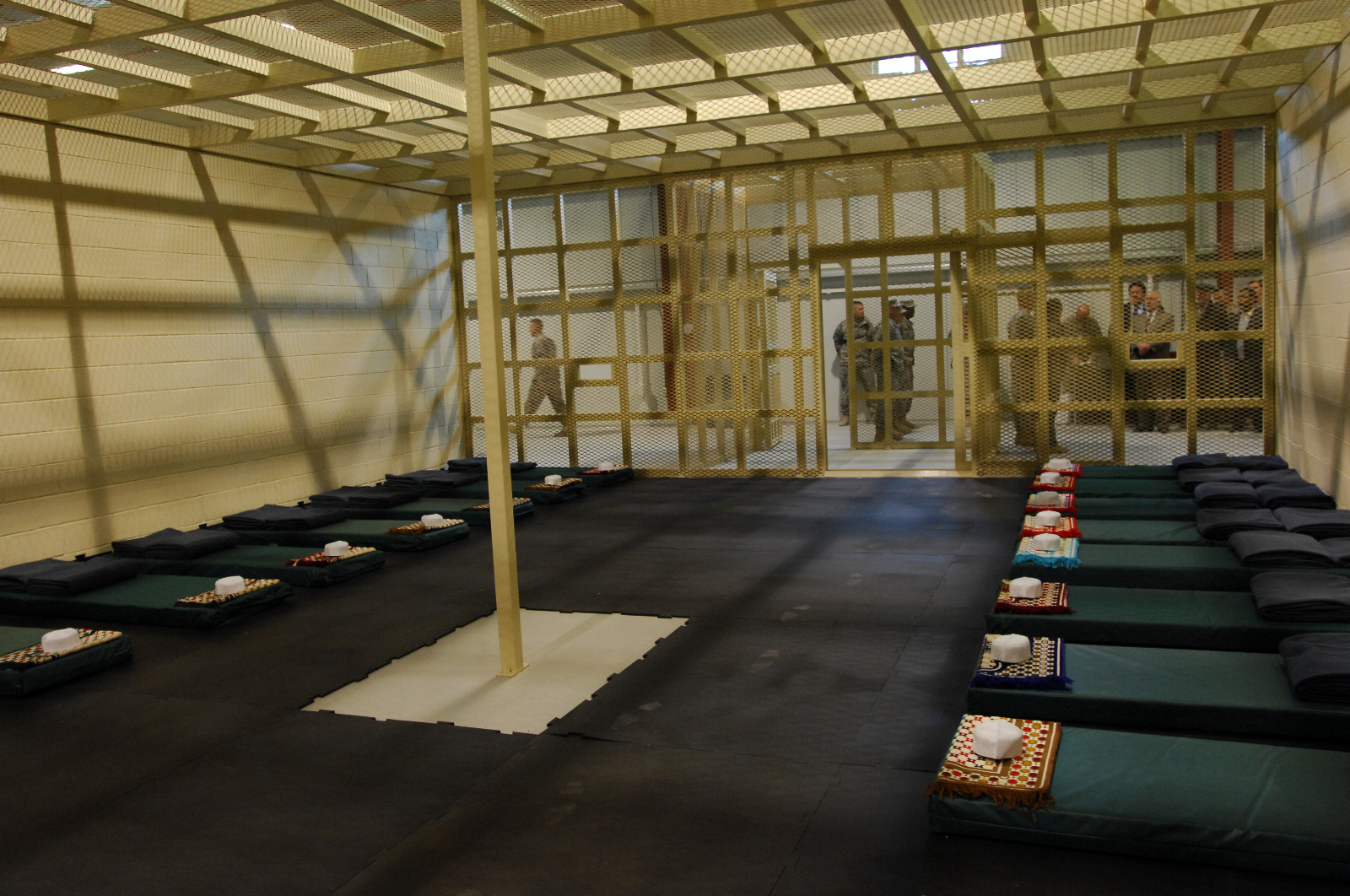
Inside the multi-bed room

Bagram Air Base was established by the U.S. in the 1950s. It was used by the Soviet Red Army during the 1980s Soviet–Afghan War. The airfield included large hangars that fell into disrepair amidst the 1990s civil war. After removal of the Taliban and formation of the Karzai administration, the U.S. took control of the base. It did not need the volume of hangar space, so it built a detention facility inside the large unused hangars. As with the first facilities later built at Guantanamo's Camp X-Ray, the cells were built of wire mesh. Only captives held in solitary confinement had individual cells. Other captives shared larger open cells.

Some accounts reported that captives were provided with shared buckets to use as toilets and lacked access to running water. Although captives shared their cells with dozens of other captives, there were reports in 2006 that they were forbidden to speak with or to look at one another.

During an interview on Now on PBS, Chris Hogan, a former interrogator at Bagram, described the prisoners' cells as they were in early 2002:

I can't speak to what the conditions may be like now. But in my tenure, the prison population lived in an abandoned Soviet warehouse. The warehouse had a cement floor and it was a huge square-footage area. On the floor of that, what must have been some sort of an airplane hangar, six prison cages were erected, which were divided by concertina wire ... Those prison cages had a wooden floor, a platform built above the cement floor of the hangar. Each prisoner had a bunch of blankets, a small mat, and in the back of each one of those cages was a makeshift toilet, the same type of toilet that the soldiers used, which was a 50-gallon drum, halved with diesel fuel put in the bottom of it and a wooden kind of seat to that platform ... It's very similar, incidentally, to the conditions that the soldiers lived in; almost identical.

According to an article by Tim Golden, published in the 7 January 2008 issue of The New York Times, captives in the Bagram facility continued to be housed in large communal pens.

The original temporary facilities of 2001 were replaced by permanent facilities completed in September 2009. According to Reuters, transfer of the 700 captives at the time to the new facilities was to begin in late November 2009, for completion by the calendar year end. Brigadier General Mark Martins, Bagram's commandant, told reporters that the facility had always met international and domestic standards.

Although the new facility was near the previous facility, DoD sources occasionally referred to it as the Parwan facility, rather than Bagram.

On December 11, 2014, U.S. Armed Forces transferred the facility to the Afghan government.

== Torture and prisoner abuse ==
At least two deaths were verified in the last decade: captives were known to have been beaten to death by GIs staffing the facility in December 2002.

Captives confined to both Bagram and the Guantanamo Bay detention camp recounted that, while in Bagram, they were warned that if they did not cooperate more fully, they would be sent to a worse site in Cuba. Captives compared the two camps said that conditions were far worse in Bagram.

In May 2010, nine Afghan former detainees reported to the International Committee of the Red Cross (ICRC) that they had been held in a separate facility (known as the black jail) where they had been subject to isolation in cold cells, sleep deprivation, and other forms of torture. The U.S. military denied the existence of a separate facility for detainees.

In early 2012, Afghan president Hamid Karzai ordered that control of the Parwan Detention Facility be handed over to Afghan authorities after some inmates complained of being strip-searched and put in solitary confinement.

== High profile escapes ==
When the GIs implicated in the December 2002 homicides were about to face court martial, four prisoners escaped from Bagram. At least one of these was a prosecution witness, and was thus unable to testify.

== Legal status of detainees ==
The George W. Bush administration avoided the label "prisoner of war" when discussing the prisoners held at Bagram, preferring to immediately classify them as "unlawful enemy combatants". This way, the administration argued, it was not necessary under the Geneva Conventions to have a competent tribunal determine their classification. (In previous conflicts such as the Vietnam War, Army Regulation 190-8 Tribunals determined the status of prisoners of war.)

The administration also argued initially that the detainees could not access the U.S. legal system. However, the United States Supreme Court's ruling in Rasul v. Bush confirmed that captives in U.S. jurisdiction did indeed have the right to access U.S. courts. Rasul v. Bush determined that the Executive Branch lacked the authority, under the United States Constitution, to suspend the right for detainees to submit writs of habeas corpus.

The Supreme Court's ruling in Rasul v. Bush also resulted in establishing Combatant Status Review Tribunals to review and confirm the information that initially led each captive to be classified as an enemy combatant. The Department of Defense (DoD) convened these tribunals for every captive in Guantanamo Bay, but did not apply the rule to Bagram. The most recently reported legal process governing the status of Bagram captives was the Enemy Combatant Review Board, described by Eliza Griswold in The New Republic:

Prisoners don't even have the limited access to lawyers available to prisoners in Guantánamo. Nor do they have the right to Combatant Status Review Tribunals, which Guantánamo detainees won in the 2004 Supreme Court ruling in Hamdi v. Rumsfeld. Instead, if a combat commander chooses, he can convene an Enemy Combatant Review Board (ECRB), at which the detainee has no right to a personal advocate, no chance to speak in his own defense, and no opportunity to review the evidence against him. The detainee isn't even allowed to attend. And, thanks to such limited access to justice, many former detainees say they have no idea why they were either detained or released.

On February 20, 2009, the Department of Justice under President Barack Obama announced it would continue the policy that detainees in Afghanistan could not challenge their detention in U.S. courts.

On April 2, 2009, U.S. District Judge John D. Bates ruled that those Bagram captives who had been transferred from outside Afghanistan could use habeas corpus. Ramzi Kassem, the lawyer for one of the men, stated:

Today, a U.S. federal judge ruled that our government cannot simply kidnap people and hold them beyond the law.

The Obama administration appealed the ruling. A former Guantanamo Bay defense attorney, Neal Katyal, led the government's case. The decision was reversed on May 21, 2010, the appeals court unanimously ruling that Bagram detainees lacked the right to habeas corpus hearings.

There is a reason we have never allowed enemy prisoners detained overseas in an active war zone to sue in federal court for their release. It simply makes no sense and would be the ultimate act of turning the war into a crime.

— Senator Lindsey Graham

== Captives access to video link ==
On January 15, 2008, the ICRC and the U.S. military set up a pilot project to let certain well-behaved prisoners not in solitary confinement in Bagram to communicate with visitors over a video link. The ICRC was to provide captives' families with a subsidy to cover their travel expenses to the video-link's studio at the ICRC office in Kabul, from where video-calls to the US military facility in Bagram could be made via a "dedicated wireless-link setup".

== General Douglas Stone's report on the Bagram captives ==
In August 2009, a general in the United States Marine Corps Reserve filed a 700-page report on the Bagram internment facility and its captives. According to senior officials who had been briefed by Major General Douglas Stone, he reported,

up to 400 of the 600 prisoners at the U.S.-run prison at the Bagram Air Base in Afghanistan have done nothing wrong and should be released.

According to Daphne Eviatar, writing in the Washington Independent, Stone recommended that the U.S. should try to rehabilitate any genuine enemies it holds, rather than simply imprison them.

== General Stanley McChrystal's assessment ==
According to Chris Sands, writing in The National, General Stanley McChrystal wrote in a leaked report:

Committed Islamists are indiscriminately mixed with petty criminals and sex offenders, and they are using the opportunity to radicalise and indoctrinate them ... hundreds are held without charge or without a defined way ahead.

According to The Guardian, McChrystal wrote:

There are more insurgents per square foot in corrections facilities than anywhere else in Afghanistan. Unchecked, Taliban/al-Qaida leaders patiently co-ordinate and plan, unconcerned with interference from prison personnel or the military.

== Detainees ==
According to Tim Golden of The New York Times, in 2008, the number of people held in Bagram had doubled since 2004, while the number of people held in Guantanamo had been halved.

A graphic published to accompany Golden's article showed approximately 300 captives in Bagram, and approximately 600 in Guantanamo, in May 2004, and showed the reverse in December 2007.

On August 23, 2009, the United States Department of Defense reversed its policy on revealing the names of its captives in Afghanistan and Iraq, including at the Bagram Theater Internment Facility and announced that their names would be released to the ICRC. In January 2010, the names of 645 detainees were released. This list was prompted by a Freedom of Information Act lawsuit filed in September 2009 by the American Civil Liberties Union, whose lawyers had also demanded detailed information about conditions, rules and regulations.

The number of people imprisoned sharply increased under the Obama administration, reaching 1,700 in June 2011.

== Reports of new Bagram review boards ==
On September 12, 2009, it was widely reported that unnamed officials told Eric Schmitt of The New York Times that the Obama administration was going to introduce new procedures to allow captives held in Bagram, and elsewhere in Afghanistan, to have their detention reviewed. Tina Foster, director of the International Justice Network, and a lawyer who represents four Bagram captives, was critical of the new rules:

These sound almost exactly like the rules the Bush Administration crafted for Guanatmamo that were struck down by the Supreme Court or at least found to be an inadequate substitute for judicial review. They're adopting this thing that [former Vice President] Cheney and his lot dreamt up out of whole cloth. To adopt Gitmo-like procedures seems to me like sliding in the wrong direction.

According to Radio Free Europe, Amnesty International's Asia-Pacific director, Sam Zia Zarifi, paraphrasing Major General Douglas M. Stone's report on the US's detentions in Afghanistan: "pointed out that the lack of a legal structure for Bagram means that it is undermining the rule of law in Afghanistan and it has caused a lot of resentment among Afghans."

== US handover of Bagram prison to the Afghan government ==
=== Memorandum of Understanding for the transfer of control ===
A Memorandum of Understanding to transfer control of the Parwan Detention Facility from the U.S. to Afghanistan was signed on March 9, 2012. According to Al Jazeera, the agreement: "will put an Afghan general in charge of Parwan [...] within days, [...] but will also give a six-month window to gradually transfer detainees to Afghan oversight. According to the document, the U.S. will continue to provide logistical support for 12 months and a joint US-Afghan commission will decide on any detainee releases until a more permanent pact is adopted." The memorandum of understanding also shifted responsibility for all U.S. detention facilities in the country to Afghanistan. A further clause provides for a committee, made up of the Afghan defense minister and the commander of the American military in Afghanistan, to decide jointly on releases.

=== Transferal ceremony ===
The U.S. military handed control of the prison on September 10, 2012, at which 16 prisoners, all wearing matching gray sweaters, were released. Army Col. Robert M. Taradash, who had overseen the prison, represented coalition forces. "We transferred more than 3,000 Afghan detainees into your custody ... and ensured that those who would threaten the partnership of Afghanistan and coalition forces will not return to the battlefield," said Col. Robert Taradash, the only U.S. official at the ceremony. "Our Afghan security forces are well trained and we are happy that today they are exercising their capability in taking the responsibility of prisoners independently and guarding the prisoners," said acting Defence Minister Enayatullah Nazari. "We are taking the responsibility from foreign forces." "Now, the Bagram prison is converted to one of Afghanistan's regular prisons where the innocents will be freed and the rest of the prisoners will be sentenced according to the laws of Afghanistan," a statement by Afghan President Hamid Karzai said, who did not attend the ceremony.

=== Prisoner transfer ===
Since the Memorandum's signing the U.S. had transferred 3,182 detainees to Afghan control according to Afghan Army General Ghulam Farouk. "Some 99 percent of the detainees captured before 9 March have already been transferred to Afghan authority, but we have paused the transfer of the remaining detainees until our concerns are met," said Jamie Graybeal, a spokesman for the U.S.-led military coalition. "There are concerns on the U.S. side about division in the Afghan government over internment and that it is not constitutional," said Rachel Reid, a senior policy adviser on Afghanistan for the Open Society Foundations. "The basic concern is that if they don't have internment, they will be released." On the flip side of the legal issue, some Afghan legal experts are worried about Afghan officials abusing any authority to hold detainees without trial. "Consider the fact that even our regular laws are ignored by powerful people," said Abdul Qawi Afzali of the Legal Aid Organization Afghanistan. "What will happen when you give them the actual, legal power to detain people like this law does?"

=== Delays and prisoner transfer concerns ===
The U.S. refused to hand over hundreds of detainees that they thought might be immediately released. An editorial in Hasht-e Sobh newspaper noted: "The government has not had a good track record in maintaining inmates and prisons in recent years ... The government has repeatedly called the Taliban their brothers and Taliban fighters detained on suicide-attack charges have been repeatedly released without trial."

On November 18, 2012, Afghanistan's president Karzai accused US forces of continuing to capture and detain Afghans in violation of the handover agreement signed earlier in 2012. Karzai decried the continued arrest of Afghans by US forces and said some detainees were still being held by US troops even though Afghan judges have ruled that they should be released. During a meeting with Afghan President Karzai on January 11, 2013, U.S. President Obama and his counterpart agreed that the U.S. would hand over full control of Afghan prisoners and prisons to Afghanistan,

=== Formal handover ===
On March 25, 2013, the formal hand-over of the facility was made public. In a statement it was said that the hand-over followed after a week of negotiations between US and Afghan officials "which includes assurances that inmates who "pose a danger" to Afghans and international forces will continue to be detained under Afghan law."

=== Remaining prisoners ===
When the US relinquished control of the prison, now called Parwan Detention Facility, to Afghan security forces in December 2014, Washington renounced responsibility for the six remaining former US prisoners held there, according to Jenifer Fenton.

The six men—two Tunisians, two Tajiks, an Uzbek and an Egyptian, whose identities have been confirmed by the Pentagon—included Redha al-Najar of Tunisia. He had the distinction of being the first CIA prisoner held at an Afghanistan facility called detention site Cobalt—notorious in U.S. security circles as "the Salt Pit." The Tunisians were repatriated. One Tajik man, Said Jamaluddin, Internment Serial Number 4057, was repatriated from Afghanistan to Tajikistan, where he faces almost-certain ill-treatment, according to legal advocates from the Allard K. Lowenstein International Human Rights Clinic at Yale Law School, who are working on his behalf. The clinic believes his brother Abdul Fatah, ISN 4058, was also forcibly sent back.

== Taliban takeover ==
Following the US withdrawal, the Taliban swept into the prison and freed thousands of prisoners, including senior Al-Qaeda and Taliban figures from the prison complex.

== See also ==
- Ameen Mohammad Albakri
- List of prisons in Afghanistan
- Joint Task Force 435
- Task Force 373, who captured many of the prisoners
- Killing of Dilawar, prisoner that was tortured to death
