= Grierson Awards =

British annual documentary film awards

The Grierson Awards
- Awarded for: Innovative and exciting documentary and factual filmmaking
- Sponsored by: The Grierson Trust
- Date: 9 November 2023
- Country: United Kingdom
- First award: 1972; 54 years ago
- Website: griersontrust.org/grierson-awards

Grierson: The British Documentary Awards, commonly known as The Grierson Awards, are awards bestowed by The Grierson Trust to recognise innovative and exciting documentary films, in honour of the pioneering Scottish documentary filmmaker John Grierson.

The inaugural award was given in 1972 and since then the awards have become an annual fixture. In 2000, The Grierson Trust forged a link with the UK Film Council in order to expand and add prestige to the awards. The awards have grown in stature and recognition over the years.

== Awards trophy ==
The awards trophy is in the form of a bust of John Grierson. Sculpted posthumously by Ivor Roberts-Jones, it was struck in a limited edition of 10, with three copies held by the Trust.

Originally, the trophy was given to the award winner for one year before being returned and presented to the next recipient.

== John Grierson ==
John Grierson was a leading documentary filmmaker, and he has also been attributed to have coined the name "documentary". He was born in Scotland in 1898. Grierson was the founder of a new movement of documentary film in the 1930s. He started the Empire Marketing Board Film Unit, and in 1933 the GPO Film Unit, gathering together such diverse and exciting talents as Humphrey Jennings, Paul Rotha and Alberto Cavalcanti. His ground-breaking work on the Scottish herring fleet, Drifters, had its premiere in 1929 alongside the first British showing of Sergei Eisenstein's Battleship Potemkin. In 1936, he produced the celebrated Night Mail, directed by Harry Watt with script by W.H. Auden and score by Benjamin Britten.

== Grierson Trust ==
Founded as the Grierson Memorial Trust in 1972, shortly after the death of John Grierson, the Grierson Trust is a registered UK charity that exists to celebrate the best factual and documentary filmmaking from both the UK and globally. The trust also nurtures factual TV talent via training and mentoring schemes. Since its inception it has had nine chairs:

- 1972 – ?: Basil Wright
- ? – 1987: Edgar Anstey
- 1989 – 2000: John Chittock
- 2000 – 2002: Larry Chrisfield
- 2002 – 2006: Edward Mirzoeff
- 2006 – 2008: Jenny Barraclough
- 2008 – 2010: Murray Weston
- 2010 – 2013: Dawn Airey
- 2013 – Present: Lorraine Heggessey

In 2022, to mark its fiftieth anniversary, the Trust published its 50 must-see documentaries since its inception in 1972.

== Judging ==
As of 2023, the Grierson Awards employ a two-stage judging process, with each individual entry reviewed by a minimum of three members of the Trust.

A long list of eight nominees for each category is drawn up; then the contenders are judged by five-person juries, drawn from documentary makers, broadcasters and subject experts. The jurors then decide on the final four shortlisted nominations, and subsequently the winner for each category.

The judges look for evidence of quality, integrity, creativity, originality and overall excellence. They also consider the steps taken by producers to ensure the best diversity and inclusion practices, as this is considered key to the integrity and quality of any documentary. Since 2020, entrants to all but the Best Student Documentary category have been required to provide a statement on diversity and inclusion.

The Grierson Trustees' Award and Grierson Hero of the Year Award are honorary and not selected by the jury process.

== 2000–2025 winners ==
=== 2025 winners ===
All entries to the 2025 Grierson Awards must have had their first UK screening between June 1, 2024 to May 31, 2025.

Hosted by Rachel Parris: 18 November 2025 at The Roundhouse, London.
Best Single Documentary – Domestic	Best Single Documentary – International	Best Current Affairs Documentary
Winner — Witches (Mubi) dir. Elizabeth Sankey	Winner — No Other Land (Channel 4) dir. Basel Adra, Hamdan Ballal, Yuval Abraham, and Rachel Szor	Winner — Life and Death in Gaza (BBC) dir. Natasha Cox, Lara El Gibaly, Haya Al Badarneh, and Sarah Keeling
Best Arts Documentary	Best Returning Documentary Series	Best Sports Documentary
Winner — Two Strangers Trying Not to Kill Each Other: dir. Jacob Perlmutter, and Manon Ouimet	Winner — Life and Death Row (BBC)	Winner — Unbreakable: England 2003 (TNT Sports) dir. Chris Hay
Best History Documentary	Best Science and Natural History Documentary	Best Crime and Justice Documentary
Winner — The Zelenky Story – Episode 1 (BBC) dir. Michael Waldman	Winner — Britain's Nuclear Bomb Scandal: Our Story (BBC) dir. Simon Rawles	Winner — Bibaa & Nicole: Murder in the Park – Episode 1 (Sky) dir. Alex Thomas
Best Popular Culture Documentary	Best Cinema Documentary	Best Documentary Series
Winner — Grand Theft Hamlet (Mubi) dir. Pinny Grylls and Sam Crane	Winner — Mediha: dir. Hasan Oswald and Mediha Alhamad	Winner — Bibaa & Nicole: Murder in the Park (Netflix) dir. Alex Thomas
Best Student Documentary	Best Documentary Short	Best Documentary Presenter
Winner — Welcome Home Freckles: dir. Huiju Park	Winner — Chernobyl: My Promised Land (Sky Documentaries) dir. Mark Dominic Devlin	Winner — Blindboy Boatclub: The Land of Slaves & Scholars (RTÉ)
Grierson Trustees' Award
Recipient — Rupert Houseman

=== 2024 winners ===
The eligibility window was for documentaries broadcast or available to stream in the UK between 1 June 2023 and 31 May 2024.

Hosted by Kerry Godliman: 7 November 2024 at The Roundhouse, London.
Best Single Documentary – Domestic	Best Single Documentary – International	Best Current Affairs Documentary
Winner — Me and the voice in My Head: (Channel 4). dir. Tommy Forbes and Tom Green	Winner — My Name is Happy: (Channel 4). dir. Ayşe Toprak and Nick Read	Winner — 20 Days in Mariupol: (Associated Press, PBS Frontline). dir. Mstyslav Chernov
Best Arts Documentary	Best Music Documentary	Best Sports Documentary
Winner — Yellow Door: '90s Lo-fi Film Club: (Netflix). dir. Lee Hyukrae	Winner — Milli Vanilli: (Paramount+) dir. Luke Korem	Winner — Mighty Penguins: dir. Louis Myles and Ahmed Twaij
Best History Documentary	Best Science Documentary	Best Natural History or Environmental Documentary
Winner — Stamped from the Beginning, (Netflix). dir. Roger Ross Williams	Winner — The Jennings vs Alzheimer's (BBC). dir. Niamh Kennedy	Winner — Silverback (BBC). dir. Miles Blayden-Ryall
Best Popular Culture Documentary	Best Cinema Documentary	Best Documentary Series
Winner — Big Zuu Goes to Mecca (BBC). dir. Adnan Ahmed	Winner — 20 Days in Mariupol: (Associated Press, PBS Frontline). dir. Mstyslav Chernov	Winner — The Push: Murder on the Cliff (Channel 4). dir. Anna Hall
Best Student Documentary	Best Documentary Short	Best Documentary Presenter
Winner — The Waiter, the Scientist and Jenny: (NFTS). dir. Joe Snelling	Winner — Ted & Noel: (Channel 4). dir. Julia Alcamo	Winner — Joe Tracini for Me and the Voice in My Head (Channel 4)
Grierson Trustees' Award
Recipient — Stacey Dooley

=== 2023 winners ===
The eligibility window was for documentaries broadcast or available to stream in the UK between 1 June 2022 and 31 May 2023.

Hosted by Nish Kumar: 9 November 2023 at the Queen Elizabeth Hall, London.
Best Single Documentary – International	Best Single Documentary – Domestic	Best Current Affairs Documentary
Winner — All That Breathes: (HBO Documentary Films). dir. Shaunak Sen	Winner — Lyra: (Channel 4). dir. Alison Millar	Winner — Retrograde: (National Geographic Documentary Films). dir. Matthew Heineman
Best Arts Documentary	Best Music Documentary	Best Sports Documentary
Winner — "Sr.": (Netflix). dir. Chris Smith	Winner — Moonage Daydream: dir. Brett Morgen	Winner — The Real Mo Farah: (BBC). dir. Leo Burley
Best History Documentary	Best Science Documentary	Best Natural History Documentary
Winner — Once Upon a Time in Northern Ireland, Episode 3: (BBC). dir. James Bluemel / Sian Mcilwaine	Winner — Inside Our Autistic Minds, Episode 1: (BBC). dir. Joe Myerscough / Emma Jones	Winner — Big Oil vs. the World, Episode 1: "Denial": (BBC). dir. Jane McMullen
Best Entertaining Documentary	Best Cinema Documentary	Best Student Documentary
Winner — Pepsi, Where's My Jet? Episode 1: The Kid from Seattle: (Netflix). dir. Andrew Renzi	Winner — All That Breathes: dir. Shaunak Sen	Winner — With Woman: (NFTS). dir. Mia Harvey
Best Constructed Documentary Series	Best Documentary Series	Best Documentary Short
Winner — Monster Factory: (Apple TV+). dir. Galen Summer / Naiti Gámez	Winner — Once Upon a Time in Northern Ireland: (BBC). dir. James Bluemel / Sian Mcilwaine	Winner — Lady of the Gobi: (The Guardian). dir. Khoroldorj Choijoovanchig
Best Documentary Presenter	Grierson Trustees' Award	Grierson Hero of the Year Award
Winner — Hannah Fry for Making Sense of Cancer with Hannah Fry: (BBC)	Recipient — Anna Hall	Recipient — Deaf & Disabled People in TV (DDPTV)

=== 2022 winners (50th anniversary awards) ===
The eligibility window was for documentaries broadcast or available to stream in the UK between 1 June 2021 and 31 May 2022.

Hosted by Rosie Jones and AJ Odudu: 10 November 2023 at the Queen Elizabeth Hall, London.
Best Single Documentary – International	Best Single Documentary – Domestic	Best Current Affairs Documentary
Winner — The Reason I Jump: (Disney+). dir. Jerry Rothwell	Winner — Grenfell: The Untold Story: (Channel 4). dir. James Newton	Winner — Exposure - Afghanistan: No Country for Women: (ITV). dir. Karim Shah. Reporter: Ramita Navai.
Best Arts Documentary	Best Music Documentary	Best Sports Documentary
Winner — SALT by Selina Thompson: (BBC). dir. Alison Ramsay	Winner — Jeen-Yuhs: A Kanye Trilogy, "Act I: VISION": (Netflix). dir. Coodie & Chike	Winner — Citizen Ashe: (BBC). dir. Rex Miller / Sam Pollard
Best History Documentary	Best Science Documentary	Best Natural History Documentary
Winner — The Missing Children: (ITV). dir. Tanya Stephan; Highly commended — Memory Box: Echoes of 9/11: (Sky Documentaries). dir. David Belton / Bjorn Johnson	Winner — A Year in the Ice: The Arctic Drift: (Channel 4). dir. Ashley Morris	Winner — The Green Planet, Episode 1: "Tropical Worlds": (BBC). dir. Mike Gunton; Highly commended — My Garden of a Thousand Bees: (Sky Nature). dir. David Allen
Best Entertaining Documentary	Best Cinema Documentary	Best Student Documentary
Winner — Twas the Fight Before Christmas: (Apple TV+). dir. Becky Read	Winner — Summer of Soul (...or, When the Revolution Could Not be Televised): dir. Ahmir 'Questlove' Thompson	Winner — Ten by Ten: dir. Jami L. Bennett; Highly commended — Daughters of the Sea: (London College of Communication). dir. Laura Esteban
Best Constructed Documentary Series	Best Documentary Series	Best Documentary Short
Winner — We Are Black and British: (BBC). dir. Ryan Samuda	Winner — Jeen-Yuhs: A Kanye Trilogy: (Netflix). dir. Coodie & Chike	Winner — Three Songs for Benazir: (Netflix). dir. Elizabeth Mirzaei / Gulistan Mirzaei; Highly commended — Freedom Swimmer: dir. Olivia Martin McGuire
Best Documentary Presenter	Grierson Trustees' Award	Grierson Hero of the Year Award
Winners — Jamie MacDonald & Jamie O'Leary for Blind Ambition: (BBC)	Recipient — Roger Graef OBE (posthumous award)	Recipient — Clare Richards (Documentary director and founder of We Are Doc Women)

=== 2021 winners ===
After the previous years online only ceremony, this year marked a return to an in-person event. The eligibility window was for documentaries that had their first UK screening between 1 June 2020 and 31 May 2021. Best Cinema Documentary was not awarded for the first time since 2003, but two new categories were introduced, Best Sports Documentary and Hero of the Year, whilst the award for Best Arts and Music Documentary was split into two separate awards.

Hosted by Patrick Kielty: 10 November 2021 at the Queen Elizabeth Hall, London.
Best Single Documentary – International	Best Single Documentary – Domestic	Best Current Affairs Documentary
Winner — Collective: Unravelling a Scandal (BBC Four). dir. Alexander Nanau	Winner — David Attenborough: A Life on Our Planet (Netflix). dir. Jonnie Hughes, Alastair Fothergill & Keith Scholey	Winner — Storyville" Welcome to Chechnya: The Gay Purge (BBC Four). dir. David France; Highly Commended — Undercover in the Schools that Chain Boys (BBC Arabic). dir. Jessica Kelly. Reporter. Fath Al-Rahman Al-Hamdani
Best Arts Documentary	Best Music Documentary	Best Sports Documentary
Winner — The Painter and the Thief (Sky Arts). dir. Benjamin Ree	Winner — Biggie: I Got a Story to Tell. (Netflix). dir. Emmett Malloy	Winner — Athlete A: (Netflix). dir. Bonni Cohen / Jon Shenk
Best History Documentary	Best Science Documentary	Best Natural History Documentary
Winner — Once Upon a Time in Iraq: Episode 2 "Insurgency" (BBC Two). dir. James Bluemel	Winner — Storyville: Locked In - Breaking the Silence. (BBC Four). dir. Xavier Alford; Highly Commended — The Surgeon's Cut: Episode 1. (Netflix). dir. Lucy Blakstad, Stephen Cooter, James Newton & Sophie Robinson	Winner — My Octopus Teacher: (Netflix). dir. Pippa Ehrlich / James Reed
Best Entertaining Documentary	Best Cinema Documentary	Best Student Documentary
Winner — The Mole: Undercover in North Korea (BBC Four). dir. Mads Brügger	Not awarded	Winner — Tease: (NFTS). dir. Jessica Brady
Best Constructed Documentary Series	Best Documentary Series	Best Documentary Short
Winner — The School That Tried to End Racism: (Channel 4). dir. Rachel Dupuy & David Harris	Winner — Once Upon a Time in Iraq: Episode 2 "Insurgency" (BBC Two). dir. James Bluemel	Winner — A Love Song for Latasha: (Netflix). dir. Sophia Nahli Allison
Best Documentary Presenter	Grierson Trustees' Award	Grierson Hero of the Year Award
Winner — Yinka Bokinni for Damilola: The Boy Next Door (Channel 4); Highly Commended — Dr. Chris & Xand Van Tulleken for Surviving the Virus: My Brother & Me (BBC One)	Recipient — Tabitha Jackson	Recipient — Serena Kennedy

=== 2020 winners ===
The eligibility window was for documentaries that had their first UK screening between 1 June 2019 and 31 May 2020.

Hosted by Sara Pascoe: 10 November 2020. Virtual / online ceremony due to COVID-19 pandemic.
Best Single Documentary – Domestic	Best Single Documentary – International	Best Historical Documentary
Winner — Suicidal: In Our Own Words. (Channel 5). dir. Rachel Harvie; Highly Commended — The Family Secret: (Channel 4). dir. Anna Hall / Brian Woods	Winner — Crip Camp (Netflix). dir. Nicole Newnham / Jim LeBrecht; Highly Commended — Untouchable: The Rise and Fall of Harvey Weinstein. (BBC Two). dir. Ursula Macfarlane	Winner — Jade: The Reality Star Who Changed Britain - Episode 1. (Channel 4). dir. Robert Coldstream; Highly Commended — Crip Camp (Netflix). dir. Nicole Newnham / Jim LeBrecht
Best Documentary Series	Best Constructed Documentary Series	Best Arts or Music Documentary
Winner — Jade: The Reality Star Who Changed Britain - Episode 1. (Channel 4). dir. Robert Coldstream	Winner — The Restaurant That Makes Mistakes: (Channel 4). dir. Benjamin Leigh; Highly Commended — Long Lost Family: (ITV). dir. Sally Benton, Clare Bradbury & Susie Attwood	Winner — Show Me the Picture: The Story of Jim Marshall. dir. Alfred George Bailey; Highly Commended — Terms and Conditions: A UK Drill Story. (YouTube Originals). dir. Brian Hill
Best Student Documentary	Best Entertaining Documentary	Best Science Documentary
Winner — Miss Curvy: (NFTS). dir. Ghada Eldemellawy; Highly Commended — Inside a Marriage: (NFTS). dir. Ben Cheetham	Winner — The Misadventures of Romesh Ranganathan: "Zimbabwe" (BBC Two). dir. Chris Cottam	Winner — War in the Blood (BBC Two). dir. Arthur Cary
Best Cinema Documentary	Best Current Affairs Documentary	Best Documentary Presenter
Winner — For Sama: dir. Waad al Kateab / Edward Watts; Highly Commended — Honeyland: dir. Tamara Kotevska / Ljubomir Stefanov	Winner — Undercover: Inside China's Digital Gulag. (ITV). dir. Robin Barnwell; Highly Commended — Undercover with the Clerics: Iraq's Secret Sex Trade (BBC News Arabic). dir. Patrick (Paddy) Wells	Winner — Mobeen Azhar for Hometown: A Killing. (BBC Three)
Best Natural History Documentary	Best Documentary Short	Trustees' Award
Winner — The Last Igloo: (BBC Four). dir. Christian Collerton	Winner — Country Girl: dir. Ellen Evans	Recipient — Asif Kapadia

=== 2019 winners ===
The eligibility window was for documentaries that had their first UK screening between 1 June 2018 and 31 May 2019.

Hosted by Rob Rinder: 14 November 2019 at the Queen Elizabeth Hall, London.
Best Single Documentary – Domestic	Best Single Documentary – International	Best Historical Documentary
Winner — Stabbed: Britain's Knife Crime Crisis (BBC One). dir. Toby Trackman	Winner — Storyville - "The Trial of Ratko Mladic" (BBC Four). dir. Henry Singer / Rob Miller; Highly Commended — Storyville - "Under the Wire" dir. Chris Martin	Winner — The Last Survivors (BBC Two). dir. Arthur Cary; Highly Commended — A Dangerous Dynasty: House of Assad. (BBC Two). dir. The Production Team
Best Documentary Series	Best Constructed Documentary Series	Best Arts or Music Documentary
Winner — Prison: (Channel 4). dir. Paddy Wivell; Highly Commended — Leaving Neverland: (Channel 4). dir. Dan Reed	Winner — First Dates Hotel: (Channel 4). dir. The Production Team	Winner — The Football Club: Artist in Residence. (Channel 4). dir. Marcus Plowright
Best Student Documentary	Best Entertaining Documentary	Best Science Documentary
Winner — Ravens: dir. Karl Forchhammer	Winner — Three Identical Strangers: dir. Tim Wardle; Highly Commended — Bros: After the Screaming Stops. (BBC Four). dir. David Soutar / Joe Pearlman	Winner — The Parkinson's Drug Trial: A Miracle Cure? (BBC Two). dir. Jemima Harrison
Best Cinema Documentary	Best Current Affairs Documentary	Best Documentary Presenter
Winner — Minding the Gap: dir. Bing Liu; Highly Commended — Matangi/Maya/M.I.A. dir. Steve Loveridge	Winner — Iraq: A State of Mind (BBC Arabic). dir. Namak Khoshnaw; Highly Commended — Panorama: "Escape from Dubai: The Mystery of the Missing Princess" (BBC Two). dir. Jane McMullen	Winner — Duwayne Brooks for Stabbed: Britain's Knife Crime Crisis (BBC One).
Best Natural History Documentary	Best Documentary Short	Trustees' Award
Winner — Drowning in Plastic: (BBC One). dir. Tom Watt-Smith	Winner — Zion (Netflix). dir. Floyd Russ	Recipient — Dorothy Byrne

=== 2018 winners ===
The eligibility window was for documentaries that had their first UK screening between 1 June 2017 and 31 May 2018.

Hosted by Susan Calman: 6 November 2018 at the Queen Elizabeth Hall, London.
Best Single Documentary – Domestic	Best Single Documentary – International	Best Historical Documentary
Winner — Kingdom of Us: dir. Lucy Cohen	Winner — Storyville: The Work - Four Days to Redemption. (BBC Four). dir. Jairus McLeary / Gethin Aldous; Highly Commended — Icarus: (Netflix). dir. Bryan Fogel	Winner — Stephen: The Murder that Changed a Nation -"The Loss of Joy." (BBC One). dir. James Rogan; Highly Commended — A House Through Time: Episode 2. (BBC Two). dir. Stuart Elliott
Best Documentary Series	Best Constructed Documentary Series	Best Arts or Music Documentary
Winner — Stephen: The Murder that Changed a Nation - "The Loss of Joy." (BBC One). dir. James Rogan	Winner — Old People's Home for 4 Year Olds: (Channel 4). dir. Benjamin Leigh	Winner — Leonora Carrington - The Lost Surrealist: (BBC Four). dir. Teresa Griffiths
Best Student Documentary	Best Entertaining Documentary	Best Science Documentary
Winner — Fake News Fairytale: dir. Kate Stonehill	Winner — Celebrity Hunted - Episode 1: (Channel 4). dir. Production Team	Winner — Chris Packham: Asperger's and Me. (BBC Two). dir. Charlie Russell; Highly Commended — The Natural World: Attenborough's Wonder of Eggs: (BBC Two). dir. Mike Birkhead / Beth Jones
Best Cinema Documentary	Best Current Affairs Documentary	Best Documentary Presenter
Winner — The Work: dir. Jairus McLeary / Gethin Aldous	Winner — Panorama: "Undercover - Britain's Immigration Secrets." (BBC One). dir. Joe Plomin. Undercover reporter: Callum Tulley; Highly Commended — The Fight for Mosul: (Channel 4). dir. Olivier Sarbil / James Jones	Winner — Patrick Kielty for My Dad, the Peace Deal and Me (BBC One); Highly Commended — Professor Green for Working Class White Men (Channel 4)
Best Natural History Documentary	Best Documentary Short	Trustees' Award
Winner — The Natural World: H is for Hawk: A New Chapter (BBC Two). dir. Mike Birkhead, Beth Jones; Highly Commended — Blue Planet II: "One Ocean." (BBC One). dir. Production Team	Winner — Landline: dir. Matt Houghton; Highly Commended — Circle: dir. Jayisha Patel	Recipient — Sir Trevor McDonald

=== 2017 winners ===
The award for Best Newcomer was replaced with an award for Best Documentary Short in 2017.

Hosted by Stephen Mangan: 5 November 2017 at the Mermaid Theatre, London
Best Single Documentary – Domestic	Best Single Documentary – International	Best Historical Documentary
Winner — Hillsborough (BBC Two). dir. Daniel Gordon	Winner — Machines: dir. Rahul Jain; Highly Commended — Last Days of Solitary; (BBC Four). dir. Dan Edge / Lauren Mucciolo	Winner — 13th (Netflix). dir. Ava DuVernay; Highly Commended — Aberfan: The Green Hollow (BBC Four). dir. Pip Broughton
Best Documentary Series	Best Constructed Documentary Series	Best Arts Documentary
Winner — Exodus: Our Journey to Europe (BBC Two). dir. James Bluemel, Jack MacInnes, Paul Glynn & Robin Barnwell	Winner — Muslims Like Us (BBC Two). dir. Emma Findlay, David Foulkes, Zoe Hines, Lily Murray, Libby Overton & Will Rowson	Winner — Paula Rego, Secrets & Stories (BBC Two). dir. Nick Willing
Best Student Documentary	Best Entertaining Documentary	Best Science Documentary
Winner — Acta Non Verba: dir. Yvann Yagchi	Winner — 999: What's Your Emergency? - Nobody ever said, 'When I grow up I want to answer 999 calls.' (Channel Four). dir. James Incledon, Sam Barnes & Chris Rowe	Winner — Forces of Nature with Brian Cox: Episode 2 "Somewhere in Spacetime." (BBC One). dir. Stephen Cooter
Best Cinema Documentary	Best Current Affairs Documentary	Best Documentary Presenter
Winner — Weiner: dir. Josh Kriegman / Elyse Steinberg	Winner — Goodbye Aleppo: (BBC Arabic). dir. Christine Garabedian	Winner — Grayson Perry for Grayson Perry: All Man (Channel Four)
Best Natural History Documentary	Best Documentary Short	Trustees' Award
Winner — Wild Ireland: Episode 1 "The Edge of the World." (BBC Two). dir. John Murray / Cepa Giblin	Winner — Fish Story: dir. Charlie Lyne	Recipient — Alastair Fothergill

=== 2016 winners ===
This year saw the Best Science or Natural History Documentary award split into two separate categories and a new award for Best Constructed Documentary Series introduced. The eligibility window was for documentaries that had their first UK screening between 1 May 2015 to 30 April 2016.

Hosted by Jon Culshaw: 7 November 2016 at the Mermaid Theatre, London
Best Documentary on a Contemporary Issue – Domestic	Best Documentary on a Contemporary Issue – International	Best Historical Documentary
Winner — How To Die: Simon's Choice. (BBC Two). dir. Rowan Deacon	Winner — How to Change the World: dir. Jerry Rothwell	Winner — Attacking the Devil: dir. Jacqui Morris / David Morris
Best Documentary Series	Best Constructed Documentary Series	Best Arts Documentary
Winner — The Murder Detectives: (Channel 4). dir. Dave Nath	Winner — The Real Marigold Hotel (BBC Two). dir. Tom Currie	Winner — Amy, dir. Asif Kapadia
Best Student Documentary	Best Entertaining Documentary	Best Science Documentary
Winner — Women in Sink: dir. Iris Zaki	Winner — Secret Life of 4, 5 and 6 Year Olds: Episode 2. (Channel 4). dir. Teresa Watkins, Emily Lawson & Nicola Brown	Winner — Oak Tree: Nature's Greatest Survivor. (BBC Four). dir. Nic Stacey
Best Cinema Documentary	Best Documentary on Current Affairs	Best Documentary Presenter
Winner — Cartel Land dir. Matthew Heineman	Winner — This World: "Outbreak - The Truth About Ebola." (BBC Two). dir. Dan Edge	Winner — Paul Mayhew Archer for Inside Out South: "Parkinson's - The Funny Side." (BBC One)
Best Natural History Documentary	Best Newcomer Award	Trustees' Award
Winner — The Hunt: The Hardest Challenge. (BBC One). dir. Huw Cordey	Winner — Where You're Meant To Be: dir. Paul Fegan	Recipient — Louis Theroux

=== 2015 winners ===
The Readers' Choice Award was dropped in this year. The eligibility window was for documentaries that had their first UK screening between 1 May 2014 and 30 April 2015.

Hosted by Gareth Malone: 2 November 2015 at the Mermaid Theatre, London
Best Documentary on a Contemporary Issue – Domestic	Best Documentary on a Contemporary Issue – International	Best Historical Documentary
Winner — The Paedophile Hunter: (Channel 4). dir. Dan Reed	Winner — Citizenfour dir. Laura Poitras	Winner — Our World War: The First Day. (BBC Three). dir. Bruce Goodison
Best Documentary Series	Best Newcomer Award	Best Arts Documentary
Winner — The Romanians are Coming (Channel 4). dir. James Bluemel	Winner — The Lost Gold of the Highlands (Garnet's Gold) (BBC Four). dir. Ed Perkins	Winner — 20,000 Days on Earth, dir. Iain Forsyth and Jane Pollard
Best Student Documentary	Best Entertaining Documentary	Best Science or Natural History Documentary
Winner — The Wolf, The Ship and the Little Green Bag, dir. Kathryn MacCorgarry Gray	Winner — Gogglebox: "Episode 6". (Channel 4). dir. Tina Alexander	Winner — Curing Cancer (Channel 4). dir. Brian Woods
Best Cinema Documentary	Best Documentary on Current Affairs	Documentary Presenter of the Year
Winner — Virunga, dir. Orlando von Einsiedel	Winner — Our War: Goodbye Afghanistan, (BBC Three). dir. Rowan Deacon	Winner — Grayson Perry for Who Are You? (Channel 4)
Trustees' Award
Recipient — Kim Longinotto

=== 2014 winners ===
The eligibility window was for documentaries that had their first UK screening between 1 May 2013 and 30 April 2014.

Hosted by Sue Perkins: 3 November 2014 at the Queen Elizabeth Hall, London
Best Documentary on a Contemporary Issue – Domestic	Best Documentary on a Contemporary Issue – International	Best Historical Documentary
Winner — The Murder Trial: (Channel 4). dir. Nick Holt	Winner — Dispatches: "Children on the Frontline." (Channel 4). dir. Anthony Wonke / Marcel Mettelsiefen	Winner — The Iraq War: Regime Change. (BBC Two). dir. Paul Mitchell, Norma Percy & Charlie Smith
Best Documentary Series	Best Newcomer Award	Best Arts Documentary
Winner — Educating Yorkshire (Channel 4). dir. David Brindley / Grace Reynold	Winner — Last Chance School: (Channel 4). dir. Marc Williamson	Winner — Colin Davis in His Own Words: (BBC Four). dir. John Bridcut
Best Student Documentary	Most Entertaining Documentary	Best Science or Natural History Documentary
Winner — Sing Your Heart Out: dir. Peter Akar	Winner — Our Gay Wedding: The Musical. (Channel 4). dir. Claire Lewis, Louise Hooper & Ellen Hobson	Winner — Particle Fever: dir. Mark Levinson
Best Cinema Documentary	Best Documentary on Current Affairs	Documentary Presenter of the Year
Winner — Cutie and the Boxer: dir. Zachary Heinzerling	Winner — Dispatches: "Hunted." (Channel 4). dir. Ben Steele	Winner — Rupert Everett for Love for Sale with Rupert Everett: (Channel 4)
Readers' Choice Award	Trustees' Award	
Winner — Educating Yorkshire (Channel 4). dir. David Brindley / Grace Reynold	Recipient — Alex Graham	

=== 2013 winners ===
This year saw the introduction of awards for Best Documentary on Current Affairs, Documentary Presenter of the Year and the Readers' Choice Award.

Hosted by Claudia Winkleman: 4 November 2013 at the Queen Elizabeth Hall, London
Best Documentary on a Contemporary Issue – Domestic	Best Documentary on a Contemporary Issue – International	Best Historical Documentary
Winner — 7/7: One Day in London. (BBC Two). dir. Ben Anthony	Winner — Law of the Jungle: dir. Michael Christoffersen, Hans La Cour	Winner — The Secret History of Our Streets: "Deptford High Street". (BBC Two). dir. Joseph Bullman
Best Documentary Series	Best Newcomer Award	Best Arts Documentary
Winner — The Year The Town Hall Shrank: (BBC Four). dir. David Nath / James Newton	Winner — High Tech, Low Life: dir. Steve Maing	Winner — Imagine... The Fatwa - Salman's Story. (BBC One). dir. Jill Nicholls
Best Student Documentary	Most Entertaining Documentary	Best Science or Natural History Documentary
Winner — Sodiq. dir. Adeyemi Michael	Winner — Nina Conti: A Ventriloquist's Story - Her Master's Voice. (BBC Four). dir. Nina Conti	Winner — How to Build a Bionic Man (Channel 4). dir. Tom Coveney
Best Cinema Documentary	Best Documentary on Current Affairs	Documentary Presenter of the Year
Winner — The House I Live In dir. Eugene Jarecki	Winner — Syria: Across the Lines. (Channel 4). dir. Olly Lambert	Winner — Grayson Perry for All in the Best Possible Taste with Grayson Perry: (Channel 4)
Readers' Choice Award	Trustees' Award	
Winner — The Secret History of Our Streets (BBC Two). dir. Joseph Bullman	Recipient — John Battsek	

=== 2012 winners ===
Hosted by Grayson Perry: 6 November 2012 at the Empire, Leicester Square, London.
Best Documentary on a Contemporary Issue – Domestic	Best Documentary on a Contemporary Issue – International	Best Historical Documentary
Winner — Terry Pratchett: Choosing to Die (BBC Two). dir. Charlie Russell	Winner — Hell and Back Again (More4). dir. Danfung Dennis	Winner — The Love of Books: A Sarajevo Story. (BBC Four). dir. Sam Hobkinson
Best Documentary Series	Best Newcomer Award	Best Arts Documentary
Winner — Protecting Our Children (BBC Two). dir. Sacha Mirzoeff / Emma Burman	Winner — Gypsy Blood (Channel 4). dir. Leo Maguire	Winner — Jeremy Deller: Middle Class Hero - A Culture Show Special. (BBC Two). dir. Jack Cocker
Best Student Documentary	Most Entertaining Documentary	Best Science Documentary
Winner — The Betrayal: dir. Karen Winther	Winner — The Bengali Detective: dir. Phil Cox	Winner — After Life: The Strange Science of Decay (BBC Four). dir. Fred Hepburn
Best Cinema Documentary	Trustees' Award	
Winner — Bobby Fischer Against the World: dir. Liz Garbus	Recipient — Kevin Macdonald	

=== 2011 winners ===
This year saw the award for Best Documentary on a Contemporary Issue split into two; one for domestic productions and one of international. The award for Best Drama Documentary was replaced by an award for Best Student Documentary.

Hosted by Mariella Frostrup: 1 November 2011 at BFI Southbank, London
Best Documentary on a Contemporary Issue – Domestic	Best Documentary on a Contemporary Issue – International	Best Historical Documentary
Winner — Between Life and Death: (BBC One). dir. Nick Holt	Winner — Secret Iraq: The Insurgency. (BBC Two). dir. Sam Collyns	Winner — Fire in Babylon: dir. Stevan Riley
Best Documentary Series	Best Newcomer Award	Best Documentary on the Arts
Winner — Hugh's Fish Fight: (Channel 4). dir. Will Anderson	Winner — Storyville: Afghan Cricket Club - Out of the Ashes (BBC Four). dir. Timothy Albone / Lucy Martens	Winner — Bird on a Wire: (BBC Four). dir. Tony Palmer
Best Student Documentary	Most Entertaining Documentary	Best Science Documentary
Winner — Caring for Calum: dir. Lou McLoughlan	Winner — Bodysnatchers of New York: (More4). dir. Toby Dye	Winner — The Joy of Stats: (BBC Four). dir. Dan Hillman
Best Cinema Documentary	Trustees' Award	
Winner — The Arbor: dir. Clio Barnard	Recipient — John Pilger	

=== 2010 winners ===
Hosted by Sandi Toksvig: 2 November 2010 at BFI Southbank, London.
Best Documentary on a Contemporary Issue	Best Historical Documentary	Best Documentary Series
Winner — Moving to Mars: (More4). dir. Mat Whitecross	Winner — Requiem for Detroit: (BBC Two). dir. Julien Temple	Winner — The Force: (Channel 4). dir. Patrick Forbes
Best Newcomer Award	Best Documentary on the Arts	Best Drama Documentary
Winner — Sons of Cuba: dir. Andrew Lang	Winner — Arena: T.S. Eliot (BBC Two). dir. Adam Low	Winner — Endgame: (Channel 4). dir. Pete Travis
Most Entertaining Documentary	Best Science Documentary	Best Cinema Documentary
Winner — Exit Through the Gift Shop: dir. Banksy	Winner — Race and Intelligence: Science's Last Taboo (Channel 4). dir. David Hickman	Winner — Mugabe and the White African, dir. Lucy Bailey / Andrew Thompson
Trustees' Award
Recipient — Penny Woolcock

=== 2009 winners ===
The eligibility window was for documentaries first screened in the UK between 1 May 2008 and 30 April 2009.

Hosted by Andrew Marr: 3 November 2009 at BFI Southbank, London
Best Documentary on a Contemporary Issue	Best Historical Documentary	Best Documentary Series
Winner — Afghan Star: (More4). dir. Havana Marking	Winner — Thrilla in Manila: (More4). dir. John Dower	Winner — Iran and the West: (BBC Two). dir. Dai Richards, Delphine Jaudeau & Paul Mitchell
Best Newcomer Award	Best Documentary on the Arts	Best Drama Documentary
Winner — Storyville: I'm Not Dead Yet (BBC Four). dir. Elizabeth Stopford	Winner — The Mona Lisa Curse: (Channel 4). dir. Mandy Chang	Winner — House of Saddam: (BBC Two). dir. Alex Holmes / Jim O'Hanlon
Most Entertaining Documentary	Best Science Documentary	Best Cinema Documentary
Winner — The Yes Men Fix the World. dir. Andy Bichibaum / Mike Bonnano	Winner — Charles Darwin and the Tree of Life: (BBC One). dir. Sacha Mirzoeff	Winner — Burma VJ, dir. Anders Østergaard
Trustees' Award
Recipient — Norma Percy

=== 2008 winners ===
The Trustees' Award was not bestowed this year.

Hosted by Sue Perkins and Giles Coren: 20 November 2008 at the Royal Institution, London
Best Documentary on a Contemporary Issue	Best Historical Documentary	Best Documentary Series
Winner — The Lie of the Land: (Channel 4). dir. Molly Dineen	Winner — 1983: The Brink of Apocalypse (Channel 4). dir. Henry Chancellor	Winner — Andrew Marr's History of Modern Britain (BBC Two). dir. Tom Giles / Fatima Salaria
Best Newcomer Award	Best Documentary on the Arts	Best Drama Documentary
Winner — Here's Johnny, dir. Adam Lavis, William Hood & Katrina Mansoor	Winner — Here's Johnny, dir. Adam Lavis, William Hood & Katrina Mansoor	Winner — Battle for Haditha: (More4). dir. Nick Broomfield
Most Entertaining Documentary	Best Science Documentary	Best Cinema Documentary
Winner — Please Vote for Me (BBC Four). dir. Weijun Chen, Don Edkins & Mette Heide	Winner — Parallel Worlds, Parallel Lives (BBC Four). dir. Louise Lockwood	Winner — Joy Division, dir. Grant Gee

=== 2007 winners ===
The eligibility window was for documentaries first screened in the UK between 1 May 2006 and 30 April 2007.

Hosted by Nick Ross: 23 November 2007 at Savoy Place, London
Best Documentary on a Contemporary Issue	Best Historical Documentary	Best Documentary Series
Winner — Rain in My Heart (BBC Two). dir. Paul Watson	Winner — Hungary 1956: Our Revolution (BBC Four). dir. Mark Kidel	Winner — Anatomy of a Crime (BBC Two). dir. Steph Atkinson
Best Newcomer Award	Best Documentary on the Arts	Best Drama Documentary
Winner — No Man is an Island, dir. Sonja Linden	Winner — Imagine... Episode: "Who Cares About Art?" (BBC One). dir. Sam Hobkinson	Winner — Consent: (Channel 4). dir. Katie Bailiff
Most Entertaining Documentary	Best Science Documentary	Best Cinema Documentary
Winner — Ray Gosling (BBC Four). dir. Amanda Reilly	Winner — Monkeys, Rats and Me (BBC Two). dir. Adam Wishart	Winner — Deep Water, dir. Louise Osmond / Jerry Rothwell
Trustees' Award
Recipient — Paul Watson

=== 2006 winners ===
The award for Best Documentary Series was reinstated after being dropped the previous year.

Hosted by Rageh Omaar: 17 November 2006 at The Royal Geographical Society, London
Best Documentary on a Contemporary Issue	Best Historical Documentary	Best Documentary Series
Winner — Asylum: (BBC Four). dir: Peter Gordon	Winner — How Vietnam Was Lost - Two Days in October: (BBC One). dir. Robert Kenner	Winner —Russian Godfathers (BBC Two). dir. Patrick Forbes
Best Newcomer Award	Best Documentary on the Arts	Best Drama Documentary
Winner — Disabled and Looking For Love, (BBC Three). dir. Clare Richards	Winner — Take That: For The Record (ITV1). dir. David Notman-Watt	Winner — The Year London Blew Up (Channel 4). dir. Edmund Coulthard
Most Entertaining Documentary	Best Documentary on Science or the Natural World	Best Cinema Documentary
Winner — Ramsay's Kitchen Nightmares - Episode:"Momma Cherri's" (Channel 4). dir. Christine Hall	Winner — The Natural World - Episode: "The Queen of Trees" (BBC Two). dir. Victoria Stone / Mark Deeble	Winner — Storyville: Darwin's Nightmare, dir. Hubert Sauper
Trustees' Award
Recipient — Mike Salisbury

=== 2005 winners ===
This year saw the award for Best International Documentary and Best Cinema Documentary combined into a new Best International Cinema Documentary award. The Best Documentary Series award was replaced with a new award for Best Drama Documentary.

Hosted by Michael Portillo: 27 November 2005 at the Royal Institution, London
Best Documentary on a Contemporary Issue	Best Historical Documentary	Best Drama Documentary
Winner — Sisters in Law (Channel 4). dir. Kim Longinotto / Florence Ayisi	Winner — Auschwitz: The Nazis & The 'Final Solution' - Episode 1 "Surprising Beginnings" (BBC Two). dir. Detlef Siebert, Dominic Sutherland & Laurence Rees	Winner — Cherished. (BBC One). dir. Robin Sheppard
Best Newcomer Award	Best Documentary on the Arts	Best International Cinema Documentary
Winner — Send Me Somewhere Special: (BBC Three). dir. Darren Hercher	Winner — The South Bank Show - Episode: "Robert Frank" (ITV). dir. Gerald Fox	Winner — My Architect. dir. Nathaniel Kahn
Most Entertaining Documentary	Best Documentary on Science or the Natural World	Trustees' Award
Winner — Bye Bye Happiness (BBC Three). dir. Oli Barry	Winner — The Natural World - Episode: "Mississippi, Tales of the Last River Rat". (BBC Two). dir. Andrew Graham Brown	Recipient — Nick Fraser

=== 2004 winners ===
The eligibility window was for documentaries first screened in the UK between 1 May 2003 and 30 April 2004.

Hosted by Ian Hislop: 8 November 2004 at Bloomberg's London headquarters
Best Documentary on a Contemporary Issue	Best Historical Documentary	Best Documentary Series
Winner — Terror in Moscow: (Channel 4). dir. Dan Reed	Winner — Dunkirk: The Soldiers' Story. (BBC Two). dir. Peter Gordon	Winner — National Trust. (BBC Four). dir. Patrick Forbes
Best Newcomer Award	Best Documentary on the Arts	Best International Documentary
Winner — The Boy Whose Skin Fell Off (Channel 4). dir. Patrick Collerton	Winner — George Orwell: A Life in Pictures (BBC Two). dir. Chris Durlacher	Winner — To Live is Better Than To Die (BBC Four Storyville). dir. Weijun Chen
Most Entertaining Documentary	Best Documentary on Science or the Natural World	Best Cinema Documentary
Winner — The Prince, The Showgirl and Me. (BBC Four). dir. Clare Beavan	Winner — Horizon: "Project Poltergeist". (BBC Two). dir. David Sington	Winner — Capturing The Friedmans, dir. Andrew Jarecki
Trustees' Award
Recipient — Jonathan Gili (awarded posthumously)

=== 2003 winners ===
New categories of Best Documentary on Science or the Natural World and Best Cinema Documentary were introduced this year. Also any entry which was substantially produced on photographic film was also considered for the Best Documentary on Film award. The Lifetime Achievement Award was renamed back to the Trustees' Award. All entries were required to have had a public screening or broadcast in the UK between 1 May 2002 and 30 April 2003.

Hosted by Ester Rantzen: 17 November 2003 at City Hall on London's South Bank
Best Documentary on a Contemporary Issue	Best Historical Documentary	Best Documentary Series
Winner — Crackhouse: (BBC Two). dir. Laurence Turnbull, Carl John & Martin Fuller	Winner — SAS Embassy Siege: (BBC Two). dir. Bruce Goodison	Winner — The Last Peasants: (Channel 4). dir. Angus Macqueen
Best Newcomer Award	Best Documentary on the Arts	Best International Documentary
Winner — Chavez, Inside the Coup (BBC Four). dir. Donnacha Ó Briain / Kim Bartley	Winner — Antoni Gaudi, God's Architect: (BBC Four). dir. Mandy Chang	Winner — Chavez, Inside the Coup (BBC Four). dir. Donnacha Ó Briain / Kim Bartley
Most Entertaining Documentary	Best Documentary on Science or the Natural World	Best Cinema Documentary
'Winner —Jamie's Kitchen": (Channel 4). dir. Sandi Scott	Winner — DNA, The Future: (Channel 4). dir. David Glover	Winner — Biggie & Tupac: dir. Nick Broomfield
Best Documentary on Film	Trustees' Award	
Winner — The Last Peasants: (Channel 4). dir. Angus Macqueen; Winner — Prisoner of Paradise, dir. Malcolm Clarke / Stuart Sender	Recipient — Molly Dineen	

=== 2002 winners ===
Once again the awards were expanded. New categories of Best Documentary on the Arts, Most Entertaining Documentary and International Documentary were added. The eligibility window was for documentaries first screened publicly between 1 May 2001 to 30 April 2002.

Hosted by Michael Palin: 12 November 2002 at BAFTA, London
Best Documentary on a Contemporary Issue	Best Historical Documentary	Best Documentary Series
Winner — Kelly and her Sisters (ITV1). dir. Marilyn Gaunt	Winner — Ceausescu: The King of Communism (BBC Four). dir. Ben Lewis	Winner — The Trust: (Channel 4). dir. Jenny Crowther / Jonathan Smith
Best Newcomer Award	Best Documentary on the Arts	Best International Documentary
Winner — Lift (Channel 4). dir. Marc Isaccs; Winner — News Time: This is Palestine: (BBC Four Storyville). dir. Azza El-Hassan	Winner — Omnibus: David Hockney's Secret Knowledge (ITV1). dir. Randall Wright	Winner — Southern Comfort (BBC Four). dir. Kate Davis
Most Entertaining Documentary	Lifetime Achievement Award	
Winner — Faking It: "Burger Man to Chef" (Channel 4). dir. Jamie Simpson	Recipient — Sir David Attenborough	

=== 2000 / 2001 winners ===
In 2000, with support from the UK Film Council the awards were expanded to four categories and the Trustees' Award renamed to the Lifetime Achievement Award. The best documentary selected from these four category winners went on to win the overall Premier Grierson Award. The eligibility window was for documentaries first screened publicly between 1 January 2000 and 30 April 2001.

Hosted by Sir David Frost: 14 November 2001 at BAFTA, London
Premier Grierson Award	Best Documentary on a Contemporary Issue	Best Historical Documentary
Winner — Correspondent: "Killers Don't Cry" (BBC). dir. Clifford Bestall	Winner — Correspondent: "Killers Don't Cry": (BBC). dir. Clifford Bestall	Winner — Britain at War in Colour: "Darkest Hour" (ITV1). dir. Lucy Carter / Stewart Binns
Best Documentary Series	Best Newcomer Award	Lifetime Achievement Award
Winner — Indian Journeys (BBC). dir. Hugh Thomson	Winner — Fifteen: (Channel 4). dir. Daisy Asquith; Winner — The Alcohol Years (Channel 4). dir. Carol Morley	Recipient — Alan Whicker; Recipient — Desmond Wilcox (posthumously awarded)

== 1972–1999 winners ==
From 1972 to 1999, there was a single award for Best British Documentary. In 1998 an honorary Trustees' Award was introduced. The 1999 winners' ceremony was held at The Savoy Hotel in London on 23 March 2000 with Andrew Neil as guest speaker.

=== 1990s ===
- 1999: Gulag: Enemy of the People (dir. Angus Macqueen / BBC Two) and Trustees' Award to David Munro and Philip Donnallen
- 1998: Inside Story: Tongue Tied (dir. Olivia Lichtenstein / BBC One) and Trustees' Award to Michael Apted
- 1997: The System: The Nature of the Beast (dir. Peter Dale / BBC Two)
- 1996: Man and Animal (dir. Antony Thomas / Carlton TV)
- 1995: Tripping with Zhirinovsky (dir. Paweł Pawlikowski / BBC)
- 1994: Beyond the Clouds (dir. Phil Agland / Channel 4)
- 1993: Aileen Wuornos: The Selling of a Serial Killer (dir. Nick Broomfield / Lafayette Films)
- 1992: Children of Chernobyl (dir. Clive Gordon / Yorkshire Television)
- 1991: Absurdistan (dir. John Whiston / BBC)
- 1990: Four Hours in My Lai (dir. Kevin Sim / Yorkshire Television)

=== 1980s ===
- 1989: Concerning Cancer: The Enemy Within (dir. David Hutt / Channel 4)
- 1988: Fourteen Days in May (dir. Paul Hamann / BBC)
- 1987: Handsworth Songs (dir. John Akomfrah / Black Audio Film Collective)
- 1986: From the Cradle to the Grave (dir. John Willis / Yorkshire Television)
- 1985: Miners Campaign Tapes (Platform Films / National Union of Mineworkers)
- 1984: Framed Youth (London Lesbian and Gay Youth Video Project / GLAA)
- 1983: Give Us This Day (dir. Phil Mulloy / Arts Council of Great Britain)
- 1981/1982: Rough Cut and Ready Dubbed (dir. Hasan Shah / BFI & GLAA)
- 1980: Jozef (dir. Jerzy Kaszubowski / National Film School) and The Tom Machine (dir. Paul Bamborough / National Film School)

=== 1970s ===
- 1979: Fred Dibnah: Steeplejack (dir. Don Haworth / BBC Television)
- 1978: Begging the Ring (dir. Colin Gregg / Dartington Arts Society)
- 1977: Tom Phillips (dir. David Rowan / Arts Council of Great Britain)
- 1976: Devices and Desires (dir. Giles Foster / Ken McMullen Productions)
- 1975: Drive Carefully Darling (dir. John Krish / Department of Environment)
- 1974: Butterfly Ball (dir. Lee Mishkin / Halas and Batchelor)
- 1973: Like Other People (dir. Paul Morrison / Spastics Society & Mental Health)
- 1972: The Wind in the Wires (dir. John Edwards / Buff Films / Rothmans). - first year of bust as trophy.
- 1971: A Future for the Past (Peter Bradford / Civic Trust). - as winner of the BFFS Short Film Award.

== Grierson Award at the BFI London Film Festival ==
Since 2005 an award has been given to the best documentary shown at the annual BFI London Film Festival. The awards from 2005 to 2016 were featured on the Trust's previous website, however it is unclear if the Trust has had any input into the selection of the winner since 2017. The winners are:

- 2005: Workingman's Death, dir. Michael Glawogger.
- 2006: Thin, dir. Lauren Greenfield.
- 2007: The Mosquito Problem and Other Stories, dir. Andrey Paounov.
- 2008: Victoire Terminus, dir. Florent de la Tullaye and Renaud Barret.
- 2009: Defamation, dir. Yoav Shamir.
- 2010: Armadillo, dir. Janus Metz.
- 2011: Into the Abyss: A Tale of Death, A Tale of Life, dir. Werner Herzog.
- 2012: Mea Maxima Culpa: Silence in the House of God, dir. Alex Gibney.
- 2013: My Fathers, My Mother and Me, dir. Paul-Julien Robert.
- 2014: Silvered Water, Syria Self-Portrait, dir. Ossama Mohammed and Wiam Simav Bedirxan.
- 2015: Sherpa, dir. Jennifer Peedom.
- 2016: Starless Dreams, dir. Mehrdad Oskouei.
- 2017: Kingdom of Us, dir. Lucy Cohen.
- 2018: What You Gonna Do When the World's on Fire?, dir. Roberto Minervini.
- 2019: White Riot, dir. Rubika Shah.
- 2020: The Painter and the Thief, dir. Benjamin Ree.
- 2021: Becoming Cousteau, dir. Liz Garbus.
- 2022: All That Breathes, dir. Shaunak Sen.
- 2023: Bye Bye Tiberias, dir. Lina Soualem.
- 2024: Mother Vera, dir. Cécile Embleton & Alys Tomlinson
- 2025: The Travellers, dir. David Bingong
- 2026: Concrete Land, by Asmahan Bkerat

== Grierson: Sheffields ==
During the tenure of Jenny Barraclough as Trust chair, The Grierson Trust working in conjunction with Sheffield DocFest launched Grierson: Sheffields. Three awards were sponsored by the Trust: The Green Award, which recognised documentaries exploring environmental issues or that had made a contribution to the climate change debate; The Innovation Award, for documentaries that exhibited innovation in format, style, technique or content and The Youth Jury Award. The Youth Jury was a panel of 16- to 21-year-olds that were selected by Channel 4 and 4Talent. After 2009, the awards continued to be bestowed but no longer had any association with The Grierson Trust.

=== 2007 (inaugural Grierson: Sheffields) ===
- The Green Award: An Inconvenient Truth, dir. Davis Guggenheim.
- The Innovation Award: Talk To Me , dir. Mark Craig.
- The Youth Jury Award: We Are Together, dir. Paul Taylor. Commended: Baghdad High.

=== 2008 (2nd Grierson: Sheffields) ===
- The Green Award: The Age of Stupid, dir. Franny Armstrong.
- The Innovation Award: Seven Sins of England, dir. Joseph Bullman.
- The Youth Jury Award: The Order of Myths, dir. Margaret Brown.

=== 2009 (3rd Grierson: Sheffields) ===
- The Green Award: The Blood of the Rose, dir. Henry Singer.
- The Innovation Award: LoopLoop, dir. Patrick Bergeron. Commended: The Big Issue. dir. Samuel Bollendorff, Olivia Colo.
- The Youth Jury Award: Sons of Cuba, dir. Andrew Lang.
