= The Why Foundation =

Danish nonprofit organization

The Why Foundation is a nonprofit organization based in Copenhagen that produces and distributes social justice–oriented documentary films world-wide. It was founded the name Steps International by Nick Fraser and Mette Hoffmann Meyer in 2004 and renamed in 2014.

The foundation expresses commitment to free access to information, providing free online screening on their website and on YouTube, as well as partnering with TV stations across the world for Public-access television. The foundation also organizes screenings for schoolkids around the world, showing its films dubbed or subtitled in local languages.

From 2004 the foundation was headed by CEO Don Edkins, he was succeeded by Danish documentary filmmaker Christoffer Guldbrandsen in 2014. The current CEO is Mette Hoffmann Meyer.

In 2013 the foundation won a Peabody award, under its former name, Steps International, for its series Why Poverty?

In 2018 the foundation released its fourth documentary series called Why Slavery?, documenting various forms of modern slavery in six films. The series reached 191 countries through 70 TV stations, including BBC and BBC World News.

== Films ==
The Why Foundation has produced the following documentary series:

- Why Democracy?
  - Bloody Cartoons (2007)
  - For God, the Tsar and the Fatherland (2007)
  - Egypt: We are Watching You (2007)
  - Looking for the Revolution (2007)
  - In Search of Gandhi (2007)
  - Iron Ladies of Liberia (2007)
  - Please Vote for Me (2007)
  - Taxi to the Dark Side (2007)
  - Campaign! The Kawasaki Candidate (2007)
  - Dinner With the President (2007)
- Why Poverty?
  - Education, Education (2012)
  - Give Us the Money (2012)
  - Land Rush (2012)
  - Park Avenue: Money, Power and the American Dream (2012)
  - Poor Us: An Animated History of Poverty (2012)
  - Rafea: Solar Mama (2012)
  - Stealing Africa (2012)
  - Welcome to the World (2012)
- Why Women?
  - The Secret Slaves of the Middle East (2016)
  - State of Women (2016)
  - Crown Princess Mary's Mission (2016)
- Why Slavery?
  - A Woman Captured (2017)
  - North Korea's Secret Slaves: Dollar Heroes (2018)
  - Maid In Hell (2018)
  - I Was a Yazidi Slave (2018)
  - Selling Children (2018)
  - Jailed in America (2018)
- Why Plastic?
  - The Recycling Myth (2022)
  - We the Guinea Pigs (2021)
  - Coca-Cola's Plastic Promises (2021)
