= Don Edkins =

- Born: 1953 (age 72–73); Cape town
- Citizenship: South Africa
- Occupations: documentary filmmaker and producer
- Awards: Grierson Awards

Don Edkins is an international documentary filmmaker and producer. He was born in Cape Town in 1953. At the age of twenty-two he left South Africa for political reasons, and returned in 1994 to take part in his country’s first democratic elections.

He produced the Southern African series on truth and reconciliation Landscape of Memory (1998), and the multi-awarded documentary project Steps for the Future (2001/04) – a collection of 38 films about Southern Africa in the time of HIV and AIDS. He is Executive Producer of the STEPS International global documentary project Why Democracy? 10 long and 18 short films. He is Executive Producer on the STEPS International global documentary project Why Poverty? He is producing Dare to Dream and the AfriDocs initiative. In April 2014, he started AfriDocs, the first weekly primetime documentary strand across sub-Saharan Africa, that screens the best African and international documentary films twice a week, as well as special focus events on relevant issues facing African audiences.

In 2026, Edkins produced the documentary short film An Open Field, directed by his son Teboho. The film follows an Orthodox Tewahedo community living at the crash site of Ethiopian Airlines Flight 302, in which Edkins' other son Max was killed.

== He is producer for ==
2001 Steps for the Future (TV Series documentary) (series producer - 3 episodes)

- Wa 'n Wina (2001) ... (series producer)
- Mother to Child (2001) ... (series producer)
- Body & Soul (2001) ... (series producer)

2002 Ho ea rona (Documentary short) (producer)

2004 Ask Me I'm Positive (Documentary) (producer)

2004 Story of a Beautiful Country (Documentary) (producer)

2007 The Mohammed Cartoons (TV Movie documentary) (executive producer)

2007 Please Vote for Me (Documentary) (producer)

2007 Taxi to the Dark Side (Documentary) (executive producer: Steps International)

2007 Kinshasa 2.0 (TV Short documentary) (producer)

2010 Last White Man Standing (producer)

2011 Thato (Documentary short) (executive producer) / (producer)

2011 Mama Africa (Documentary) (producer)

2012 Land Rush (Documentary) (executive producer)

2012 Education Education (Documentary) (executive producer) / (producer)

Independent Lens (TV Series documentary) (executive producer - 5 episodes, 2007 - 2012) (producer - 1 episode, 2007)

- Park Avenue: Money, Power & the American Dream (2012) ... (executive producer)
- Solar Mamas (2012) ... (executive producer)
- Dinner with the President: A Nation's Journey (2008) ... (executive producer)
- Iron Ladies of Liberia (2008) ... (executive producer)
- Please Vote for Me (2007) ... (executive producer) / (producer)

2012 Poop on Poverty (Documentary short) (executive producer)

2012 Rafea: Solar Mama (Documentary) (executive producer)

2013 Gangster Backstage (Documentary short) (producer)

2016 Coming of Age (Documentary) (executive producer) / (producer)

== Awards ==
Grierson Awards - 2008 Award for Most Entertaining Documentary
