= Taxi to the Dark Side =

2007 documentary film by Alex Gibney

- Theatrical release poster
- Directed by: Alex Gibney
- Written by: Alex Gibney
- Produced by: Alex Gibney; Eva Orner; Susannah Shipman
- Edited by: Sloane Klevin
- Music by: Ivor Guest; Robert Logan
- Distributed by: THINKFilm
- Release date: April 30, 2007
- Running time: 106 minutes
- Country: United States
- Language: English

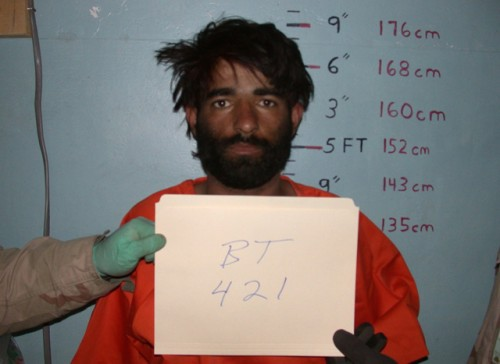
Mugshot of taxi driver Dilawar at the Bagram prison where he died

Taxi to the Dark Side is a 2007 American documentary film directed by Alex Gibney, and produced by Gibney, Eva Orner, and Susannah Shipman. It won the 2007 Academy Award for Best Documentary Feature. It focuses on the December 2002 killing of an Afghan taxi driver named Dilawar, who was beaten to death by American soldiers while being held in extrajudicial detention and interrogated at a black site at Bagram air base.

It was part of the Why Democracy? documentary film series produced by The Why Foundation. The series consisted of ten documentary films from around the world questioning and examining contemporary democracy. As part of this series, the documentary was broadcast in over 30 countries from October 8–18, 2007. The BBC showed the film in its Storyville series.

== Overview ==
Taxi to the Dark Side examines US policy on torture and interrogation, specifically the CIA's use of torture and their research into sensory deprivation. The film includes discussions against the use of torture by political and military opponents, as well as the defense of such methods; attempts by Congress to uphold the standards of the Geneva Convention forbidding torture; and popularization of the use of torture techniques in TV shows such as 24.

== Plot ==
The documentary concerns the death of Dilawar, an Afghan peanut farmer, who gave up farming to become a taxi driver and who died after several days of beating at Bagram detention center.

Dilawar left his home of Yakubi in eastern Afghanistan in the autumn of 2002, investing his family money in a new taxi to make money in a larger city. On 1 December 2002 he and three passengers were handed over to US military officials by a local Afghan warlord, accused of organising an attack on Camp Salerno. The warlord was later found guilty of the attack himself, but had been ingratiating himself (for $1000 per person) by handing over alleged terrorists.

Dilawar was held at the prison at Bagram Air Base, and given the prisoner number BT421. Chained from the ceiling, he received multiple attacks on his thighs, a standard technique viewed as "permissible" and non-life-threatening. It is likely that the severe attack caused a blood clot which then killed him. His official death certificate created by the US military to pass to his family, with his body, was marked "homicide". Medical conclusion stated that Dilawar's legs were "pulpified" and, had he lived, would have required amputation.

The film explores the background of increasingly sanctioned torture following 9/11 in contravention of the Geneva Convention and looks at the exposure of Abu Ghraib.

Interviews include Tim Golden of The New York Times who brought the case into the international spotlight, and Moazzam Begg, a British citizen imprisoned at the same time, and witness to the events. Military interviewees include Damien Corsetti the main interrogator, and Sgt. Anthony Morden. Cpt Christopher Beiring explains how he was the only person charged (charged with dereliction of duty).

The documentary claims that of the over 83,000 people incarcerated by US forces in Afghanistan up to 2007, 93 percent were captured by local militiamen and exchanged for US bounty payments. Also that 105 detainees had died in captivity and that 37 of these deaths had been officially classified as homicides up to 2007.

The film also looks at Guantánamo Bay and how the same techniques were implemented there.

== Release ==
The film premiered at the Tribeca Film Festival in New York City on April 28, 2007.

== Reception ==
=== Critical response ===
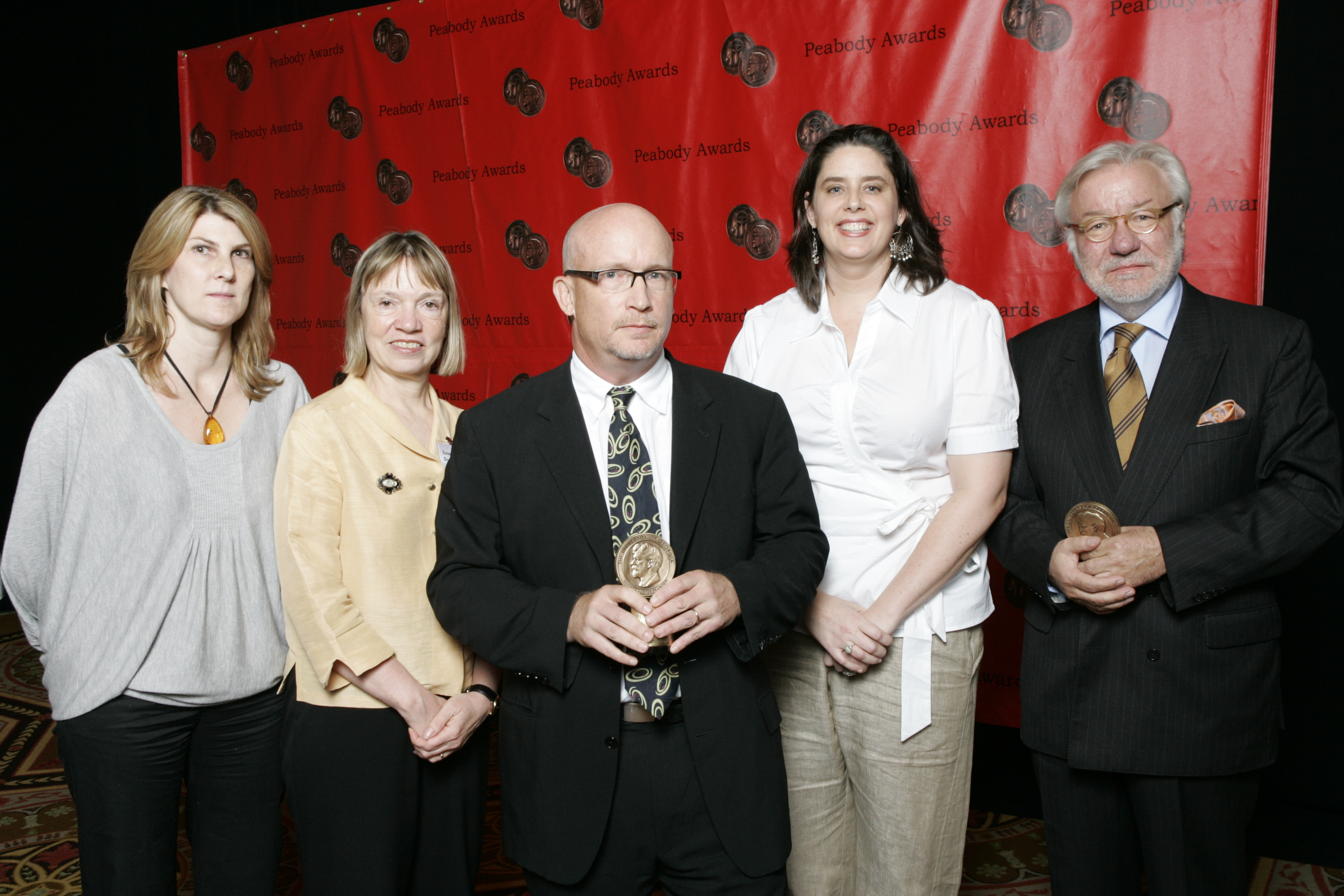
Alex Gibney and the crew of Taxi to the Dark Side at the 67th Annual Peabody Awards

Taxi to the Dark Side appeared on some critics' top ten lists of the best films of 2008. Premiere magazine named it the fifth best film of 2008, and Bill White of the Seattle Post-Intelligencer named it the seventh-best film of 2008. The film also scored 100% for critic approval, out of 93 reviews on Rotten Tomatoes, with a weighted average of 8.34/10. The site's consensus reads: "Taxi to the Dark Side is an intelligent, powerful look into the dark corners of the War on Terror". It also has a score of 82 out of 100 on Metacritic, based on 25 critics, indicating "universal acclaim".

=== Awards ===
The film was named by the Academy of Motion Picture Arts and Sciences as one of 15 films on its documentary feature Oscar shortlist in November 2007, and won the Oscar on February 24, 2008. In his acceptance speech for the "Best Documentary Feature" Academy Award, Gibney said:

This is dedicated to two people who are no longer with us, Dilawar, the young Afghan taxi driver, and my father, a navy interrogator who urged me to make this film because of his fury about what was being done to the rule of law. Let's hope we can turn this country around, move away from the dark side and back to the light.

It also won a Peabody Award in 2007 "for its sober, meticulous argument that what happened to a hapless Afghani was not an aberration but, rather, the inevitable result of a consciously approved, widespread policy." Additionally, Gibney received the Writers Guild of America Award for Best Documentary Screenplay at the 60th Writers Guild of America Awards.

== Censorship allegations and legal disputes ==
In June 2007, the Discovery Channel bought the rights to broadcast Taxi to the Dark Side. However, in February 2008, it made public its intention never to broadcast the documentary due to its "controversial" nature and was accused of censorship. HBO then bought pay to view rights to the film and broadcast it in September 2008, after which the Discovery Channel announced it would broadcast Taxi to the Dark Side in 2009.

In June 2008, Gibney's company filed for arbitration, arguing that THINKFilm failed to properly distribute and promote the film following its release and Oscar win.

== See also ==
- Standard Operating Procedure (2008 film)
- Torturing Democracy (2008 film)
- Jan Baz
- Mohammed al-Qahtani – Guantanamo detainee discussed in the film
- Ibn al-Shaykh al-Libi
- Abu Ghraib torture and prisoner abuse
- Extraordinary rendition by the United States
- Christopher Beiring
- Canadian Afghan detainee abuse scandal
- Bagram torture and prisoner abuse
- List of films with a 100% rating on Rotten Tomatoes, a film review aggregator website
