= Parkhudin =

Afghan Guantanamo detainee

- Born: 1977 (age 48–49)
- Arrested: 2002
- Released: March 2004
- Citizenship: Afghanistan
- Detained at: BTIF, Guantanamo
- Other name: Bar Far Huddine
- Charge: none
- Status: repatriated
- Occupation: farmer

Parkhudin is a citizen of Afghanistan who was held in extrajudicial detention in the Bagram Collection Point and in the United States Guantanamo Bay detainment camps in Cuba. His Guantanamo Internment Serial Number was 896. First detained at Bagram prison in 2002 and transferred to Guantanamo in 2003, he was finally released in 2004.

Tim Golden, of the New York Times, interviewed Parkhudin when he broke the story of two other Afghan citizens, Habibullah and Dilawar, who died under torture at Bagram prison in 2005.

== Abduction ==
In 2002, Parkhudin, a 26-year-old farmer, was a passenger in Dilawar's jitney taxi along with two other men, Abdur Rahim, and Zakim Shah. All four men were taken captive by Jan Baz Khan, an Afghan militia leader who had a contract to provide security for Forward Operating Base Salerno. Jan Baz Khan told his American contacts that the four men were responsible for firing missiles at the base and he handed them over to the Americans in early December 2002. The men spent their first days in captivity with their hands shackled to the ceiling, suspended in a "stress position". Their heads were covered by a hood, and they were often beaten. Less than a week after their arrival, the taxi driver, Dilawar, died under this torture. Parkhudin, Abdur Rahim and Zakim Shah survived. Parkhudin was transferred to Guantanamo on 7 February 2003.

== Release ==
Golden reported that by January 2003, less than two months after coming into American captivity, American intelligence analysts concluded that Dilawar and his three passengers were in fact innocent victims of Jan Baz Khan and that the militia fired the missiles themselves. However, it was not until March 2004 that Parkhudin and the others were finally released. Golden reported that, upon their return to Afghanistan, the three men were unable to tell Dilawar's family of how much he had suffered in US captivity.

== See also ==
- Bagram torture and prisoner abuse
