= When the Moors Ruled in Europe =

When The Moors Ruled In Europe
- Directed by: Timothy Copestake
- Produced by: Rowan Deacon
- Release date: 2005
- Country: United Kingdom
- Language: English

When The Moors Ruled In Europe is a documentary film presented by the English historian Bettany Hughes. It is a two-part series on the contribution the Moors made to Europe during their 700-year reign in Spain and Portugal ending in the 15th century. It was first broadcast on Channel 4 Saturday 5 November 2005, and was filmed in the Spanish region of Andalusia, mostly in the cities of Granada, Cordoba and the Moroccan city of Fes.

The era ended with the Reconquista during which the Catholic authorities burnt over 1,000,000 Arabic texts.

== See also ==
- List of Islamic films
