= Rowan Deacon =

English director and filmmaker

- Born: 1976 or 1977 (age 48–49)
- Occupations: Director and filmmaker

Rowan Deacon (born 1976 or 1977) is an English director and filmmaker.

== Career ==
Deacon is from Leeds, England. She became involved in the industry in 2000. She produced Namesakes A Very British Odyssey in 2004 and When the Moors Ruled in Europe in 2005. She directed and produced Health Food Junkies in 2008, Tulisa My Mum and Me in 2010, 2012 episodes of The Tube, Keeping Britain Alive: the NHS in a Day in 2013, Our War: Goodbye Afghanistan in 2014 and How to Die: Simon's Choice in 2016. She was also a researcher and assistant producer on The Naked Chef and she was involved with the documentary Our War. Her first hour long film was The History of Islam. In 2008 she directed a documentary about the models who pose as celebrity's body doubles. The documentary Our War: Goodbye Afghanistan won the 2015 Grierson Award for Best Documentary on Current Affairs.

She directed the Netflix documentary Jimmy Savile: A British Horror Story which was about the Jimmy Savile sexual abuse scandal and was released in April 2022.
