= Killing of Dilawar =

Afghan torture victim

Dilawar
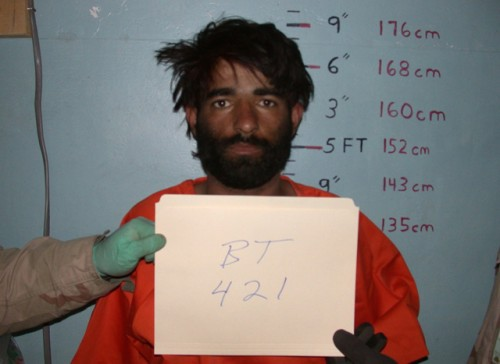
- Dilawar's mugshot
- Born: c. 1979; Pakistan
- Died: 10 December 2002 (aged 22); Parwan Detention Facility, Afghanistan
- Cause of death: Tortured to death
- Occupations: Taxi driver and farmer

Dilawar (Pashto: دلاور; born c. 1979 – 10 December 2002), also known as Dilawar of Yakubi, was an Afghan farmer and taxi driver who was tortured to death by US Army soldiers at the Parwan Detention Facility, which was at the time a US military detention center referred to as the “Parwan Collection Point,” in Afghanistan.

He arrived at the prison on 5 December 2002, and was declared dead five days later. His death was declared a homicide and was the subject of a major investigation by the US Army of abuses at the prison. It was prosecuted in the Bagram torture and prisoner abuse trials and no one was found guilty. The Academy award-winning documentary Taxi to the Dark Side (2007) focuses on the killing of Dilawar.

== Background ==
Dilawar was born to a Pashtun family native to Yakubi in the Khost Province of Afghanistan. Dilawar and his nine siblings were born in nearby Pakistan, where his parents had fled due to the Soviet–Afghan War. They earned a living through manual labor, with Dilawar's eldest brother Shapoor sending back money he earned as a migrant worker in Dubai's taxi and hotel industry. The family returned to Khost in 1996 following the establishment of the first Islamic Emirate of Afghanistan, purchasing a plot of land in Yakubi to grow corn, grain and peanuts. At age 17, Dilawar married in Khost and had a daughter. He subsequently worked as a goat shepherd for the livestock trading business of his brother Shapoor during the day and during the evenings, he collected rock from the nearby mountains to sell as building material.

Standing at 5 ft 9 in (1.75 m) and weighing 122 pounds (55 kg), Dilawar was noted as having a weak physical constitution and did not leave the vicinity of his home since he was unable to grow a full beard in accordance with Taliban rules. In late 2002, Dilawar received a Toyota Corolla as a belated wedding gift from his brother Shapoor, who hoped that this would help Dilawar pursue less strenuous work. Dilawar had been a taxi driver for only a few weeks before his death.

== Arrest ==
On 1 December 2002, on Eid al-Fitr, Dilawar set off from Yakubi in his taxi. His mother had asked Dilawar to bring his three sisters back for a family dinner from their husbands' homes in nearby villages. As the car did not have enough fuel, Dilawar first set out for Khost city to earn a taxi fare to refill his gas tank. In Khost, Dilawar picked up three passengers: laborer Parkhudin, farmer Zakim Khan and baker Abdul Rahim, who were headed for Yakubi to join their families for Eid al-Fitr.

Around 15 minutes into their 45 minute drive, the taxi passed by Camp Salerno, which had been targeted by a rocket strike earlier in the morning. A few minutes later, the taxi was stopped at gunpoint on a desert road by guerrilla militiamen under the leadership of Jan Baz Khan. After forcing the occupants out of the car, the militia group searched the vehicle, recovering an electric stabilizer from the trunk. According to Dilawar's family, the stabilizer did not belong to them since they had no electricity at their home. The militiamen were unfamiliar with the electrical device and believed it was related to the earlier rocket attack on the American camp. A search of Parkhudin yielded phone numbers from his employment in Dubai and Pakistan, as well as a broken walkie-talkie, which Parkhudin said was related to his association with U.S. forces, though he did not carry documents relating to this on his person at the time. The four men were detained as potential al-Qaeda associates and named as suspects in the rocket attack on Camp Salerno. It was later found that Jan Baz Khan may have staged the Camp Salerno attack and ordered the arrest of uninvolved citizens to gain favor and financial compensation from the American military.

Shapoor was told of his brother's disappearance shortly after by another taxi driver, who had driven by the scene and witnessed Dilawar and his passengers being arrested by militia forces, who smashed the windows of his taxi before leaving. He learnt from locals that Dilawar was likely arrested as a suspect in the Camp Salerno attack. Shapoor spent the following days pleading with Camp Salerno guards, the governor's office and other officials for Dilawar's release. They all demanded bribes for information or promises of his release, with Shapoor spending 800,000 Pakistani rupees (equivalent to US$13,323). In the end, Shapoor had to sell Dilawar's taxi for the equivalent of $1,000 to pay for his brother's funeral expenses.

== Internment ==
Dilawar and the three passengers were loaded into a truck by the milita and first driven to Camp Salerno. U.S. troops took custody of the four men and ordered them to lie down near a chain-link fence outside as armed soldiers came out of the base to restrain their wrists and ankles with plastic handcuffs. They were left in this position for several hours, with some soldiers throwing rocks at them and laughing. After spending a night outside, tied-up and unable to sleep, a doctor examined Dilawar and reported that he was tired and suffering from headaches, but otherwise healthy.

Between 1 and 5 December 2002, the four detainees were flown to Bagram Theater Internment Facility, spending the four-day duration restrained and in hooding. After a medical check-up, the men were ordered to dress in orange prison jumpsuits and forced into a chain-link fence holding cell, containing ten to fifteen other people. Guards ordered the prisoners not to speak to each other and not look at U.S. soldiers under threat of multiple-hour disciplinary punishment. Passenger Parkhudin recalled that Dilawar had been visibly terrified since his arrest and remained so as he witnessed the punishment of other detainees, which included "forced standing" in a stress position and forced staring into flashlights. Eventually, each prisoner was assigned a small cell, designed so that the occupant could neither fully stand up or lie down.

=== Torture ===
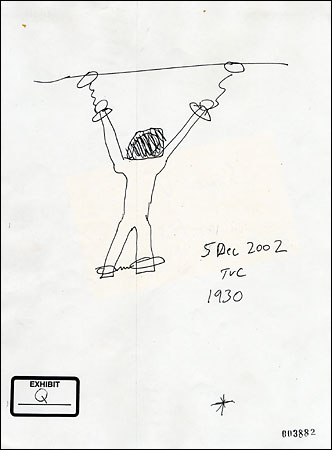
A sketch by Thomas V. Curtis, a former Reserve M.P. sergeant, showing how Dilawar was chained to the ceiling of his cell

Like other prisoners, Dilawar was forced into a daily schedule of torture by guards, both in-between and during interrogation. The lights were permanently on in the cell block. The various accounts of torture Dilawar suffered have been detailed as follows:

- A black hood pulled over his head limiting his ability to breathe
- Knee strikes to the abdomen
- Over 100 peroneal strikes (a nerve behind the kneecap)
- Shoved against a wall
- Pulled by his beard
- His bare feet stepped on
- Kicks to the groin
- Chained to the ceiling for extended hours, depriving him of sleep
- Slammed his chest into a table front

On his first day at Bagram, Dilawar was awoken by being splashed with cold water, with the ventilation turned on to let frigid air in from outside to induce a stronger freezing sensation. He and other prisoners were then chained to the ceiling of his cell, and suspended by his wrists, and only periodically released from this position for interrogation. His arms became dislocated from their sockets, and flapped around limply whenever guards lowered him from the ceiling. During questioning, U.S. troops used Arabic translators, who did not understand Pashto, while Afghan staff had difficulty comprehending Dilawar's particular dialect.

According to Parkhudin, questions revolved around the electric stabilizer found in the taxi, its supposed connection to the Camp Salerno attack, and how often they had met Osama bin Laden. Parkhudin overheard Dilawar telling his captors in his first interrogation that he did not know his passengers and was only a taxi driver.

Whenever Dilawar was beaten, he would cry for his mother. Dilawar would repeatedly ask "Where are you my God?", which was always followed by laughter from the soldiers. During his detention, Dilawar's legs were beaten to a pulp. They would have had to have been amputated because damage was so severe.

On 10 December 2002, at around 2:00 a.m., a final interrogation of Dilawar was headed by two U.S. soldiers. When Dilawar asked for something to drink at the beginning of the interrogation, one of the interrogators, 21-year-old Specialist Joshua R. Claus, gave him a bottle of water with a punctured bottom. After Dilawar's clothes were wet, Claus grabbed the bottle and sprayed Dilawar in the face while commanding him to drink. Claus ordered a guard to force Dilawar into a kneeling position, but Dilawar's legs were no longer able to bend. Claus ended the interrogation early and told guards to chain Dilawar to the ceiling again, telling the detainee that a doctor would eventually check on him. Dilawar subsequently died in his cell. According to Parkhudin, Dilawar's last words were "Oh, my mother. Oh my God. I'm about to die". He is survived by his wife and their then five-year-old daughter, Bibi Rashida.

In March 2004, Dilawar's passengers, Parkhudin, Zakim Khan and Abdul Rahim, who had all experienced similar mistreatment, were flown to the Guantanamo Bay detention camps at the US base in Cuba. Parkhudin and Zakim Khan were released in 2005 after nearly a year of imprisonment when their charges were dismissed.

The New York Times reported that:

On the day of his death, Dilawar had been chained by the wrists to the top of his cell for much of the previous four days. A guard tried to force the young man to his knees. But his legs, which had been pummeled by guards for several days, could no longer bend. An interrogator told Mr. Dilawar that he could see a doctor after they finished with him. When he was finally sent back to his cell, though, the guards were instructed only to chain the prisoner back to the ceiling. "Leave him up," one of the guards quoted Specialist Claus as saying. Several hours passed before an emergency room doctor finally saw Mr. Dilawar. By then he was dead, his body beginning to stiffen. It would be many months before Army investigators learned that most of the interrogators had in fact believed Mr. Dilawar to be an innocent man who simply drove his taxi past the American base at the wrong time.

Moazzam Begg claimed that while detained in the Bagram Theater Internment Facility, he was partial witness to the torture inflicted upon Dilawar.

== Death ==
The findings of Dilawar's autopsy were succinct.

Leaked internal United States Army documentation in the form of a death certificate dated 12 December 2002, ruled that his death was due to a direct result of assaults and attacks he sustained at the hands of interrogators of the 519th Military Intelligence Battalion during his stay at Bagram. The document was signed by Lt. Col. Elizabeth A. Rouse of the U.S. Air Force, a pathologist with the Armed Forces Institute of Pathology in Washington DC, and listed as its finding that the "mode of death" was "homicide," and not "natural," "accident" or "suicide" and that the cause of death was "blunt-force injuries to lower extremities complicating coronary artery disease".

A subsequent autopsy revealed that his legs had been "pulpified," and that even if Dilawar had survived, it would have been necessary to amputate his legs.

According to the death certificate shown in the documentary Taxi to the Dark Side, the box marked homicide had been checked as the ultimate cause of death. However, the military had so far publicly claimed that Dilawar had died from natural causes. It was only by accident that the death certificate was leaked when New York Times reporter Carlotta Gall managed to track down Dilawar's family in Yakubi. Dilawar's body was only repatriated to Yakubi after a government worker made contact with his uncles and arranged for return. His brother Shapoor showed Gall a folded paper he had received with Dilawar's body which he could not read because it was in English; it was the death certificate.

== Culpability ==
In August 2005, lead interrogator Specialist Glendale C. Walls of the U.S. Army pleaded guilty at a military court to pushing Dilawar against a wall and doing nothing to prevent other soldiers from abusing him. Walls was subsequently sentenced to two months in a military prison. Two other soldiers convicted in connection with the case escaped custodial sentences. The sentences were criticized by Human Rights Watch.

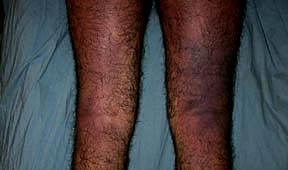
Forensic photo of Dilawar's pulpified legs

In March 2006, the CBS News program, "60 Minutes" investigated the deaths of two Afghan prisoners, including Dilawar, revealing that authorization for the abuse came from the "very top of the United States government". 60 Minutes correspondent Scott Pelley interviewed retired Army Colonel Lawrence Wilkerson, who was appointed chief of staff by Secretary of State Colin Powell in 2002, during George W. Bush's first administration. Willie V. Brand, one of the soldiers convicted of assault and maiming in the deaths of the two prisoners, and Brand's commanding officer, Capt. Christopher Beiring, were also featured in the program. Wilkerson told "60 Minutes" that he could "smell" a cover-up and was asked by Powell to investigate how American soldiers had come to use torture and stated; "I was developing the picture as to how this all got started in the first place, and that alarmed me as much as the abuse itself because it looked like authorization for the abuse went to the very top of the United States government". Brand and Beiring confirmed that several of their leaders had witnessed and knew about the abuse and torture of the prisoners.

Beiring and Brand showed no remorse when recounting the torture. Beiring was charged with dereliction of duty, a charge that was later dropped. Brand was convicted at his court martial, but rather than the 16 years in prison he was facing from the charges brought against him, he was given a reduction in rank.

In August 2005, Sgt. Selena M. Salcedo, an interrogator with the 519th Military Intelligence Battalion, admitted to mistreating Dilawar. In a military court Salcedo pleaded guilty to dereliction of duty and assault, admitting she kicked the prisoner, grabbed his head and forced him against a wall several times. Two related charges were dropped and she was reduced in rank to corporal or specialist, given a letter of reprimand and docked $250 a month in pay for four months. She could have received a year in prison, loss of a year's pay, reduction in rank to private, and a bad-conduct discharge.

== 2007 inquiry in civil court ==
In July 2007, a federal grand jury opened a civil inquiry into the Bagram abuse. Alicia A. Caldwell, writing in the Huffington Post, quoted a former military defense lawyer, named Michael Waddington, who said:

he had never heard of such a prosecution before June 2006, when federal authorities in Kentucky charged former Pfc. Steven D. Green with shooting and killing an Iraqi girl after he and other soldiers raped her.

Duane M. Grubb, Darin Broady, Christopher Greatorex and Christopher Beiring, four of the soldiers who served at the center at the time of the deaths, acknowledge that they had been called before the grand jury. They were reported to have waived immunity.

== See also ==
- Sde Teiman
