= Jimmy Savile: A British Horror Story =

2022 Netflix documentary

- Title card of the documentary
- Genre: Documentary; True crime
- Directed by: Rowan Deacon
- Starring: Jimmy Savile
- Countries of origin: United Kingdom; United States
- Original language: English
- No. of seasons: 1
- No. of episodes: 2

Production
- Running time: 79 minutes (Part 1); 91 minutes (Part 2)
- Production company: 72 Films

Original release
- Network: Netflix
- Release: April 6, 2022

Jimmy Savile: A British Horror Story is a two-part true crime documentary series released by Netflix on April 6, 2022. It covers the life and career of the British television personality Jimmy Savile, his history of committing sexual abuse, and the scandal that occurred after his death in 2011, when numerous complaints were raised about his behaviour.

== Interviewees ==
As well as colleagues, associates and victims of Savile, some of the public figures interviewed for the series include:

- Lynn Barber – journalist
- Ian Hislop – editor of Private Eye and Have I Got News for You panelist
- Mark Lawson – television critic
- Martin Young – television reporter
- Meirion Jones – investigative journalist
- Roger Ordish – BBC producer of Jim'll Fix It
- Dominic Carman – journalist
- Robin Butler – Civil Servant and Private Secretary to prime minister Margaret Thatcher
- Alison Bellamy – journalist and Savile's biographer
- Selina Scott – television journalist
- Marjorie Wallace – investigative journalist and founder of the charity SANE
- Carine Minne – forensic psychotherapist
- Andrew Neil – newspaper editor, journalist and television interviewer
- Samantha Brown - Survivor of Jimmy Savile

== Archive footage ==
A number of media personalities and significant historical figures are featured in archive footage.

- William Shatner – actor
- Margaret Thatcher – British prime minister from 1979 to 1990
- The Rolling Stones – rock band
- The Beatles – rock band
- Melvyn Bragg – novelist and television presenter
- Philip Tibenham – journalist
- Frank Muir – comedian and writer
- Desmond Llewelyn – actor
- Russell Harty – talk-show host
- Charles, Prince of Wales
- Diana, Princess of Wales
- Prince Philip, Duke of Edinburgh
- Prince Andrew, Duke of York
- Sarah, Duchess of York
- Frank Bough – television presenter
- David Icke – former television sports reporter, and later conspiracy theorist
- Gloria Hunniford – television presenter
- Anne Diamond – television presenter
- Nick Owen – television presenter
- Kylie Minogue – pop singer
- Michael Aspel – talk-show host
- Edwina Currie – British politician
- Michael Parkinson – talk-show host
- Alan Arkin – actor
- Harry Secombe – comedian and television presenter
- Pope John Paul II
- George Carman – barrister and later Queen's Counsel
- Angus Deayton – television presenter
- Ricky Gervais – comedian and actor
- Craig Charles – actor and comedian
- Rhona Cameron – comedian
- Louis Theroux – documentary filmmaker
- Gary Glitter (Paul Gadd) – pop star and convicted paedophile
- George Galloway – British politician
- Michael Barrymore – television presenter
- Chantelle Houghton – media personality
- Pete Burns – pop star
- Dennis Rodman – basketball player
- Maggot – rapper
- Preston – singer
- Traci Bingham – actress and model
- Rula Lenska – actress
- Faria Alam – former Football Association secretary
- David Cameron – British prime minister from 2010 to 2016
- Phillip Schofield – television presenter
- Holly Willoughby – television presenter
- Graham Linehan – comedy writer
- Jeremy Paxman – Newsnight presenter
- Fiona Bruce – newsreader
- Moira Stewart – newsreader
- Lorraine Kelly – television presenter
- Jon Snow – newsreader
- Huw Edwards – newsreader

== Episodes ==
No.	Title	Directed by	Original release date
1	"Part 1"	Rowan Deacon	April 6, 2022
Jimmy Savile rises to superstardom, first as a radio DJ, then as a TV presenter for Top of the Pops and children's TV show Jim'll Fix It. His apparently tireless volunteer and charity work, particularly for Stoke Mandeville Hospital, combined with his eccentric personality, make him a beloved public figure, and by the 1980s is one of the most famous faces in Britain. He develops close relationships with the British establishment, including politicians and members of the British royal family. But many who encounter him are struck by dark undercurrents to his persona, and sinister rumours circulate around his private life.
2	"Part 2"	Rowan Deacon	April 6, 2022
Savile's fame and charity work allows him extraordinary access to vulnerable patients as a volunteer at Broadmoor Psychiatric Hospital and Stoke Mandeville. Journalists probe the rumours around him but are never able to expose him, as Savile is protected by powerful political and professional connections, the affection of the general public, and his own skill in controlling and manipulating his public image. In 2007 an ageing Savile is questioned under caution by police but is not charged, and in 2011 he dies as a loved and admired "national treasure". A damning posthumous investigation by journalists at the BBC's current affairs programme Newsnight indicts Savile, but the film is shelved by the producers and never broadcast. Nearly a year after his death, Savile's crimes are finally exposed by rival TV channel ITV, creating a scandal that implicates some of the most important institutions in the country.

== Reception ==
On the review aggregator website Rotten Tomatoes, 86% of 14 critics' reviews are positive, with an average rating of 7.00/10. The website's consensus reads: "Charting the rise and fall of Jimmy Savile's public persona, A British Horror Story is a chilling examination of how a nation became enamored with a monster hiding in plain sight."

Reviewing the programme for The Independent, Louis Chilton said, "Netflix's two-part documentary is a slick and occasionally devastating portrait of Savile's evil life, but the subject matter proves too thorny for the standard true crime treatment." Carol Midgley for The Times said, "... like all documentaries about this disgusting pervert, unpleasant to watch. This is not just because of the gruesome detail, such as Savile routinely sticking his fingers into girls' vaginas and promising troubled teenagers trips to the BBC studios in return for oral sex. It is also uncomfortable because, as we know, the nation lauded, hero-worshipped and indeed knighted a psychopathic paedophile."

Writing in the Radio Times, Jane Garvey said "I was a student in the 1980s and we all 'knew' about him. There were always rumours. Some seemed faintly plausible, if unpleasant; others sounded quite outlandish and impossible, surely... In fact, they all turned out to be true. Even the outlandish stuff." The Globe and Mail's John Doyle wrote, "One approaches this very thorough, meticulous production not with the vague sense of dread that accompanies watching other true-crime docu-series. Instead, you come to it already unsettled by knowledge of the sheer scope of his crimes, and with knowledge of his fame and reputation in Britain."

== See also ==
- The Reckoning, a 2023 BBC mini-series with Steve Coogan portraying Savile
