= Kazuhiro Soda =

Japanese documentary filmmaker

- 想田 和弘
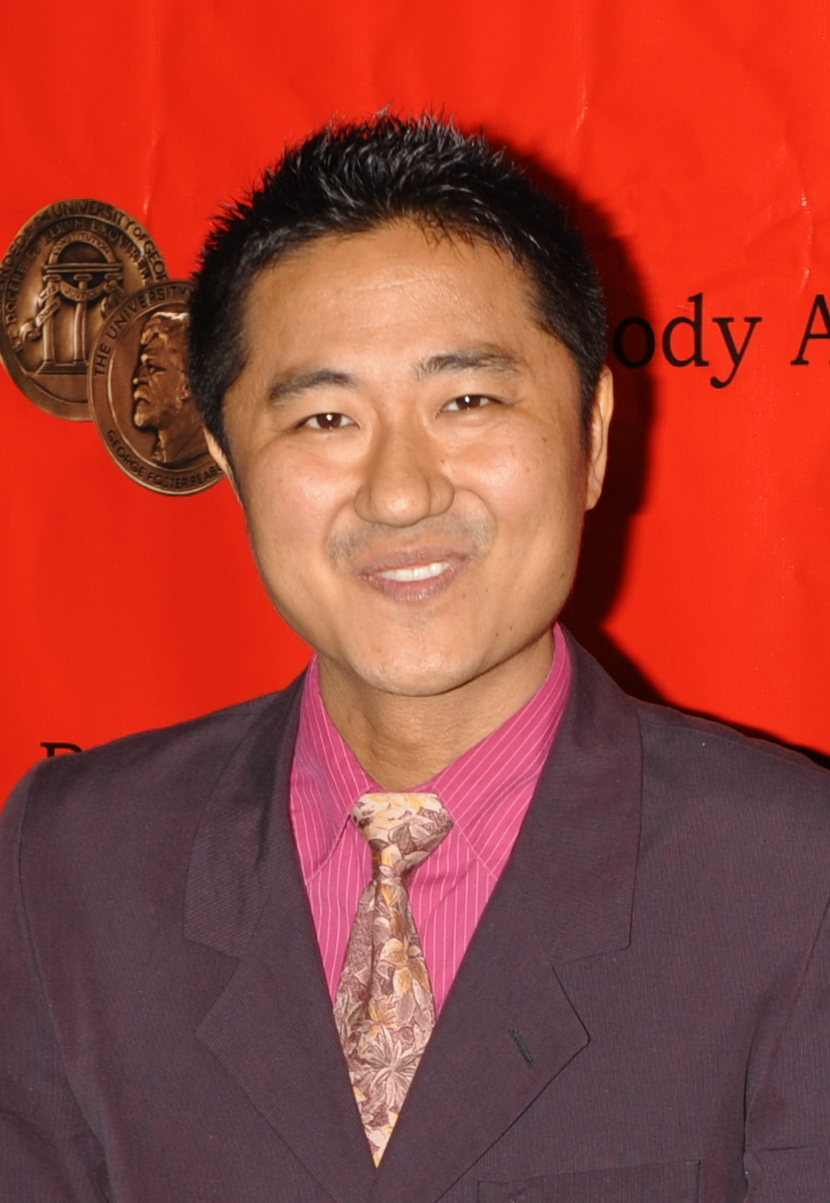
- Soda at the 68th Annual Peabody Awards
- Born: 1970 (age 55–56); Tochigi Prefecture, Japan
- Education: University of Tokyo (BA); School of Visual Arts (BFA)
- Occupation: Documentary filmmaker

Kazuhiro Soda (想田 和弘, Sōda Kazuhiro; born 1970 in Tochigi Prefecture) is a Japanese documentary filmmaker and author based in New York City. He is known for his observational method of documentary filmmaking.

Soda obtained a degree in religious studies from the University of Tokyo in 1993 and a BFA in filmmaking from the School of Visual Arts in New York, where he has remained since, in 1997.

== Career ==
Soda worked as a television director for NHK from 1997 to 2005.

In 2005, he shot Campaign (Senkyo) (2007, 120 minutes), depicting a political campaign in Kawasaki, Japan by Kazuhiko Yamauchi, an inexperienced outsider candidate officially endorsed by the Japanese Liberal Democratic Party. When completed, it was invited to the forum section of Berlin International Film Festival in 2007. PBS broadcast a 52-minute version, which won the Peabody Award in 2008. The TV version was broadcast under a different title, Campaign! The Kawasaki Candidate as part of the Why Democracy? series, a global media event co-produced by 33 broadcasters around the world, including the BBC, CBC, and NHK. The 120-minute theatrical version won the Best Documentary Award at the Belgrade International Documentary Film Festival in 2008.

From 2005 to 2007, Soda shot Mental (Seishin) (2008, 135 minutes), which focuses on the lives of patients in a small mental clinic Chorale Okayama in Japan. The film was world-premiered at the Pusan International Film Festival in 2008, and won the Best Documentary Award (PIFF Mecenat Award) there. It also won the Best Documentary Award at the Dubai International Film Festival in December 2008. Other awards include Special Jury Mention at the 2009 Miami International Film Festival, Outstanding Documentary Award at the 2009 Hong Kong International Film Festival, and Inter-religious Jury Prize at Visions du Reel in 2009.

In September 2010, Soda premiered a documentary, Peace (2010, 75 minutes), as the opening film of the DMZ International Documentary Film Festival (DMZ Docs). Peace depicts the lives of people with disabilities and cats in Okayama, Japan, and was initially commissioned by DMZ Docs as a short documentary. Peace later won the Audience Award at Tokyo Filmex, Buyens-Chagoll Award at Visions du Reel, and Best Documentary Award at the Hong Kong International Film Festival.

In 2009, Soda started shooting Theater 1 and Theatre 2, a documentary series about a playwright/theater director Oriza Hirata and his company, Seinendan. The series was world-premiered at the Busan International Film Festival in 2012, and won the Young Jury's Prize at the Festival des 3 Continents in Nantes, France in 2012.

== Works ==
=== Fiction films ===
- A Night in New York (1995), writer/director/editor
- A Flower and a Woman (1995), writer/director/editor
- Freezing Sunlight (1996), writer/director/editor
- The Flicker (1997), writer/director/editor

=== Documentary films ===
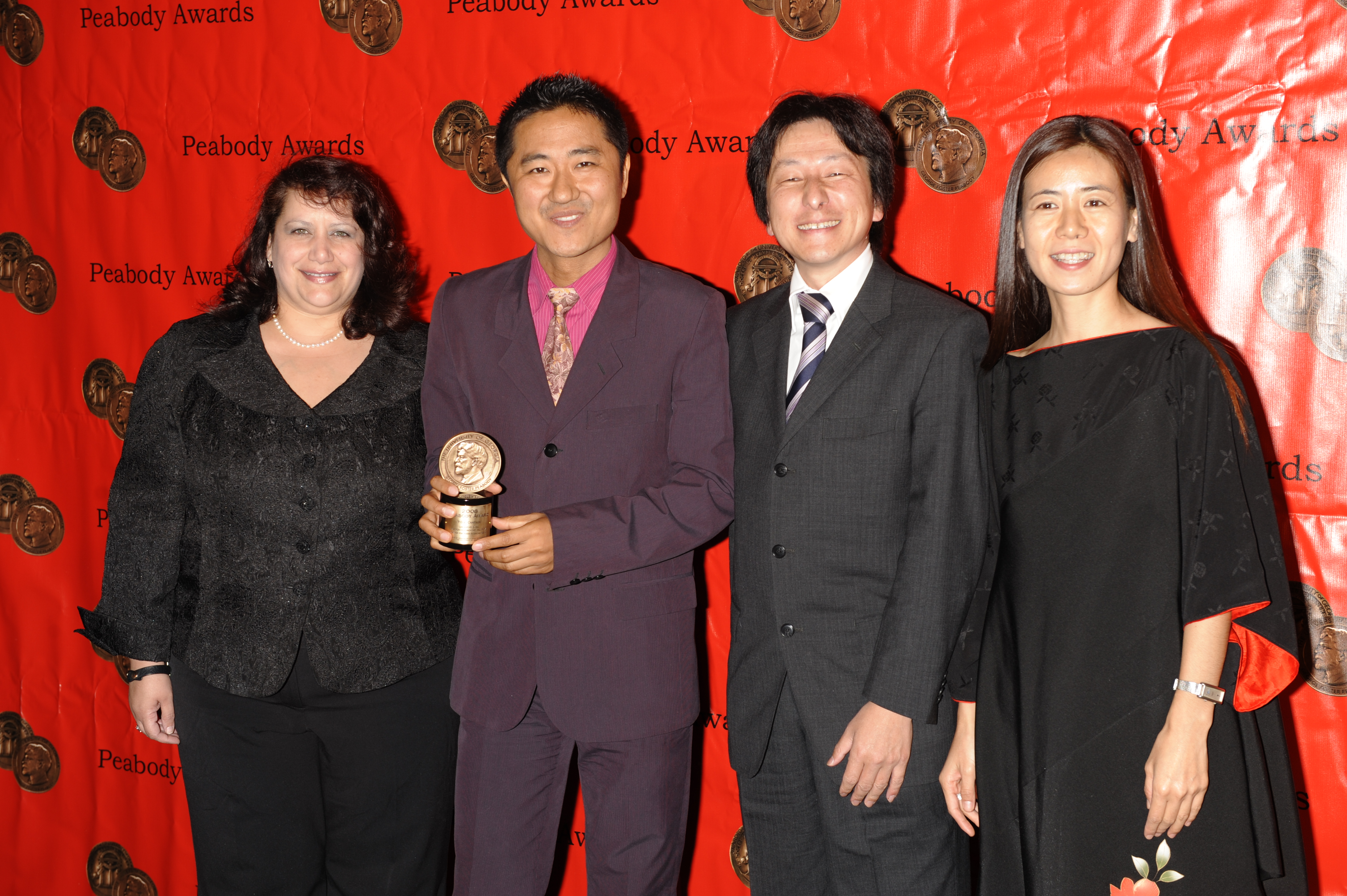
Kazuhiro Soda, Kasuhiko Yamauchi and the crew of POV- Campaign

- Campaign (2007), writer/director/editor/producer
- Mental (2008), writer/director/editor/producer
- Peace (2010), writer/director/editor/producer
- Theatre 1 (2012), writer/director/editor/producer
- Theatre 2 (2012), writer/director/editor/producer
- Campaign 2 (2013), writer/director/editor/producer
- Oyster Factory (2015), writer/director/editor/producer
- The Big House (2018), director/editor/producer
- Inland Sea (2018), director/editor/producer
- Zero (2020), director/editor/producer
- The Cats of Gokogu Shrine (2024), director/editor/producer

=== Books ===
- Mental Illness and Mosaic (Chuohoki Publishing), 2009 ISBN 978-4-8058-3014-7
- The Reason Why I Make Documentaries (Kodansha Publishing), 2010 ISBN 4062881136
- Theatre vs. Film - Can a Documentary Capture Fiction? (Iwanami Publishing), 2012 ISBN 4000222880
