= The Force (2009 TV series) =

British television documentary series

- Genre: Observational documentary
- Created by: Oxford Film and Television; Patrick Forbes
- Narrated by: Mark Strong
- Country of origin: United Kingdom
- Original language: English
- No. of series: 1
- No. of episodes: 3

Original release
- Network: Channel 4
- Release: 13 October – 27 October 2009

The Force is a series of three observational documentary programmes created for Channel 4 by Oxford Film and Television and Patrick Forbes, following the work of Hampshire Constabulary. The first episode follows a murder investigation after a burnt body is found, the second follows the work of a dedicated rape unit, while the third follows a case of arson/murder, nine months after the incident. The series, which was first run from 13 to 27 October 2009, was well received by critics, who said the documentary was more interesting than they had anticipated.

== Commissioning ==
Oxford Film and Television was commissioned by Channel 4 to produce a three-part documentary covering policing in modern Britain. Filming for The Force, which began in 2006, was directed by Patrick Forbes, and was not finished until 2009. The programme was intended to form the climax of Channel 4's unofficial season covering social institutions in the United Kingdom, along with The Family, The Benefit Business and The Hospital. Simon Dickson, the Channel 4 head of documentaries, said-

There is no official season but when all these ideas starting with The Family came in we thought it was a satisfying idea to have a series of programmes which cover social institutions ... So we have the family, the police, the benefits system and the NHS from last autumn to the end of this year. These programmes really get to the heart of the subjects – in The Hospital we see how people working for the NHS really feel about their jobs and the way they do their jobs ... The same goes for The Force. They all speak in a very natural way rather than in that procedural way people in similar positions can speak on camera.

== Format ==
The first episode followed a single murder over the course of the investigation. The body of a woman was found burnt in a suitcase in the Hampshire countryside. After initial confusion concerning forensic and DNA evidence, a numberplate led to Ziaul Haque, who worked in the same hotel as a Polish woman who had been reported missing. Haque was questioned, but it was not until CCTV footage of him carrying a suitcase to his room with ease, before dragging it back down, was found that he was charged with murder. Haque then commit suicide in his cell.

The second episode of the series followed Crystal, a dedicated rape unit in Portsmouth. Crystal was the first unit of its kind established outside London. The third episode looked at a 2007 case of arson and murder, nine months after the incident, as it is investigated by Hampshire's Major Crime Unit. The series featured "unprecedented" access to the police, and was edited to include "24-style split-screens and portentous piano score", which Andrew Pettie, writing for The Daily Telegraph, said served to "undermine the subject matter by highlighting the difference between real police work and the slick, seamless way it is usually portrayed on television". Despite the editing, the segments were date-stamped, so that viewers could understand the timeframe.

== Reception ==
The Force was well received by critics. Andrew Pettie, writing for The Daily Telegraph, described the first episode as following "a shockingly unpleasant – and therefore macabrely fascinating – murder investigation". Rachel Cooke, writing for the New Statesman, said the programme "is compelling television, the kind that you watch with a queasy feeling, and all your fingers crossed", and added that it "has been carefully made, over a period of several years, and beautifully edited, and it tells you a great deal more about 21st-century Britain than anything in Ian Rankin." Both reviewers noted that The Force was more interesting than they had anticipated.

The Force won the prize for the best documentary series at the 2010 Grierson Awards.
