= Freedom Swimmer =

- Film poster
- Directed by: Olivia Martin McGuire
- Written by: Olivia Martin McGuire
- Produced by: Ron Dyens, Brooke Tia Silcox
- Release date: August 2021
- Running time: 15mn
- Country: Australia

Freedom Swimmer is a 2021 Australian animated short film directed by Olivia Martin McGuire. The short is a fifteen minute documentary telling the story of a man and his daughter who swam from China to Hong Kong during the Cultural Revolution. Following its premiere at the Melbourne International Film Festival, the short has been featured in several film festivals including Slamdance Film Festival, Palm Springs International ShortsFest and the Calgary International Film Festival, where it was awarded for Best Documentary Short.

== Plot ==
A grandfather’s embarks on a courageous journey and a perilous swim from China to Hong Kong that parallels his granddaughter’s own quest for a new freedom.

== Reception ==
Since its launch, the film has been selected in various festivals and academies around the world:

Year	Festivals	Award/Category	Status
2021	Sydney Film Festival	Best Animated Film	Won
2021	Kendal Mountain Festival	Best Creative Film	Won
2022	Palm Springs International ShortsFest	HP Bridging the Borders Award	Won
2022	Manhattan Short Film Festival	Bronze Medal	Nominated
2022	Aspen Shortsfest	Ellen Jury Award for Best Animation	Won
2022	GLAS Animation Festival	Grand Prix	Nominated
2022	Calgary International Film Festival	Best Documentary Short	Won
2022	Grierson British Documentary Awards	Special Mention for Best Documentary Short	Won
2022	Santa Fe International Film Festival	Best Documentary Short	Won
2022	AIDC Awards	Best Short-Form Documentary	Won
