= Tim Golden (journalist) =

American journalist and editor

Tim Golden (born 1961 in Los Angeles) is an American journalist. He was the managing editor for news and investigations at The Marshall Project, and before that, a senior writer at The New York Times, where he spent two decades as an investigative reporter, foreign correspondent and national correspondent, while also contributing cover stories to The New York Times Magazine. He has twice shared the Pulitzer Prize for journalism.

Golden graduated from Dartmouth College and was a Nieman fellow at Harvard University.

Golden appeared in Alex Gibney's film, Taxi to the Dark Side. Golden obtained confidential files of the army investigation of Abu Ghraib torture and prisoner abuse.

== New America ==
Golden was a Bernard L. Schwartz Fellow with the New America Foundation from 2008 to 2010.
