= Talk to Me (2006 film) =

- Film poster
- Directed by: Mark Craig
- Written by: Mark Craig
- Produced by: Mark Craig
- Starring: Mark Craig
- Cinematography: Ken Morse
- Edited by: Dan Haythorn
- Music by: Steve Alexander
- Production company: Stopwatch Productions
- Distributed by: British Documentary Film Foundation
- Release date: August 2006 (Edinburgh)
- Running time: 23 minutes
- Country: United Kingdom
- Language: English

Talk To Me is a 2006 British documentary film directed by and starring Mark Craig. The film won 'Best Short Doc' upon its debut at the Boulder International Film Festival in 2006.

== Synopsis ==
The film follows Craig's relationships over a twenty-year period using answer phone tapes and photos of the time. The recordings were originally kept as 'a sort of diary' though this eventually developed into the film.

== Release ==
The film screened in 2007 at the Ashland Independent Film Festival in Ashland, Oregon, and in June that year at the National Media Museum in Bradford, West Yorkshire, England, It was previously available on More 4, 4od and DVD with some of the original soundtracks removed due to copyright reasons. This version is available on archive.org.

== Reception ==
The Daily Telegraph wrote that Mark Craig's use of onscreen photographs of his various callers from over a 20+ year period was a "brilliant collage" and "so inventive that it aspired to the condition of drama". They lauded the film, writing "The cleverness of this work was that it gave a complete portrait not only of the callers, but also of Mark [the filmmaker]", and that it "conveyed a real sense of non-communication and of life's dramas."

=== Awards and nominations ===
- 2006, won 'Best Short Doc' at Boulder International Film Festival
- 2007, won 'Grierson Innovation award' at Sheffield International Documentary Festival
- 2007, won 'Special Mention' for 'Best Short Doc' at Hot Docs Canadian International Documentary Festival
