= Yakubi =

Settlement in Khost Province, Afghanistan

Yaqubi
- Location in Afghanistan
- Coordinates: 33°27′39″N 69°59′24″E
- Country: Afghanistan
- Province: Khost Province
- District: Sabari District
- Elevation: 3,652 ft (1,113 m)
- Time zone: UTC+4:30

Yaqubi (Pashto: یعقوبي) is the center of Sabari District in Khost Province, Afghanistan. It is located on 33.4608°N 69.99°E at 1,113 m altitude in the southeastern part of the district.

Yaqubi was the birthplace and home of Dilawar, an Afghan farmer and taxi driver who was tortured to death in 2002 by US Army soldiers at the Bagram Collection Point, a US military detention center in Afghanistan.

== See also ==
- Khost Province
