= Iris Zaki =

Israeli film maker

Iris Zaki (Hebrew: איריס זכי) is an Israeli film maker. She is best known for her film Unsettling which is a documentary about Zaki (a left wing Israeli) living in the Israeli settlement of Tekoa for two months. An earlier film by Zaki, Women in Sink, received 13 awards and has been screened at over 120 festivals and universities. Zaki teaches ethnographic and documentary filmmaking.

Zaki completed her PhD at Royal Holloway, University of London. She wrote her doctoral dissertation on whether it was possible to film a conversation without creating the feel of an interview. She calls the technique "The Abandoned Camera". While filming Unsettling Zaki says, "It took a long time for people to calm down and feel comfortable with my presence".

Zaki's is the granddaughter to Jewish Egyptian singer Souad Zaki and Muslim Egyptian qanun player Mohammed Elakkad. Her father Moshe Zaki is a psychologist in Haifa and her brother Uri Zaki is a political activist and former representative of B'Tselem in Washington.
