= Kingdom of Us =

2017 documentary film

- Directed by: Lucy Cohen
- Produced by: Julia Nottingham, Tessa Treadway
- Starring: Jamie-Jodie Shanks, Kacie-Kimie Shanks, Lorie-Lanie Shanks
- Cinematography: Charlie Goodger
- Edited by: Michael Aaglund, Stephen Haren, Maya Maffioli
- Music by: Valentina Pappalardo, David E. Sugar
- Distributed by: Netflix
- Release date: October 13, 2017
- Running time: 109 minutes
- Country: United Kingdom
- Language: English

Kingdom of Us is a 2017 documentary film directed by Lucy Cohen and featuring Jamie-Jodie, Kacie-Kimie, Lorie-Lanie, Mirie-Marie, Nikita-Nina, Osborn-Oran, Pippa-Peita and Vikie Shanks.

The film was released by Netflix on October 13, 2017.

== Premise ==
The documentary follows how the seven children of Paul and Vikie Shanks, four of whom are autistic, are coping with life and handling the traumatic event of their father's 2007 suicide.

== Protagonists ==
- Jamie-Jodie Shanks
- Kacie-Kimie Shanks
- Lorie-Lanie Shanks
- Mirie-Marie Shanks
- Nikita-Nina Shanks
- Osborn-Oran Shanks
- Pippa-Peita Shanks
- Vikie Shanks

== Release ==
Kingdom of Us was released on October 13, 2017 on Netflix streaming.
