= Sons of Cuba =

- Theatrical release poster
- Directed by: Andrew Lang
- Produced by: Francine Heywood; Laura Giles; Andrew Lang
- Cinematography: Domingo Triana Machin
- Edited by: Simon Rose
- Distributed by: Cinetic Rights Management; Ro*co Films
- Release date: October 12, 2009 (Los Angeles Latino Film Festival)
- Running time: 88 minutes
- Country: Cuba
- Language: Spanish

Sons of Cuba is a 2009 documentary film set in the Havana Boxing Academy, a school at the heart of Cuba's Olympic success in the ring. It follows the stories of three young hopefuls through eight months of training and schooling as they prepare for Cuba's National Boxing Championship for Under-12's. Sons of Cuba was directed by Andrew Lang and is distributed by Cinetic Rights Management for the US and Canada and Ro*co Films for the rest of the world.

== Awards and nominations ==
- Winner, Best Documentary at the 2009 Los Angeles Latino International Film Festival
- Winner, Best Documentary at the 2009 International Rome Film Festival
- Winner, Youth Jury Award at the 2009 Sheffield Doc/Fest
- Winner, Best Film on Latin America by a non-Latin American at the 2009 Havana Film Festival
- Winner, Best Documentary by the 2009 Foundation of New Latin American Cinema
- Nominated, Best Documentary at the 2009 British Independent Film Awards
- Opening Night Film at the 2009 Full Frame Documentary Film Festival
