= Nick Fraser =

British journalist (born 1948)

Nick Fraser (born 21 January 1948) is a British documentary producer and journalist.

== Education ==
Fraser was educated at Eton College, and graduated from Exeter College, Oxford in 1969.

== BBC and Storyville ==
Fraser spent seventeen years at the BBC, where he created and ran the international documentary strand Storyville. In 2016 he left the BBC to launch the documentary streaming platform Docsville.

== Books and The Why Foundation ==
Fraser is also a founder and executive producer of the Danish nonprofit organisation The Why Foundation, and has authored several non-fiction books.

== Honors and awards ==
Fraser received the 2017 BAFTA Special Award for his work in the field of documentary.

== Bibliography ==
- 2019 Say What Happened: A Story of Documentaries. Faber & Faber, ISBN 0571329578, 9780571329571.
- 2012 The Importance of Being Eton. Hachette UK, ISBN 1780721595, 9781780721590.
- 2012 Why Documentaries Matter. Reuters Institute for the Study of Journalism, Department of Politics and International Relations, University of Oxford, ISBN 190738409X, 9781907384097.
- 2000 The Voice of Modern Hatred: Encounters with Europe's New Right. Picador, ISBN 0330372122, 9780330372121.
