= Jan Baz =

Afghan warlord

Jan Baz Khan is an Afghan warlord who is known for his role in the arrests of several innocent civilians during the war in Afghanistan. Despite a lack of evidence, those arrested were kept detained in American custody for prolonged periods of times while two of the men, Dilawar and Habibullah, were killed within days of their detainment by American soldiers at Bagram Collection Point, gaining prominence as high-profile victims in the conflict during the later scandal surrounding the Bagram torture and prisoner abuse. It was determined that Jan Baz Khan had used the civilians as scapegoats after Khan's militia staged an attack on Camp Salerno, which they had been hired to protect.

== War in Afghanistan ==
Jan Baz Khan was a regional militia leader in Khost Province. He is a nephew to Pacha Khan Zadran, an ex-mujahideen fighter also aligned with US troops. In 2002, following the United States invasion of Afghanistan, Khan was hired by the CIA as security to Camp Salerno. His militia performed intelligence gathering and served as additional reinforcement in US patrols and raids on local villages.

On 1 December 2002, Jan Baz Khan's militia fired three rockets at the camp, telling his American superiors that the attack was perpetrated by insurgents. The army offered Khan a bounty if he captured the attackers and within the day, the militia brought in over a dozen innocent suspects. Four of those detained, Dilawar, Parkhudin, Zakim Khan, and Abdul Rahim, were chosen at random because they happened to have been driving near the camp after the rocket attack; Dilawar was a taxi driver and the other three were his passengers. Dilawar was tortured to death by American soldiers at Bagram prison nine days after being detained. Intelligence analysts had determined Jan Baz Khan's deception by February 2003, although Parkhudin, Zakim Khan and Abdul Rahim were nevertheless kept at Bagram, and later transferred to Guantanamo Bay.

Qadir Khandan, a pharmacist and National Directorate of Security employee, stated that he had found out about the false arrest scheme of Jan Baz and Pacha Khan, both of whom received monetary rewards for the turning-in of suspects. Khandan himself was implicated by the pair and held in custody between 2002 and 2006 after they made false accusations that Khandan was running a safehouse for bombmakers.

Jan Baz Khan was arrested by US forces on 5 January 2003. General Dan K. McNeill confirmed that Khan was captured, but related that he was not in military custody. He had alluded that he was being handled by "another agency", which was confirmed as the CIA in 2004 by an unnamed official, who stated that Khan was being held at Bagram with no set release date.

On 20 August 2012, it was reported that three family members of Pacha Khan Zadran were killed outside of Gardez in a Taliban attack. They were identified as Zadran's brother, uncle, and nephew, although only the former, Mirza Ali, was named.
