= Weijun Chen =

Chinese director, cinematographer, screenwriter, and producer

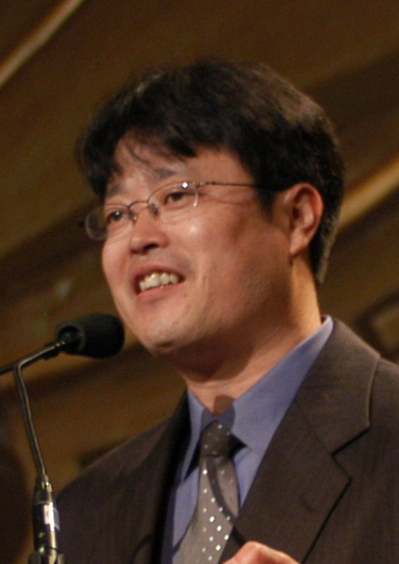
Weijun Chen, in 2004.

Weijun Chen (Chinese 陈为军; born November 30, 1969) is a Chinese documentary director, cinematographer, screenwriter and producer, now working for the Wuhan TV Station. He started his career in the film industry in 1994, known for his first documentary film To Live is Better Than to Die (2003), which won the Peabody Awards in 2003 and nominated for the World Documentary at the 2003 Sundance Film Festival, Please Vote for Me (2007) was selected into Oscar documentary feature shortlist, it was purchased by over 100 TV Stations, including BBC and PBS. His recent work This is Life (2017) receives domestic attention. His films mainly focus on documentary realism, which reflects introspection of social reality.

== Filmography ==
| Year | Film | Running time |
|---|---|---|
| 2003 | To Live is Better Than to Die | 88 minutes |
| 2007 | Please Vote for Me | 58 minutes |
| 2008 | The Biggest Chinese Restaurant in the World | 80 minutes |
| 2012 | Education, Education | 59 minutes |
| 2016 | This is Life | 105 minutes |
| 2017 | This is Life (TV series documentary) (13 episodes) | 70 minutes / episode |

== Experience and style ==
In 1992, Weijun Chen graduated from department of journalism in Sichuan University, after watching documentary films Long Ji (1994) (龙脊) and Odyssey of The Great Wall (1991) (望长城), he got impressed by the cinematography of these two films, realized that documentary film could be not that "official". While working for the Wuhan TV Station, he tried to make some documentary films, the first film he made is about a professor of philosophy, Xiaomang Deng who works at Wuhan University, and an engineer Ping Xiao works for Wuhan Meat Processing Factory, these two person seem to be irrelevant in terms of occupation, whereas Chen finds there are some common aspects in their daily life, so this becomes one of his filming style, putting irrelevant person into same story and see the magical effects.

He also suggests young filmmakers to get more experience from their daily life. "If you really want to make a good film, you should treat your friends, partners and children, all these relationships sincerely. Your feeling maybe incomplete because your life experience is not completed. If you don't support a family, you won't know the expense; If you don't get married, you won't know how hard to keep a relationship; If you don't have a baby, you won't know how difficult to raise he/her. The life experience just like a tree, shade grows with the tree branches spread out."

He stated that most things happen in real life is more exciting than script, people in real life are more touchable than actor/actress, documentary films are not synonymous with dullness, it should be seen by more people. He believes that documentary films are able to bring experience for audience instead of solving problems or making statements.

== Accolades ==
- To Live is Better Than to Die (2003)
  - 2003 Peabody Awards
  - 2003 Sundance Film Festival – World Documentary (Nominated)
  - 2003 IDFA Competition – Feature-Length Documentary (Nominated)
  - 2004 The Grierson Awards – Best International Television Documentary
- Please Vote for Me (2007)
  - 2007 Traverse City Film Festival – Founders Prize
  - 2007 DOCNZ – Best Medium Length Documentary
  - 2007 DOCNZ – Best Educational Documentary
  - 2007 Silverdocs Film Festival – Sterling Feature Award
  - 2008 Full Frame Documentary Film Festival – Working Films Award
  - 2008 Jackson Hole Film Festival – Best Documentary
  - 2008 Danish TV Oscar
  - 2008 Ashland Independent Film Festival – Best Documentary
  - 2008 Grierson Award – Most Entertaining Documentary
  - 2008 Chicago International Children's Film Festival – Children's Jury, 2nd Prize
  - 2008 Chicago International Children's Film Festival – Adult's Jury, 1st Prize
  - 2008 Taiwan International Children's Film Festival – Special Jury Prize
  - 2008 Roshd International Film Festival – Golden Stature
  - 2008 International Emmy – Best Documentary (Nominated)
  - 2008 10th Seoul International Youth Film Festival – SIYFF Eyes Award

== Major works ==
To Live is Better Than to Die (2003) is Weijun Chen's first documentary film, he records a poor family living in the rural area of Wenluo in Henan province, where 60% of the residents are HIV positive. Like other villagers, the parents Ma Shenyi and his wife Leimei have sold their blood for money in the early nineties and got infected with HIV virus due to the poor sanitary facilities, passed the virus to their two youngest kids except for the elder daughter. Weijun Chen started his filming in 2001 summer, he pretended to be a local resident and hid his camera into a bag in order to evade the restrictions from local government. By recording the catastrophe caused by AIDS in Ma's family through heat summer, mid autumn, freezing winter and the Spring Festival, the unemotional cinematography style telling a heartbreaking story.

Chen said it is hard to portray democracy in China, the Please Vote for Me (2007) story just come to his mind, when he knew a colleague's child is going to have an election for monitor in his class. What does democracy like in children's eyes? Because "children are like mirrors that reflects the truth", so he decided to shoot a "real" democracy election in a third-grade class of Evergreen Primary School in Wuhan. It takes him 3 months to get familiar with the students, 4 weeks for filming, which also includes glimpses into Chinese education system about the routine school life like flag raising, lunch time, exercise, and parental education as well. "There are not too many people really care about the democracy, and fewer of them interested in democracy in China, however people really care for children." He comes up with a metaphor about the structure of the film, "lots of people don't like to eat the skin of buns, if you try to entice them with delicious filling, they would eat both of them."

In This is Life, Weijun Chen focus on four pregnant women and their family to explore the problem behind Chinese medical insurance system, the clichés in rural villages, and the ethical problems as well. It takes Weijiun Chen and his team more than 700 days to track families in the department of gynecology in Wuhan University Zhongnan Hospital. Giving birth to new life makes the delivery rooms combine with life and death, hopes and disappointment, and also the gap between old and young generation. The Chinese title of this film is "Sheng Men" (生门), according to the director, which means those mothers who crossed from the gate of life and death. "It really piercing my heart when I saw a woman dead for childbirth."
