= Please Vote for Me =

- Directed by: Weijun Chen
- Produced by: Don Edkins
- Edited by: Jean Tsien
- Production company: Steps International
- Distributed by: First Run Features
- Release date: September 6, 2007 (Toronto International Film Festival)
- Running time: 58 minutes
- Country: China
- Language: Mandarin

Please Vote for Me (Chinese: 请投我一票; pinyin: Qǐng tóu wǒ yī piào) is a 2007 documentary film following the elections for class monitor in a 3rd grade class of eight-year-old children in the Evergreen Primary School in Wuhan, China. The candidates, Luo Lei, Xu Xiaofei, and Cheng Cheng, compete against each other for the coveted role and are egged on by their teachers and doting parents. This was reported to be an interesting use of classic democratic voting principles and interpersonal dynamics.

The documentary gives a glimpse into China's contemporary urban middle classes. It won the Sterling Feature Award at Silverdocs in 2007. In November 2007, Please Vote for Me was named by the Academy of Motion Picture Arts and Sciences as one of 15 films on its documentary feature Oscar shortlist. The list was narrowed to five films on January 22, 2008, but Please Vote for Me did not make it to the final five.

The film is part of the "Why Democracy?" series. It was aired in no less than 35 countries, including the BBC in the UK and PBS (as part of Independent Lens) in the United States.

== Plot ==
An experiment in democracy is taking place in Wuhan, China. For the first time ever, the students in grade three at Evergreen Primary School in Wuhan, China have been asked to elect a class monitor. Traditionally appointed by the teacher, the class monitor holds a powerful position, helping to control the students, keeping them on task and doling out punishment to those who disobey. The teacher has chosen three candidates: Luo Lei (a boy), the current class monitor; Cheng Cheng (a boy); and Xu Xiaofei (a girl). Each candidate is asked to choose two assistants to help with his or her campaign.

To prove their worthiness, the candidates must perform in three events. First is a talent show, where each candidate plays an instrument or sings a song. Second is a debate, in which the candidates bring up the shortcomings of their opponents as well as their own personal qualifications. And finally, each candidate must deliver a speech, an opportunity to appeal directly to classmates and ask for their votes.

At home, each of the children is coached by his or her parents and pushed to practice and memorize for each stage of the campaign. Although their parents are supportive, the candidates feel the pressure. Tears and the occasional angry outburst reveal the emotional impact. At school, the candidates talk to classmates one-on-one, making promises, planning tactics (including negative ones) and at times expressing doubts about their own candidacies.

For all three children, the campaign takes its toll, especially for the losing candidates and their assistants. Viewers are left to decide if the experiment in democracy has been “successful” and what it might mean for democracy education in China. PLEASE VOTE FOR ME challenges those committed to China’s democratization to consider the feasibility of, and processes involved in its implementation.

== Bibliography ==
- "Please Vote for Me: A crash course in democracy" by Ronault L.S. Catalani, review of the film in The Asian Reporter, V17, #42 (October 16, 2007), pages 16 & 20.
