= Gita Sahgal =

Indian writer and journalist (born 1956 or 1957)

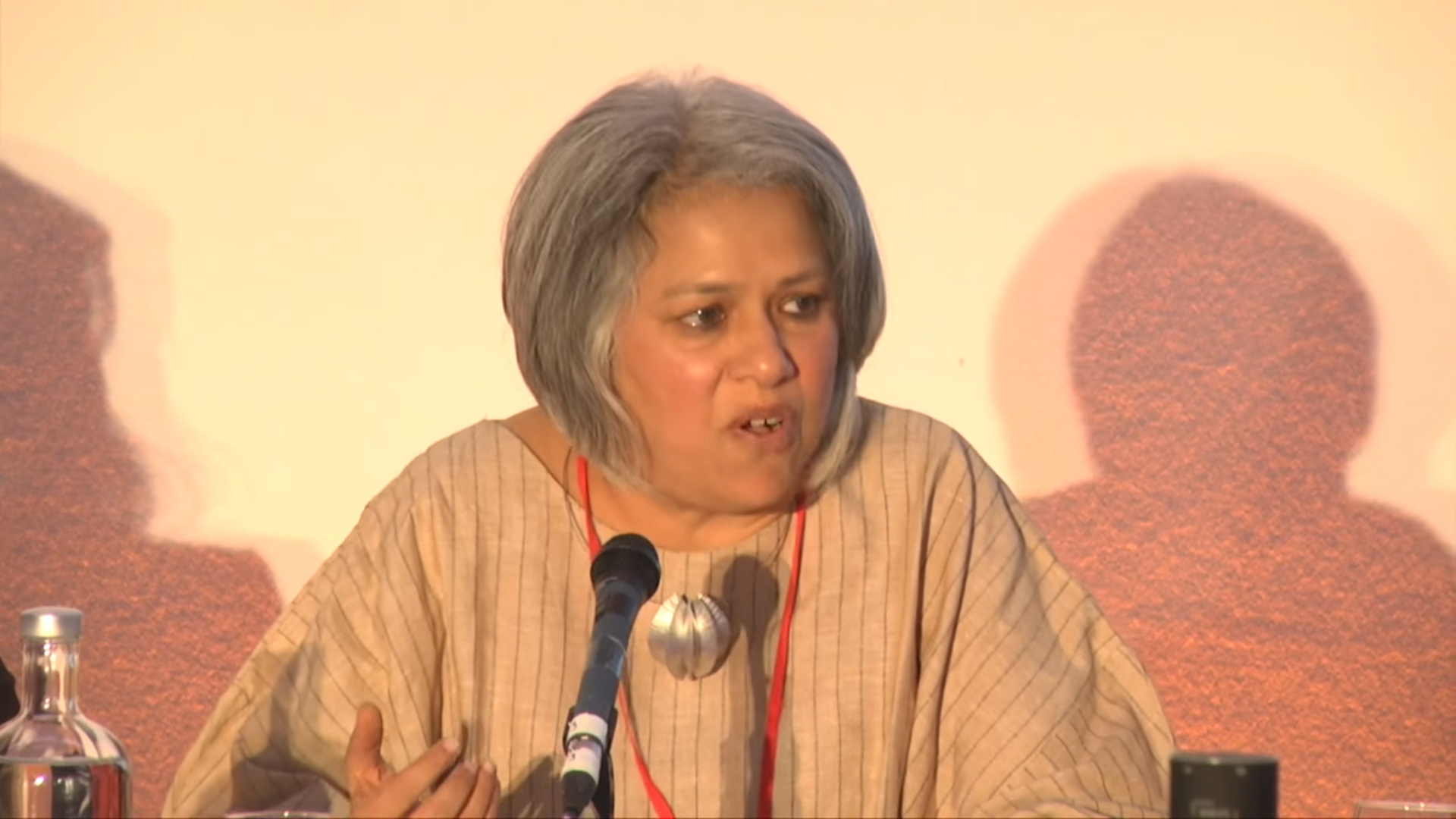
- Sahgal speaking in London, July 2017
- Born: 1956 or 1957 (age 69–70); Bombay, Bombay State, India
- Citizenship: United Kingdom
- Education: School of Oriental and African Studies
- Occupations: Writer; Journalist; Film director; Human rights activist
- Parent: Nayantara Sahgal (mother)
- Relatives: Vijaya Lakshmi Pandit (grandmother); Jawaharlal Nehru (great uncle)

Gita Sahgal (born 1956 or 1957) is a British writer, journalist, film director, feminist activist, and human rights activist, whose work focuses on the issues of feminism, fundamentalism, and racism.

She has been a co-founder and member of women's organisations. She has also been head of Amnesty International's Gender Unit, and has opposed the oppression of women in particular by religious fundamentalists.

In February 2010, Sahgal was suspended by Amnesty as head of its Gender Unit, after she was quoted by The Sunday Times criticising Amnesty for its high-profile associations with Moazzam Begg, director of the campaign group Cage (formerly Cageprisoners), that represents men detained at Guantanamo Bay under extrajudicial conditions. Sahgal referred to him as "Britain's most famous supporter of the Taliban".

Amnesty responded that Sahgal had been suspended "for not raising these issues internally". Speaking in her support were novelist Salman Rushdie, journalist Christopher Hitchens, and others, who criticised Amnesty for the affiliation. Begg disputed her claims of his jihadi connections, and said that he did not consider anyone a terrorist who had not been convicted of terrorism.

Sahgal left Amnesty International on 9 April 2010.

== Early life and education ==
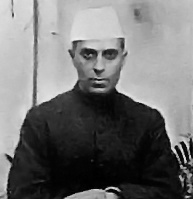
Sahgal's great-uncle, former Indian Prime Minister Jawaharlal Nehru

Gita Sahgal was born in India, the daughter of the novelist Nayantara Sahgal. She was raised as a Hindu, and says she is now an atheist. She is a great-niece of former Indian Prime Minister Jawaharlal Nehru, and the granddaughter of his sister, Vijayalakshmi Pandit. Schooled first in India, she moved to England in 1972, where she attended, and graduated from, the School of Oriental and African Studies in London. She returned to India in 1977, and began working in the civil rights movement. She moved back to England in 1983.

== Career ==
=== Activism ===
==== Women's organisations ====
In 1979, she co-founded Southall Black Sisters, a non-profit organisation based in Southall, West London.

In 1989, she co-founded "Women against Fundamentalism". It has criticised Great Britain for protecting only Christianity and its blasphemy laws. She believes this exclusion of protection for immigrant religions contributes to the growth of sectarianism, and immigrants' turning towards religious fundamentalism.

==== War rape ====
Commenting on the use of rape in ethnic conflicts, Sahgal said in 2004 that such assaults are not typically a means of taking women as "spoils of war" or meeting sexual needs. She said that rape is used intentionally as a way to disrupt the conquered society, and to increase the territory of the conquering ethnic group via impregnating the conquered women.

==== Prostitution and peacekeeping efforts ====
Sahgal spoke out in 2004 regarding the increase of prostitution and sex abuse associated with humanitarian intervention forces. She observed: "The issue with the UN is that peacekeeping operations unfortunately seem to be doing the same thing that other militaries do. Even the guardians have to be guarded."

==== Invasion of Iraq; Views on Guantanamo Bay ====
Sahgal, who was against the United States and allies' invasion of Iraq, also condemned the extrajudicial detention and torture of Muslim men at Guantanamo Bay. She told Moazzam Begg, a British citizen and former Guantanamo Bay detainee, that she was "horrified and appalled" by the treatment he and other detainees received.

==== Secularism ====
Maryam Namazie and Sahgal (right) deliver the Freethinkers' Declaration at the International Conference on Freedom of Conscience and Expression in London, 2017

Gita Sahgal is the executive director of the Centre for Secular Space, and an honorary associate of the National Secular Society.

=== Writing and film producer ===
Among her various writings, in 1992, she contributed to, and co-edited, Refusing Holy Orders: Women and Fundamentalism in Britain, with Nira Yuval-Davis.

In 2002, she produced Tying the Knot. The film was commissioned by the U.K.'s Foreign and Commonwealth Office's Community Liaison Unit, set up to handle the problem of British victims of forced marriage who have been, or may be, taken abroad to marry against their will. Sahgal said she was not opposed to arranged marriages, unless the persons involved were abducted or subjected to physical or emotional abuse.

Saghal also made Unprovoked, a film about the case of Kiranjit Ahluwalia, for Channel 4's Dispatches documentary series. Ahluwalia was a Punjabi woman brought to the UK for an arranged marriage who was repeatedly abused by her husband. To survive, she killed him, setting him on fire, while he was drunk and asleep.

In addition, Sahgal produced the British documentary film, The War Crimes File, about atrocities committed during the Bangladesh Liberation War of 1971.

== Amnesty International controversy ==
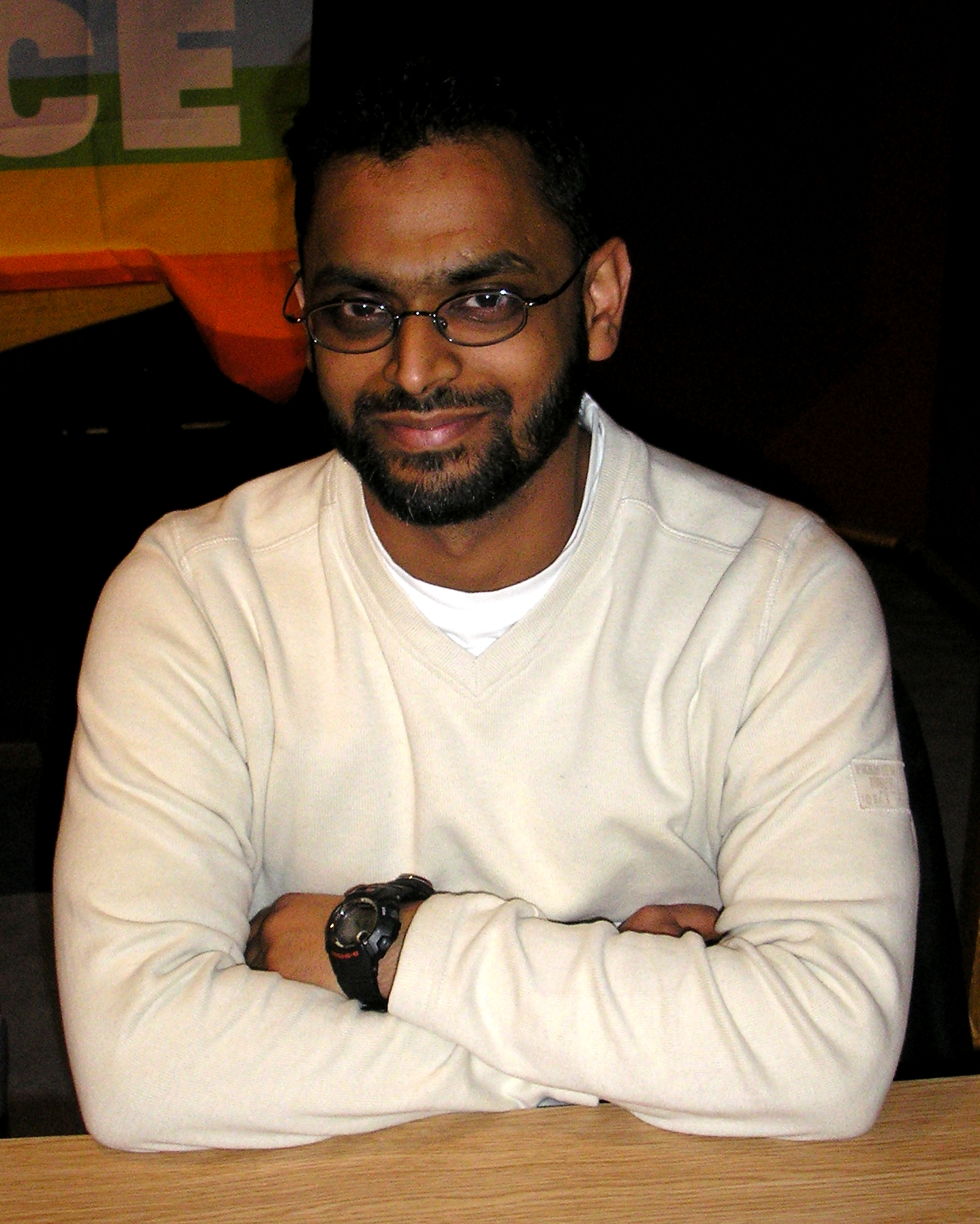
Moazzam Begg

=== Sahgal's public criticism ===
Sahgal joined the staff of Amnesty International in 2002, and became head of its gender unit the following year. She came to public attention in February 2010, after she was quoted by The Sunday Times in an article about Amnesty and suspended by the organization. She had criticised Amnesty for its high-profile associations with Moazzam Begg, the director of Cageprisoners, which represented men in extrajudicial detention. "To be appearing on platforms with Britain’s most famous supporter of the Taliban Begg, whom we treat as a human rights defender, is a gross error of judgment," she said. Sahgal argued that by associating with Begg and Cageprisoners, Amnesty was risking its reputation on human rights. "As a former Guantanamo detainee, it was legitimate to hear his experiences, but as a supporter of the Taliban it was absolutely wrong to legitimise him as a partner", Sahgal said. She said she repeatedly brought the matter up with Amnesty for two years, to no avail. A few hours after the article was published, Sahgal was suspended from her position. Amnesty's Senior Director of Law and Policy, Widney Brown, later said Sahgal raised concerns about Begg and Cageprisoners to her personally for the first time a few days before sharing them with The Sunday Times.

Sahgal issued a statement saying she felt that Amnesty was risking its reputation by associating with and thereby politically legitimising Begg, because Cageprisoners "actively promotes Islamic Right ideas and individuals". She said the issue was not about Begg's "freedom of opinion, nor about his right to propound his views: he already exercises these rights fully as he should. The issue is ... the importance of the human rights movement maintaining an objective distance from groups and ideas that are committed to systematic discrimination and fundamentally undermine the universality of human rights." The controversy prompted responses by politicians, the writer Salman Rushdie, and journalist Christopher Hitchens, among others who criticised Amnesty's association with Begg.

After her suspension and the controversy, Sahgal was interviewed by numerous media and attracted international supporters. She was interviewed on National Public Radio (NPR) on 27 February 2010, where she discussed the activities of Cageprisoners and why she deemed it inappropriate for Amnesty to associate with Begg. She said that Cageprisoners' Asim Qureshi spoke supporting global jihad at a Hizb ut-Tahrir rally. She noted that a best seller at Begg's bookshop was a book by Abdullah Azzam, a mentor of Osama bin Laden and a founder of the terrorist organization Lashkar-e-Taiba.

In a separate interview for the Indian Daily News & Analysis, Sahgal said that, as Qureshi affirmed his support for global jihad on a BBC World Service programme, "these things could have been stated in [Begg's] introduction" with Amnesty. She said that Begg's bookshop had published The Army of Madinah, which she characterised as a jihad manual by Dhiren Barot.

=== Amnesty responses ===
Amnesty responded on its website with a statement by its interim Secretary General, Claudio Cordone:

[Sahgal] was suspended ... for not raising these issues internally... [Begg] speaks about his own views ..., not Amnesty International's... Sometimes the people whose rights we defend may not share each others views–but they all have human rights, and all human rights are worth defending.

Widney Brown of Amnesty also spoke on the NPR program with Sahgal. She said the books sold at his bookstore did not mean that he was not "a legitimate voice on Guantanamo Bay abuses". Responding to the interviewer's observation that Amnesty had sponsored Begg's lecture tours in Europe, she said that because Begg was one of the first detainees released, he was considered important for dispelling Guantanamo Bay's secrecy. Brown said that, as a British citizen, Begg has "an incredibly effective voice in talking to governments in Europe about the importance of" their accepting Guantanamo detainees. She praised Sahgal's work, saying:

There's no question about it. Gita is incredibly intelligent, very strong analysis .... She's done great work for us. And I think the real tragedy of this particular circumstance is by going public in this particular way knowing that we were addressing her issue means that she's maybe undermining her own work in fact.

Amnesty's international secretariat Policy Director, Anne Fitzgerald, when asked if she thought Begg was a human rights advocate, said: "It’s something you’d have to speak to him about. I don’t have the information to answer that".

In April 2010, Amnesty circulated a statement internally, saying:

Due to irreconcilable differences of view over policy between Gita Sahgal and Amnesty International regarding Amnesty International’s relationship with Moazzam Begg and Cageprisoners, it has been agreed that Gita will leave Amnesty International on 9 April 2010.

=== Begg response ===
Begg said of the Taliban: "We need to be engaging with those people who we find most unpalatable. I don’t consider anybody a terrorist until they have been charged and convicted of terrorism".

Begg noted that he worked with groups to empower Muslim women. Sahgal, he says, "has no monopoly on women's rights".

=== Reactions ===
==== Pro-Sahgal ====
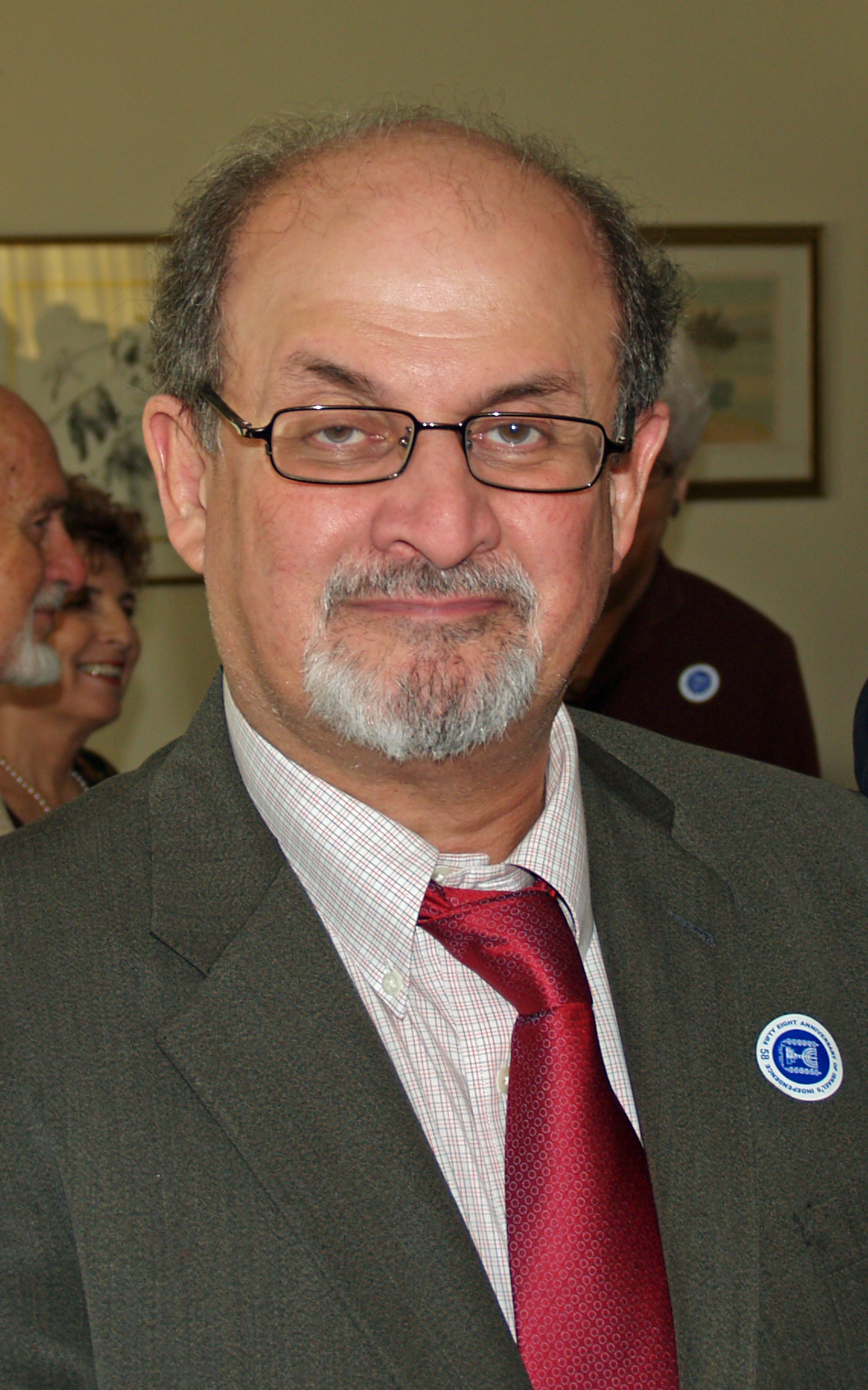
Salman Rushdie

Salman Rushdie said:

Amnesty ... has done its reputation incalculable damage by allying itself with Moazzam Begg and his group Cageprisoners, and holding them up as human rights advocates. It looks very much as if Amnesty's leadership is suffering from a kind of moral bankruptcy, and has lost the ability to distinguish right from wrong. It has greatly compounded its error by suspending the redoubtable Gita Sahgal for the crime of going public with her concerns. Gita Sahgal is a woman of immense integrity and distinction.... It is people like Gita Sahgal who are the true voices of the human rights movement; Amnesty and Begg have revealed, by their statements and actions, that they deserve our contempt.

Denis MacShane, a Member of the British Parliament and former Labour government minister, wrote to Amnesty protesting its suspension of Gita Sahgal: "one of its most respected researchers because she rightly called into question Amnesty’s endorsement of Mozzam Begg whose views on the Taliban and on Islamist jihad stand in total contradiction of everything Amnesty has fought for." He called "Kafkaesque" the fact that Amnesty—"the very organisation meant to defend human rights"—would threaten the career of Sahgal for her having exposed "an ideology that denies human rights".

Writing in The National Post, writer Christopher Hitchens said: "It's well-nigh incredible that Amnesty should give a platform to people who are shady on this question and absolutely disgraceful that it should suspend a renowned employee who gave voice to her deep and sincere misgivings". Writing in The Independent, journalist and human rights activist Joan Smith said "Amnesty's mistake is simple and egregious", and writing in The Spectator, journalist Martin Bright commented: "It is Gita Sahgal who should be the darling of the human rights establishment, not Moazzam Begg". Columnist Melanie Phillips wrote that "her real crime has been to expose the extraordinary sympathy by white 'liberals', committed to 'human rights', for Islamic jihadists—who are committed to the extinction of human rights." The Times wrote: "In an extraordinary inversion of its traditional role, Amnesty has stifled its own still small voice of conscience." Journalist Nick Cohen wrote in The Observer that "Amnesty is living in the make-believe world ... where it thinks that liberals are free to form alliances with defenders of clerical fascists who want to do everything in their power to suppress liberals, most notably liberal-minded Muslims." Antara Dev Sen wrote in Daily News and Analysis: "It was a gutsy stand, given the dread of political correctness that cripples our thought and makes us bend over backwards till we almost topple over. ... Suspending Sahgal was an illiberal knee-jerk response unbecoming of this cherished human rights organisation." Farrukh Dhondy wrote in her support, in The Asian Age, as did The Herald (Scotland), columnist and author Mona Charen in Australia's The Daily Advertiser, commentator Jonathan Power in Dubai's Khaleej Times, journalist and author Terry Glavin in the National Post, Spectator contributor Rod Liddle, columnist Jay Nordlinger in National Review, and David Aaronovitch in a column in The Times entitled "How Amnesty Chose the Wrong Poster-boy". Feminist historian Urvashi Butalia also spoke up in her support. Douglas Murray wrote in The Telegraph that "Amnesty is no longer an organisation worth listening to, let alone supporting", and The Wall Street Journal wrote: "it's a pity that a group that was born to give voice to the victims of oppression should now devote itself to sanitizing the oppressors".

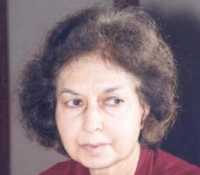
Sahgal's mother, novelist Nayantara Sahgal

Sahgal's mother, Nehru's niece novelist Nayantara Sahgal, said she was proud of Gita:

for her very correct and courageous stand. Gita had been taking up the matter for a couple of years now, but after not having received a response she decided to go public—which was a very brave thing to do.... Amnesty has been supporting Begg, legitimising him, making him a partner and sponsoring his tour of Europe. They should at least have checked his credentials. It simply gives them a bad reputation.

An organisation called Human Rights for All formed in her defence. They have been joined by many notable supporters.

The Observer wrote in April 2010 that Amnesty had faced few stickier periods since it was founded in 1961, and Oliver Kamm wrote in The Times that Amnesty had shown a "grudging and euphemistic explanation for its behaviour" and that "Disastrously for itself and those who depend on its support, Amnesty is no longer the friend of liberty".

==== Mixed ====
Leaked extracts from an internal 10 February 2010 memo by Amnesty's Asia-Pacific director Sam Zarifi, were published by The Sunday Times. In the memo Zarifi said Amnesty had made a mistake in not making it clearer they did not support Begg's views. Zarifi said Amnesty "did not always sufficiently distinguish between the rights of detainees to be free from torture, and the validity of their views", adding that the organisation "did not always clarify that while we champion the rights of all—including terrorism suspects, and more important, victims of terrorism—we do not champion their views". In a subsequent letter to The Sunday Times, Zarifi said he agreed with Amnesty's actions with regard to Sahgal.

Amnesty decided not to hire Begg for their South Asia campaigns, Widney Brown said: "Sam's view was that, no, he was not the right person for [our South Asia campaigns]. He raised the concern, and he was heard."

==== Pro-Begg ====
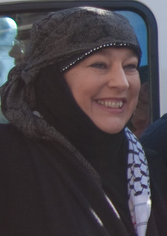
Yvonne Ridley

Yvonne Ridley, a British journalist for Iranian-based English-language news channel Press TV and a Cageprisoners patron, said Begg was being "demonised", and that he was "a great supporter of women and a promoter of their rights".

Co-author of Enemy Combatant, Victoria Brittain wrote: "Ms Sahgal has contributed to the current climate of intolerance and islamophobia in Britain."

Andy Worthington, critic of Guantanamo Bay detention camp, and friend of Begg, also cited Islamophobia, and then defended Begg. He said, "I know from personal experience that Moazzam Begg is no extremist. We have met on numerous occasions, have had several long discussions, and have shared platforms together at many events."

== Select writings ==
=== Book ===
- Refusing holy orders: women and fundamentalism in Britain, co-editor with Nira Yuval-Davis, and contributor, Virago Press (1992), WLUML (2002), ISBN 1-85381-219-6

=== Chapters ===
- Looking at class: film, television and the working class in Britain, Sheila Rowbotham, Huw Beynon, "Chapter: Struggle Not Submission", Rivers Oram Press, 2001, ISBN 1-85489-121-9
- Feminist postcolonial theory: a reader, Reina Lewis, Sara Mills, Chapter: "The Uses of Fundamentalism", with Nira Yuval-Davis, Taylor & Francis, 2003, ISBN 0-415-94275-6
- The situated politics of belonging, Nira Yuval-Davis, Kalpana Kannabirān, Ulrike Vieten, "Chapter: Legislating Utopia? Violence Against Women: Identities and Interventions", SAGE, 2006, ISBN Ch1412921015

== See also ==
- List of Indian writers
- Mandakranta Sen
- Sithara S.
