= Scotland Against Criminalising Communities =

Scotland Against Criminalising Communities (SACC) is a voluntary grassroots organisation that campaigns against Britain's terrorism laws, including detention without charge or trial, and other laws that have the effect of criminalising political activity. SACC works in solidarity with those communities most affected by the anti-terrorism laws and it has also campaigned on a number of other human rights issues closely related to the 'war on terror'. SACC argues that terrorism laws are unnecessary and unjust and crimes connected with terrorism are better dealt with by ordinary criminal law. Richard Haley, SACC's chair, argues that the British government's international politics adversely influences the administration of justice in Scotland.

== Background ==
SACC was established in early 2003 in response to the arrest of Algerian men at Hogmanay in Edinburgh on terrorism charges, which were subsequently dropped.

SACC is affiliated to Britain's Stop the War campaign and endorses the call for UK Troops to come home from Afghanistan immediately. Since its inception SACC has been closely linked to Campaign Against Criminalising Communities (CAMPACC). In 2005 a submission from Ann Alexander, Scotland Against Criminalising Communities appears as Appendix 9 of the twelfth report of session 2005/6 of the UK Joint Committee on Human Rights about the inhumane treatment of 4 men under house arrest (control order) in the south of England. SACC campaigns against the use of extended detention without charge or trial in the UK and overseas and, controversially, its website provides postal details of prisoners so held in order that individuals can write to them.

SACC is also affiliated to Unite Against Fascism (UAF) and a number of other organisations. Cageprisoners is a human rights group that SACC regularly works with and together they organised the Scottish leg of a speaking tour, Two Sides One Story, by two former Guantanamo detainees Moazzam Begg, Omar Deghayes and a former Guantanamo guard Christopher Arendt. The tour was arranged to highlight that more needed to be done to encourage President Obama to honour his failed pledge to close Guantanamo and other black sites where people are allegedly rendered and tortured.

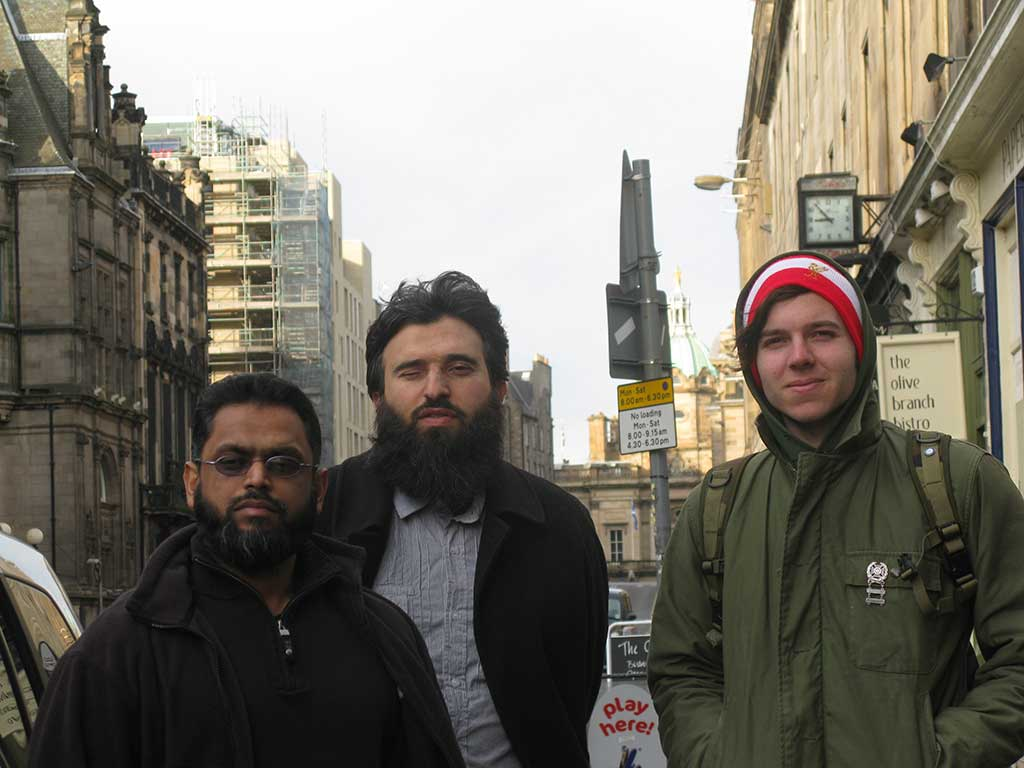
Moazzam Begg, Omar Deghayes, Chris Arendt, Two Sides One Story in Edinburgh 2009

== Campaigns ==
Scottish campaigning lawyer Aamer Anwar, was supported by SACC when he was tried and later acquitted for contempt of court because of a statement he made on the steps of the High Court in Edinburgh on behalf of his client Mohammed Atif Siddique at the end of a terrorism trial Mohammed Atif Siddique's case was highlighted by SACC and his appeal was eventually successful and he walked free from the High Court in February 2010.

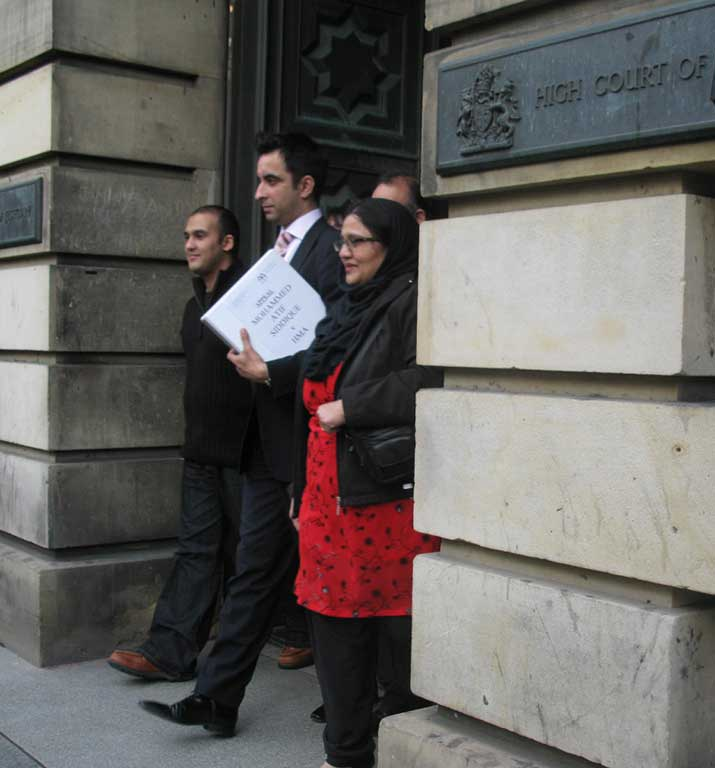
Atif Siddique walks free after his successful appeal to the High Court in Edinburgh

The alleged CIA Aircraft flying into Scotland that were linked to extraordinary rendition has been other of SACC's campaign issues. Together with Andy Worthington, Omar Deghayes and Aamer Anwar, SACC showcased the documentary film by Polly Nash 'Outside the Law' in March 2010 in Edinburgh and Glasgow.

The next Scottish Census in 2011 involves contract for work by CACI Ltd and SACC hosted an online petition that called for the contract to be cancelled as CACI Ltd's parent company CACI International has ongoing litigation in the United States by Center for Constitutional Rights based around torture allegations in relation to a former interrogation contract at Abu Graib prison in Iraq. Two SACC members received a threatening letter from the lawyers of CACI International to remove the allegations that the company was involved in torture in Iraq from the SACC website. SACC mad no change to their statement and no legal action followed.

CAMPACC (2005) states that: 'The ‘War on Terror' promotes a racist culture of suspicion towards migrant and Muslim communities. It generates and manipulates public fears to justify a perpetual state of war.'. In particular, according to SACC, the banning of organisations, such as the Kurdish Workers Party (PKK), in UK can only foment discontent within communities like the British Kurds and so, in December 2009, SACC appealed to the Scottish Justice Minister, Kenny MacKaskill to write to the Turkish authorities to ask them to allow Mr Ocalan, the ex-head of the PKK to act as an intermediary for a peaceful resolution to the problems of the Kurdish population in Turkey. In January 2010, over 150 Kurds from civil society were arrested in Turkey and their trials began in October 2010.

Lord Carlile's review of the definition of terrorism for the UK government in 2006 received a submission from SACC. Subsequently, Arun Kundani from the Institute for Race Relations (IRR) produced a research report on the UK government's Preventing Violent Extremism policy and SACC produced a briefing of the UK Prevent strategy from a Scottish perspective. More recently, the new UK Government (Conservative-Liberal Democrat coalition) called from submissions to its review of some aspects of the terrorism legislation and SACC submitted a response on 5 October 2010.
