= Enemy Combatant (book) =

Memoir by Moazzam Begg with Victoria Brittain

- First UK edition
- Author: Moazzam Begg, Victoria Brittain
- Language: English
- Publisher: New Press (US); Free Press (UK)
- Publication date: 2006
- ISBN: 0-7432-8567-0 (Britain); ISBN 0-7432-8567-0 (US)

Enemy Combatant is a memoir by British Muslim, Moazzam Begg, co-written by Victoria Brittain, former associate foreign editor for The Guardian, about Begg's detention by the government of the United States of America in Bagram Detention Facility and at Camp Echo, Guantanamo Bay and his life prior to that detention. It was published in Britain as Enemy Combatant: A British Muslim's Journey To Guantanamo and Back (ISBN 0-7432-8567-0), and in the US as Enemy Combatant: My Imprisonment at Guantanamo, Bagram, and Kandahar (ISBN 1-59558-136-7). In the US, the foreword was written by David Ignatius of The Washington Post.

Begg was seized by Pakistani intelligence officers at his home in Islamabad in February 2002, turned over to U.S. agents who transferred him to the detention centre at Bagram, and later to Guantanamo Bay, and after prolonged sessions of interrogation, and two years of solitary confinement, he was released without charge nearly three years later on 25 January 2005. According to statements made by the U.S. military, Begg was an enemy combatant and al-Qaeda member, who recruited others, provided money and support to al-Qaeda training camps, received extensive military training in al-Qaeda-run terrorist training camps in Afghanistan, and who was prepared to fight U.S. or allied troops.

Begg admits having spent time at two non-al-Qaeda training camps in Afghanistan in the 1990s, having supported Muslim fighters in Bosnia and Chechnya, and that he had "thought about" taking up arms in Chechnya. Also, that he had previously met people who have since been linked to terrorism (Khalil al-Deek, Dhiren Barot, and Shahid Akram Butt), but he denies ever having trained for, aided, carried out or planned any acts of terrorism.

John Sifton, a New York–based official from Human Rights Watch, said that the book's narrative is consistent with other accounts of conditions in Afghan detention centres and Guantanamo Bay.

== Critical reception ==
Enemy Combatant received praise in Britain. American critic Jonathan Raban summarized this praise in The New York Review of Books as resulting from Begg’s "outstanding liberality of mind and evenhandedness toward his captors". Writing in The Guardian, Philippe Sands said that the book's "humour and warmth are striking", and recommended that it be read by American politicians such as George Bush and Dick Cheney. In The Independent, Yasmin Alibhai-Brown compared the book to the "Holocaust testimonies" of Primo Levi and Rabbi Hugo Gryn, saying that Begg "writes with the same authenticity and conveys horror without hyperbole".

The book received mixed reviews in the US. Publishers Weekly described it as "a fast-paced, harrowing narrative". Jonathan Raban criticized the dialogue and called the gaps in Begg's story "frustrating," noting that they seemed to stop after Begg was incarcerated. He ultimately concluded that although the book was poorly written, it did not impact his belief in Begg's overall experience as a detainee. The New York Times reported "some notable gaps in Mr. Begg's memoir", such as not mentioning his arrest in 1994 for alleged fraud. U-T San Diego had similar concerns about Begg's ties to terrorist organizations and his later "cooperation with interrogators".

The Muslim News called it an "open, honest and touching account". Begg earned the "Published Writer Award" for the book, at the annual Muslim Writers Awards in March 2008.

== See also ==
- Persons held as enemy combatants
- Shaker Aamer
