= 2004 financial buildings plot =

Planned terrorist attack

The 2004 financial buildings plot was a plan led by Dhiren Barot to attack a number of targets in the U.S. and the United Kingdom which is believed to have been approved by al-Qaeda. The evidence against the plotters consisted of home videos, written notes, and files on computers. At the time of the arrests the group had no funding, vehicles, or access to bomb-making equipment.

All eight suspects pleaded guilty in a British court; Barot was sentenced to 40 years in jail. The trials of seven co-defendants began in April 2007 and in June 2007 these seven were sentenced to a total of 136 years in prison.

== Plot and evidence ==
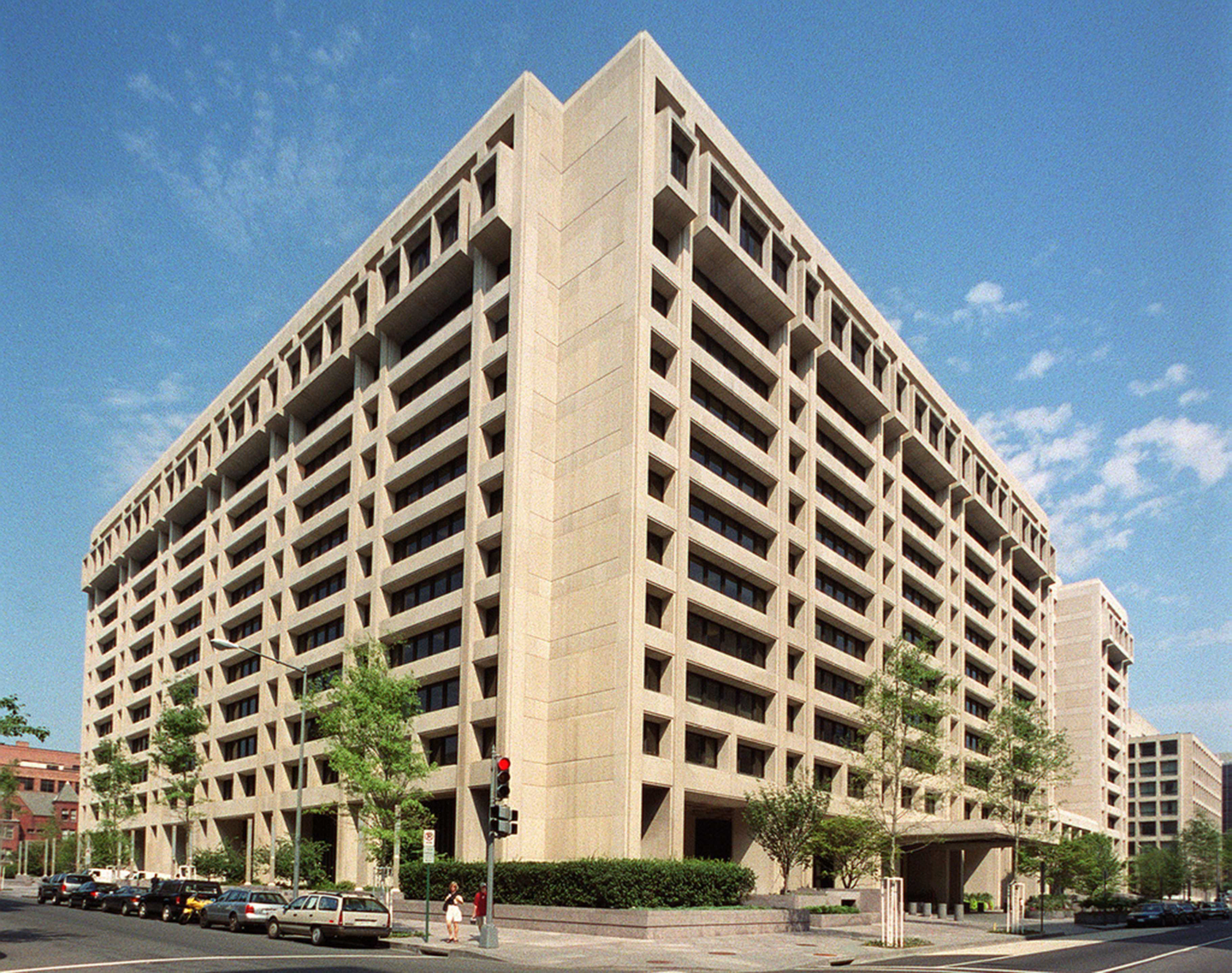
IMF Headquarters in Washington, D.C.

The plots which were uncovered were in the form of proposals found on a laptop seized in Pakistan, notebooks and videos found in the possession of the suspects after their arrests, and in deleted files on a hard disk. Although Barot had been under surveillance since 15 June 2004, a counter-terrorism source admitted that there was little or no admissible evidence against him at the time of his arrest on 3 August 2004.

=== Plan to blow up financial buildings in the U.S. ===
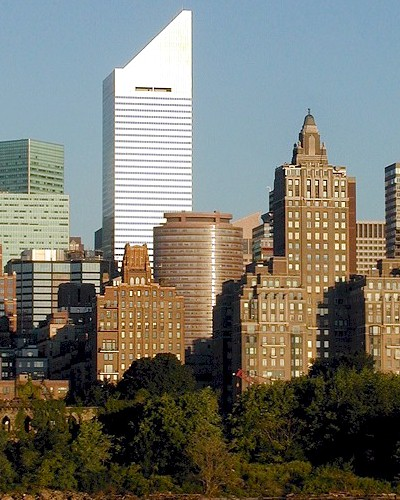
The Citigroup Center in Manhattan, New York City

The plan was formulated by Barot while he was in New York posing as a student in 2000 and 2001 prior to the 11 September attacks, of which he apparently had no foreknowledge. Barot's targets were the International Monetary Fund and World Bank buildings in Washington, D.C.; the New York Stock Exchange and Citigroup buildings in New York City; and the Prudential headquarters in Newark, New Jersey.

He wrote a series of detailed reports describing the importance of the targets, the outlines of the buildings, and the logistics of mounting an explosive attack. He also visited and filmed them from the street in a series of short clips that were discovered in the middle of a copy of the movie Die Hard. The images of this evidence have been posted on the web.

The plans appeared to have been shelved after the successful al-Qaeda attacks on those cities on 11 September.

There is strong skepticism in several quarters regarding whether any of these plots could have gone ahead without arousing suspicion, or were even superficially viable. For instance, no terrorist bombmakers have succeeded in using commercial gas cylinders to collapse a building.

=== "Gas limos" project ===
The most detailed plan was to pack three stretch limousines with commercially available gas canisters and park them in an underground carpark (where a truck bomb wouldn't have fit) for the purpose of inflicting "mass damage and chaos".

No targets were given, but there were indications that hotels and mainline train stations were being considered.

=== "Dirty bomb using smoke detectors" project ===
Barot's proposals for his dirty bomb project were inspired by a road accident in France involving a truck carrying 900 smoke detectors, which caused concern over possible exposure to the radio-active material contained in them. Barot formulated a plan involving 10,000 smoke detectors either set on fire or placed on top of an explosive device, and worked out a budget requiring £50,000 for material (£5 for each smoke detector) and £20,000 for storage. Calculations suggest that this would have the volume of four telephone boxes and contain only trace quantities of radioactivity.

According to expert evidence supplied by the prosecution during his trial, it could have contaminated as many as 500 people but was unlikely to have caused any deaths.

== Arrests ==
A group of fourteen men, called the "Luton cell", were arrested in the UK in the Luton area on 3 August 2004. Barot was arrested while having his hair cut in a barber shop in north London. It is believed that the timing of the arrests was driven by the leaking of the identity of Muhammad Naeem Noor Khan, an alleged Al Qaeda double agent and computer expert, to The New York Times the previous day.

== Trial ==
On 17 August 2004, two weeks after the arrests, eight men: Barot, Mohammed Naveed Bhatti, Abdul Aziz Jalil, Omar Abdul Rehman, Junade Feroze, Zia-ul-Haq, Qaisar Shaffi, and Nadeem Tarmohammed, were charged variously with conspiracy to murder; conspiracy to commit a public nuisance by the use of radioactive materials, toxic gases, chemicals and or explosives; and possessing a document or record of information of a kind likely to be useful to a person committing or preparing an act of terrorism. Barot was seen as the leader of the group, identified as the individual called "Britani" who "Osama bin Laden had sent to the United States 'to case potential economic and Jewish targets in New York City' for possible attack." Five of the men were released without charge. Matthew Monks was charged with possession of a prohibited weapon, thought to be a Brocock air pistol, and released on bail.

The group had no funding, vehicles or bomb-making equipment, however the incriminating documents included reconnaissance plans of the buildings in the U.S., two notebooks containing information on explosives, poisons, chemicals and related matters, and an extract of the Terrorist's Handbook, all classed as "information likely to be useful to a person committing or preparing an act of terrorism" under the Terrorism Act 2000.

=== Sentencing ===
On 12 October 2006, Barot pleaded guilty in a UK court to "conspiring to murder people in terrorist campaigns in Britain and the US", and on 7 November 2006, he was sentenced to life in prison and told he must serve at least 40 years. The sentence was reduced to 30 years in 2007 on appeal. In 2006, he was reported as being locked-down for 19 hours a day in Belmarsh Prison.

On 15 June 2007, Jalil, from Luton, was jailed for 26 years, Feroze, from Blackburn, for 22 years. Bhatti, from Harrow and Tarmohamed from Willesden, both in north-west London, were sentenced to 20 years each. Ul Haq, from Paddington, west London, was given 18 years, while Rehman, from Bushey Hertfordshire, and Shaffi, from Willesden, were given 15 years each.

== US charges ==
On 12 April 2005, the U.S. authorities brought charges against three of the men, Dhiren Barot (also known as Esa al-Hindi), Nadeem Tarmohamed, and Qaisar Shaffi. The indictment accused Barot of being at a jihad training camp in Afghanistan in 1998 and of doing surveillance of targets in the U.S. between 2000 and 2001 while posing as a student. It accused all three men of conspiracy to use weapons of mass destruction to damage and destroy buildings used in interstate and foreign commerce. When pressed by reporters on the lack of any allegations of a connection to al Qaeda in the indictment in spite of earlier reports that tied Barot directly to the 11 September 2001 attacks, Deputy Attorney General James Comey said, "I didn't say there is no connection to al Qaeda. I said we have not alleged a connection to al Qaeda in this indictment."
