= Andrew Knight (journalist) =

English Journalist and editor (born 1939)

Andrew Stephen Bower Knight (born 1 November 1939 in England) is an English journalist, editor, and director of News Corporation.

== Early life ==
Andrew Knight was born on 1 November 1939 to Group Captain M. W. B. Knight DFC and his wife S. E. F. Knight. Group Captain Knight was a decorated officer with the RAF, noted for founding Squadron 485, the New Zealand Squadron. He was educated at the Roman Catholic school Ampleforth College, where he was appointed Head boy, and was awarded an Exhibition to Balliol College, Oxford (MA, Modern history).

Knight worked at the City of London merchant bankers J. Henry Schroder Wagg from 1961 to 1963, and the Investors Chronicle from 1962 until 1966, when he joined The Economist magazine.

== Career ==
Knight was first assigned to The Economist's international business and investment sections. From March 1968 to April 1970 he served in the Washington offices of the paper, before returning to Europe to establish its European section and, in 1973, its offices in Brussels.

Knight was named Editor of The Economist in October 1974. Aged 34, he was the second-youngest editor in the magazine's history, and tripled the magazine's circulation during his 11 years at the helm. He remained editor until 1986, and was named International Editor of the Year by World Press Review in June 1981.

He organised the takeover of the then floundering Telegraph Group in 1985, including The Daily Telegraph newspaper. Knight approached Conrad Black for financing of the takeover, and controversially appointed Max Hastings, a historian and former BBC journalist, as editor of The Daily Telegraph. Knight was Chief Executive and Editor-in-Chief of the London Daily Telegraph Group from January 1986 until October 1989.

In March 1990, Knight joined News International plc as chairman. Rupert Murdoch named Knight as his "backstop and successor" at News Corporation, prior to Knight retiring from an executive position in June 1994, after a near-fatal skiing accident. He was appointed a Director of News Corporation on 31 January 1991 and became a non-executive director in 1994.

In July 2008, it was announced that Knight had resigned from the board of the Rothschild Investment Trust (RIT), on which he had served since 1996, and had instead taken over as Chairman of J. Rothschild Capital Management Limited, RIT's main operating entity. He is a former member of the Steering Committee of the Bilderberg Group.

Knight resigned from the board of News Corporation in 2012, and was elected the Chairman of Times Newspapers Holdings Ltd, a post previously held by Rupert Murdoch.

== Personal life ==
In 1966, Knight married Victoria Brittain, by whom he had a son. After a divorce, he married Sanghata Global charitable organisation founder Sabiha Rumani Malik in 1975, with whom he has two daughters, one of whom is designer Amaryllis Knight, and one stepdaughter, India Knight. They divorced in 1991. In 2006, Andrew Knight married for the third time, his third wife being Marita Crawley, who has three children by her first marriage.

== Positions held ==
- Chairman, Times Newspaper Holdings Ltd (2012–present)
- Chairman, J. Rothschild Capital Management Limited
- Member of the Board of News Corporation (1991–2012)
- non-executive director, Chairman of Compensation Committee and Member of Audit Committee of News Corporation (1991–present)
- Director and Member of Audit Committee of Reader's Digest Association Inc. (2007–present)
- non-executive director of Templeton Emerging Markets Investment Trust plc (2003–present)
- Former non-executive director, Member of Audit Committee, Member of Nominations Committee and Member of Remuneration & Conflicts Committee RIT Capital Partners plc (1996–present)
- Chairman, News International plc (1990–94)
- CEO, Editor-in-Chief of The Daily Telegraph Group (1986–89)
- Editor in Chief of The Economist (1974–86)
- Brussels Office of The Economist (1973–74)
- Established the European Section of The Economist (1970–73)
- Washington Office of The Economist (1968–70)
- Investors Chronicle (1962–66)
- J. Henry Schroder Wagg (1961–63)
- Member of the Board of Reuters
- Member of the Board of Tandem Computers

=== Cultural and educational institutions, charities ===
- Chairman of Shipston Home Nursing
- Chairman of the Harlech Scholars' Trust
- Governor of the Ditchley Foundation
- Member of the Council of Management of the Ditchley Foundation
- Advisory Board of the Centre of Economic Policy Research at Stanford University, California
- Advisory Council of the Institute of International Studies, Stanford University
- Council member of the Brain and Spine Foundation

=== Former positions ===
- non-executive director of Reuters Holdings plc and of Tandem Computers Inc.
- Former Director of BSkyB from 1990 to 1994
- Overseer of the Hoover Institution, Stanford
- Former Chairman of the Ballet Rambert
- Former Trustee of the Victoria and Albert Museum
- Former Governor of Imperial College of Science & Technology
- Former Council member of the Royal Institute of International Affairs Chatham House
- Former Council member of Templeton College, Oxford University
- Former Governor of Gordonstoun school, Scotland
- Former Chairman of the Jerwood Charity Jerwood Foundation
- Former Director of the UK charity Mariinsky Theatre Trust (working name of the Anglo-Russian Opera and Ballet Trust)

Media offices
| Preceded by Alastair Burnet | Editor of The Economist; 1974–1986 | Succeeded by Rupert Pennant-Rea |
