= Phantom Parrot =

2023 documentary film by Kate Stonehill

- Directed by: Kate Stonehill
- Produced by: Steven Lake
- Cinematography: Matt Bockelman; JP Lewis; Ronnie McQuillan; Kate Stonehill
- Edited by: Vera Simmonds, Emiliano Battista
- Music by: Nainita Desai
- Production company: Brass Mill Media
- Distributed by: Rubix Films
- Release dates: March 2023 (CPH:DOX); 15 March 2024
- Running time: 89 minutes
- Country: United Kingdom

Phantom Parrot is a 2023 documentary film that documents the ordeal of Muhammad Rabbani when he is arrested at the UK border. It was directed by Kate Stonehill.

Phantom Parrot tells the story of Muhammad Rabbani, a human rights activist who works with people who have been subject to torture and other human rights violations. Rabbani is stopped at the border and asked for the passwords of his electronic devices. Rabbani refuses to give up his passwords and so is arrested under Schedule 7 of the Terrorism Act 2000. Rabbani is the director of CAGE (organisation), who fight against mass surveillance in the wake of the war on terror. During the film, we learn that Rabbani's stop may have been targeted, as he had documents on his devices relating to individuals who had been tortured and mistreated by the American government. The film explores how individuals can be arrested and imprisoned simply for protecting data that relates to human rights violations.

The title Phantom Parrot refers to a government programme called Phantom Parrot, that was first discovered in a leaked document by Edward Snowden. The policy allows for targeted stopping of people at the border, under Schedule 7 of the Terrorism Act, to download data from their devices.
