= Lynx gang =

British gang

- Founding location: Sparkhill, Birmingham, England
- Territory: Birmingham
- Ethnicity: Mostly British Pakistani (Mirpuri)
- Criminal activities: hooliganism, robbery, extortion
- Rivals: NaziSkinheads Firms, NaziHooligans Firms

The Lynx Gang (sometimes known as The Lynx Crew) was a Birmingham-based gang originally of British Pakistani members that was founded in the 1970s, initially to protect the British Pakistani community (most notably of Mirpuri), from White power skinheads.

The gang was founded in the Sparkhill area of the city. Moazzem Begg is a former member of the unofficial junior version of the gang.
