= Muhammad Naeem Noor Khan =

Alleged Al-Qaeda operative

Muhammad Naeem Noor Khan (Urdu: محمد نعيم نور خان, born 1979, died 2020) was an alleged Al-Qaeda operative and computer expert. Arrested in Pakistan on 13 July 2004, files found on his laptop contained details of a terrorist plot to attack U.S. financial buildings and locations in the UK, including Heathrow Airport.

Khan's arrest was attributed to leads arising from the arrest of Musaad Aruchi a month earlier. Following his arrest, Khan agreed to cooperate with investigators, and continued to communicate with Al-Qaeda as part of a sting operation.

Following the publication of Khan's name, British authorities moved quickly to arrest 13 members of the British terrorist cell with which Khan had been communicating (the so-called Luton cell). Evidence gathering may not have yet been completed and other plotters may have escaped due to the need to make the arrests quickly.

On 14 July 2005, ABC News revealed that Mohammad Sidique Khan, one of the suspected perpetrators of the 7 July London bombings, had been in contact with members of the Luton cell that was broken up.

Khan was an alumnus of NED University and Adamjee Science College in Karachi.

== Identity leaked ==
On 2 August 2004, the New York Times published Khan's name, stating that "An account provided by a Pakistani intelligence official made clear that the crucial capture in recent weeks had been that of Mr. Khan."

Conversely, on 8 August 2004 on CNN's Late Edition with Wolf Blitzer, National Security Advisor Condoleezza Rice told Wolf Blitzer that Khan's name had been revealed "on background" (an expression with no fixed meaning in journalism, but which is often understood to mean that the information may not be published, or at least that the source may not be revealed); afterwards, however, when the transcript of the background briefing revealed that Khan had not in fact been identified by name, Rice's office retracted the statement. Sean McCormack, a National Security Council spokesman, stated "She was in the middle of making a point and [Blitzer] interrupted her, and she reflexively repeated 'on background,' but she was not confirming it and went on to complete her thought."

Precisely who leaked Khan's name, and why, was controversial. Critics of the Bush administration accused them of damaging national security by the deliberate "outing" of an undercover operative for political reasons, i.e. in order to bolster claims of terrorist threats in August 2004 and win support in the upcoming election. This view was supported by anonymous Pakistani sources; according to Reuters,

U.S. officials providing justification for anti-terrorism alerts revealed details about a Pakistani secret agent, and confirmed his name while he was working under cover in a sting operation, Pakistani sources said on Friday. A Pakistani intelligence source told Reuters Mohammad Naeem Noor Khan, who was arrested in Lahore secretly last month, had been actively cooperating with intelligence agents to help catch al Qaeda operatives when his name appeared in U.S. newspapers.

Writing for Salon.com, however, Husain Haqqani countered this view, reporting that

in fact, U.S. officials did not leak Khan's name. The first leak of Khan's name, according to well-informed, reliable sources in the region who spoke on condition of anonymity, came from Pakistani officials in Islamabad – who perhaps were motivated by eagerness to show off their success in arresting al-Qaida figures or, more ominously, by a desire to sabotage the penetration of al-Qaida that Khan's arrest had made possible. A second Pakistani leak to Reuters, blaming the Americans as the source of the leak, served to absolve the Pakistanis of any responsibility in breaking up new al-Qaida cells – an important move domestically.

Dawn reported on 14 August 2004 that the Pakistani government had "lodged a protest with the US government for leaking the name of Mr. Khan to the media as he was said to be actively cooperating with Pakistani intelligence agencies to help catch Al Qaeda operatives."

Most analysts agreed that, regardless of who had leaked Khan's identity, the leak had been premature and had compromised the success of the intelligence operation. Following the publication of Khan's name, British authorities moved quickly to arrest 13 members of the British terrorist cell with which Khan had been communicating (the so-called Luton cell). By the evening of 9 August, two of the suspects had been released from custody, and the interviews of two others had been called off. An additional five suspects were reported as having escaped the British raids.

Some of those who still maintained that the Bush administration had leaked Khan's name went on to link the incident to the leak of Valerie Plame's name as denoting a pattern of compromising intelligence operatives for political gain. Aside from individuals, blogs, and online petitions, these included other sources, such as The Village Voice, The Advocate Weekly Newspapers, Scoop, and The Democratic Policy Committee.

Sajeel Abu Ibrahim, a British Muslim widely described as a founder or leader of an organization of British Muslims who supported or engaged in Jihad, said he befriended Noor Khan when they were held in Lahore. According to BBC News Shahid said "Nur Khan deceived all the fundamentalists in prison and informed on fundamentalist cells around the world."

== Released due to lack of evidence ==
On 21 August 2007 BBC News reported that Khan had been released due to lack of evidence.

== Death ==
In January 2024, al-Qaeda announced that Khan was killed by American forces in Ghazni Province, Afghanistan in 2020.
