= Rendition: Guantanamo =

- Developer: T-Enterprise
- Platforms: Microsoft Windows, Xbox 360
- Release: Cancelled
- Genre: Action
- Mode: Unknown

Rendition: Guantanamo was a video game being developed by T-Enterprise, a software company in Scotland. It had been scheduled for release in late 2009, but was ultimately cancelled. The promotional material used the slogan, "It's time to fight back."

Company director Zarrar Chishti, quoted in Scotland's Sunday Mail said in 2009: "It's been in production for a year and two months. The player start the game with the orange boiler suit, cuffs and ear muffs. There are certain rules we can't break after meeting politicians so we are not making the game too extreme. We have had a lot of hate mail about this, mainly from America, saying things like, 'Don't dare put out a game that shows them killing our soldiers.' But no US or British soldiers get killed in it. The only ones being killed are mercenaries. We have set it in January 2010 because that's when we think the camp will be closed. We are making a statement. We did not want Guantanamo to be forgotten."

== Cancellation ==
The game was cancelled citing "inaccurate" details posted on various websites detailing about the game and the "extreme reaction that the game and its popular misconceptions have provoked." Zarrar Chishti, the director at T-Enterprise, wrote an official statement on June 3 regarding the cancellation of Rendition: Guantanamo on the game's official website, which previously showed the teaser trailer for the game. He claims that the main character was not going to be Moazzam Begg, an actual detainee of the Guantanamo Bay detention camp, but was instead going to be a man named Adam. He also states no American or British soldiers would be killed, but instead the institution would be run by mercenaries.

Chishti states "T-Enterprise is against all forms of terrorism and would never seek to advocate otherwise. Furthermore, Guantanamo was to be a mercenary run institution and so there would have been NO American military personnel killed within the game. Again, we support the British and American troops that fight the war against terrorism to make the world a safer place and would not make a game that said otherwise."

The game company was also claimed to be working with Al-Qaeda, which Chishti repudiates saying, "Having clarified our position on terrorism, I would now like to refute all suggestions that the game was in any way linked to Al Qaeda. T-Enterprise has never had and would never have a link to Al Qaeda in any way, shape or form."
