= India Knight =

British journalist and author (born 1965)

- Born: Gisèle Aertsens; 14 December 1965 (age 60); Brussels, Belgium
- Occupations: Journalist, columnist, novelist
- Children: 3

India Knight (née Gisèle Aertsens; born 14 December 1965) is a British journalist and author. She writes for British newspapers, and has written the books: My Life on a Plate, Don't You Want Me?, The Shops, Neris and India's Idiot-Proof Diet and The Thrift Book (2008). Her novels have been translated into 28 languages.

== Early life ==
She was born to Sabiha Rumani Malik (born 1948) (of a family related to Maulana Abul Kalam Azad, one of the leaders of the Indian independence movement and a scholar and poet) and Michel Robert Georges Aertsens (1927–2002), the son of First World War hero Gaston Aertsens and Marie-Louise Lacroix, of the family of Belgian statesman Henri Jaspar. At the time of India's birth Malik was 17 years old while Aertsens was 20 years Malik's senior. India's parents separated soon after her birth; India went on to live in Brussels with her mother who, whilst continuing her studies, worked as a translator to support her daughter and herself.

India's mother married Andrew Knight, editor of The Economist, in 1975; at the age of 9, India moved to London to live with her mother and stepfather. At 13, she changed her name by deed poll to India Knight, choosing the name to reflect her mother's Asian heritage alongside her stepfather's surname. Her mother and stepfather were married for 17 years and had two daughters, Amaryllis and Afsaneh. They were divorced in 1991, and soon after, India's mother married a family friend, architect Norman Foster; they remained married until 1995. In her semi-autobiographical novel Comfort and Joy, Knight writes about her family and her mother.

In a newspaper interview in 2000, Knight stated that in England she was educated at the French Lycée and Wycombe Abbey both of which she was expelled from. She later won an exhibition to read Modern and Medieval Languages at Trinity College, Cambridge.

== Personal life ==
Her first marriage was to Jeremy Langmead, former editor of Wallpaper* magazine and Esquire magazine. The couple have two sons. When they divorced, they lived in houses a few doors apart in Primrose Hill.

Her third child's father is author Andrew O'Hagan.

In December 2015 she announced her forthcoming marriage to former Labour MP Eric Joyce, her boyfriend of six years. Knight lives in Suffolk with Joyce and her daughter. On 6 November 2018, Joyce was arrested and charged with downloading child abuse images. It was reported that Joyce had a 51-second, Category A - the most serious there is - film on a device that showed the sexual abuse of seven "very young children", the youngest aged twelve months. He was sentenced to eight months in prison suspended for two years.

Controversial British journalist Julie Burchill described Knight as "fake honest", noting that she "displays almost every aspect of her private life in a Sunday paper, but has never tackled the fascinating topic of what makes a woman decide to stay with a convicted viewer of the worst grade of child pornography - which she has."

== Political views ==
In August 2014, Knight was one of 200 public figures who were signatories to a letter to The Guardian opposing Scottish independence in the run-up to September's referendum on that issue.

== Books ==
=== Fiction ===
- My Life on a Plate (2000)
- Don't You Want Me? (2002)
- Comfort and Joy (2010)
- Mutton (2012)
- Darling (2022) - an updating of The Pursuit of Love by Nancy Mitford

=== Non-fiction ===
- The Shops (2003)
- The Dirty Bits For Girls (editor, 2006)
- Neris and India's Idiot-Proof Diet (2007)
- Neris and India's Idiot-Proof Diet Cookbook (2008)
- The Thrift Book: Live Well and Spend Less (2008)
- Home. How to Love It, Live in It and Find Joy in It (2025)

=== Children's books ===
- The Baby (2007)
