= Cage (organisation) =

London-based human rights advocacy organisation

Cage International
- Formation: October 2003
- Type: Human rights advocacy organisation with a focus on Muslim detainees
- Purpose: To raise awareness around the plight of detainees held as part of the war on terror and related human rights concerns, and "empower communities impacted by the war on terror"
- Headquarters: London, England
- Director: Adnan Siddiqui
- Website: www.cage.ngo
- Formerly called: Cageprisoners

Cage International is a London-based human rights advocacy organisation which aims to empower communities impacted by the war on terror. Cage highlights and campaigns against state policies developed as part of the war on terror. The organisation was formed to raise awareness of the plight of detainees held at Guantánamo Bay and elsewhere and related human rights concerns, and has worked closely with former detainees held by the United States and campaigns on behalf of current detainees held without trial. Cage was formerly known as Cageprisoners, and was ordinarily styled as "CAGE".

Human rights groups have said that Cage is doing vital work. Cage has faced criticism due to some of the people it has worked with and some of its public statements. Critics argue that the group sometimes seems to support or excuse extremist figures and positions instead of clearly rejecting them.

== Activities ==
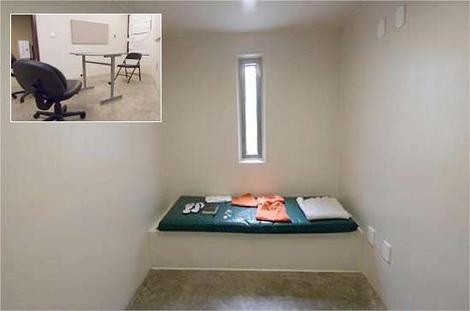
The cell in which a Guantánamo Bay prisoner was detained. Inset is the prisoners' reading room

Cage offers support to those denied due process regarding terrorism offences through casework, advocacy and research. The organisation also documents miscarriages of justice. Cage helps Muslims who have been subjected to torture, harassment and other abuses, by informing them of their rights and putting them in touch with lawyers. Cage has also campaigned for the release of hostages held by the Islamic State.

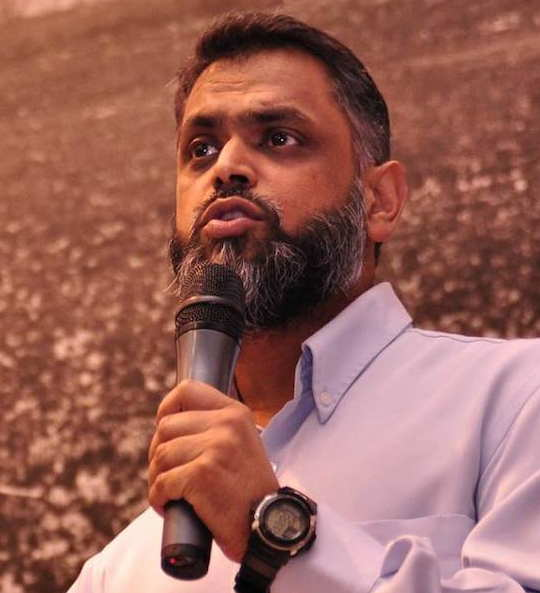
CAGE outreach director, Moazzam Begg

Cage's outreach director, Moazzam Begg, is a Briton from Birmingham who was held for three years by the United States government in extrajudicial detention as a suspected enemy combatant at Bagram in Afghanistan, and the Guantánamo Bay detainment camp in Cuba. He was released without charge in 2005. He has worked to represent detainees still held at Guantánamo, as well as to help former detainees re-integrate into society. He has also been working with governments to persuade them to accept non-national former detainees, some of whom have been refused entry by their countries of origin. Begg has played a crucial role in proving UK complicity in US imprisonment and torture in Bagram and elsewhere, and aided detainees seeking admission and compensation from the UK government.

== History ==
Cage's website was launched in October 2003. It was among the leading organisations which worked on publicising the names of the detainees at Guantanamo. Due to the U.S. government's refusal to publish a list of names until a Freedom of Information lawsuit in 2006, it published names, photos and other information about detainees obtained from detainees' families. The U.S. government's refusal impeded the efforts of lawyers who had wished to represent the detainees there. Cage was formerly Cageprisoners Ltd, and is sometimes styled as "CAGE".

After Anwar al-Awlaki's release from Yemeni detention in 2007, Cage invited the cleric to address their Ramadan fundraising dinners in August 2008 (at Wandsworth Civic Centre, South London, by videolink, as he was banned from entering the UK) and August 2009 at Kensington Town Hall.

As of 2025, it was generally known as CAGE International and it operated in over twenty countries.

== Charitable funding ==
Between 2007 and 2014, the Joseph Rowntree Charitable Trust gave grants to Cage totalling £271,250. In a similar period, the Roddick Foundation, founded by Anita Roddick, gave grants totalling £120,000. In 2015, following pressure from the UK government's Charity Commission, both entities agreed to cease funding Cage. The Charity Commission had said that "Given the nature of [Cage’s] work, and the controversy it has attracted, the Charity Commission has been concerned that such funding risked damaging public trust and confidence in charity".

The Rowntree Trust said the Charity Commission had applied "acute regulatory pressure" and had threatened to institute an exhaustive investigation into the Trust if it refused to stop funding CAGE. The Trust stated that "We believe (Cage) has played an important role in highlighting the ongoing abuses at Guantanamo Bay and at many other sites around the world, including many instances of torture". Cage said that the majority of their income comes from private individuals and that the group "would continue its work regardless of the criticism levelled at it ... even though we aren't a proselytizing organisation, we are a Muslim response to a problem that largely affects Muslims".

In October 2015, following an application for judicial review by Cage, the Charity Commission changed its position and said it would not in future interfere in the discretion of charities to choose to fund Cage. The judicial review heard evidence that Theresa Villiers, a British Cabinet Minister, and US intelligence had both applied pressure on the charity commission to investigate Cage, with US intelligence agents describing Cage as a "jihadist front".

== Reception ==
Cage campaigns against torture, imprisonment without trial, anti-terror laws and similar issues. Human rights groups have said that Cage is doing vital work. Its critics have described the organisation as "apologists for terror".

In 2010, Cage's campaigns to help former detainees re-integrate into society were praised by Cynthia Stroum, the US Ambassador to Luxembourg.

== Amnesty partnership ==
In 2010 Gita Sahgal, leader of Amnesty’s Gender Unit, spoke publicly against Amnesty's partnership with CAGE and Moazzam Begg. She described Begg as "Britain’s most famous supporter of the Taliban" and Cage as "his 'jihadi' group" which, she said, Amnesty was only supporting because it was afraid of being branded racist and Islamophobic. Amnesty's association with Cage, Saghal said, was "undermining its campaign for women's rights".

Amnesty disagreed with Sahgal, saying Begg "advocates effectively detainees' rights to due process, and does so within the same framework of universal human rights standards that we are promoting". Begg described Sahgal's accusations as "ludicrous" saying that he championed women's rights.

== Involvement with specific cases ==
=== Michael Adebolajo ===
Following the murder of Lee Rigby by Michael Adebolajo in May 2013, Cage reported that Adebolajo had suffered harassment from security services before the offence. A report by the Intelligence and Security Committee of the British parliament later confirmed that the British government may have been complicit in his treatment.

=== Mohamed Emwazi ===
In February 2015, Mohamed Emwazi, a 27-year-old Briton, was identified as the probable masked beheader of civilian captives of ISIS in Syria. Emwazi had, between 2009 and January 2012, been in contact with Cage while in the UK, complaining that he was being harassed by British intelligence agencies. At a press conference the following day, Cage's research director, Asim Qureshi, said Emwazi had been "a beautiful young man" and "extremely kind, gentle and soft-spoken". In Qureshi's view, Emwazi's contact with the UK security services had contributed to his transformation into a killer. Prime Minister David Cameron and Mayor of London Boris Johnson both decried the suggestion that Emwazi's radicalisation was the fault of British authorities. The Labour Member of Parliament (MP) John Spellar encouraged charities which funded Cage to rethink in light of their comments. An article published in openDemocracy in July 2015 described media response to Qureshi's comments as 'both overwrought and plainly misleading; not to mention a serious dereliction of the journalistic duty to hold power to account'. Partly as a result of Qureshi's statement, the Charity Commission pressured charities that had previously funded Cage to cease doing so, but changed this position in October 2015. Following Emwazi's death in a drone strike in November 2015 in the Syrian Civil War, Cage was among those who expressed dissatisfaction that he had not been brought to trial.

=== Muhammad Rabbani conviction ===
On 25 September 2017, Muhammad Rabbani, the international director of Cage, was found guilty at Westminster Magistrates Court of having wilfully obstructed police at Heathrow Airport by refusing to divulge the passwords to his mobile phone and laptop computer. Rabbani was given a conditional discharge for 12 months and ordered to pay £620 costs. Rabbani had been stopped whilst returning from Qatar, where Rabbani said he had interviewed a man to collect evidence for UK lawyers of that man's claims of having been tortured while in US custody. On two previous occasions Rabbani had refused to hand over passwords at ports and airports and had been allowed to pass. Gareth Peirce, Rabbani's solicitor, said the verdict would be challenged in the UK High Court. The verdict confirmed that UK police have the powers under Schedule 7 of the Terrorism Act 2000 to demand access to electronic devices. Rabbani claimed that he had been protecting the confidentiality of his client. Rabbani and Cage described the conviction as a "moral victory" against Schedule 7. The ordeal of Rabbani's arrest and trial is documented in the film Phantom Parrot.

== Libel case against The Times ==
In December 2020, Cage and Moazzam Begg received damages of £30,000 plus costs in a libel case they had brought against The Times newspaper. In June 2020, a report in The Times had suggested that Cage and Begg were supporting a man who had been arrested in relation to a knife attack in Reading in which three men were murdered. The Times report also suggested that Cage and Begg were excusing the actions of the accused man by mentioning mistakes made by the police and others. In addition to paying damages, The Times printed an apology which acknowledged that while Cage: “commented on police and media reaction to the attack, they had no involvement with the suspect". Cage stated that the damages amount would be used to "expose state-sponsored Islamophobia and those complicit with it in the press... We will continue to shine a light on war criminals and torture apologists and press barons who fan the flames of hate". It criticised the Murdoch media outlets for "actively support[ing] xenophobic elements and undermin[ing] principles of open society and accountability".

== See also ==
- Andy Worthington
- Reprieve UK
- Scotland Against Criminalising Communities
