= Moazzam Begg =

British Pakistani formerly held in Guantanamo Bay (born 1968)

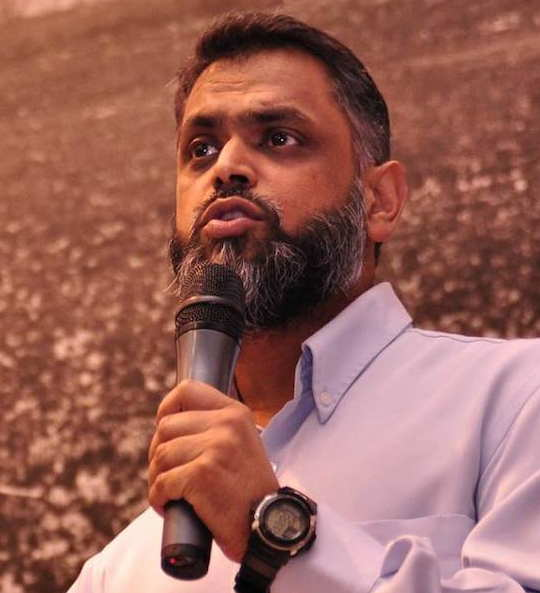
- Moazzam Begg in 2014
- Born: 5 July 1968 (age 58); Sparkhill, Birmingham, UK
- Arrested: February 2002; Islamabad, Pakistan; Pakistani intelligence (Inter-Services Intelligence)
- Released: 26 January 2005; Paddington Green Police Station, London, England, UK
- Citizenship: United Kingdom, Pakistan
- Detained at: Kandahar; Bagram; Guantanamo Bay detention camp
- ISN: 558
- Charge: None
- Status: Released
- Occupation: Outreach director of CAGE
- Spouse: Zaynab Begg
- Parents: Azmat Begg (father)
- Children: 4

Moazzam Begg (Urdu: مُعَظّم بیگ; born 5 July 1968) is a British Pakistani who was held in extrajudicial detention by the US government in the Bagram Theater Internment Facility and the Guantanamo Bay detainment camp, in Cuba, for nearly three years. Seized by Pakistani intelligence at his home in Pakistan in February 2002, he was transferred to the custody of US Army officers, who held him in the detention centre at Bagram, Afghanistan, before transferring him to Guantanamo Bay, where he was held until January 2005.

The US authorities held Begg as an enemy combatant, claiming Begg was an al-Qaeda member, who recruited for, and provided money for, al-Qaeda training camps, and himself trained there to fight US or allied troops. Begg acknowledged having spent time at two non-al Qaeda camps in Afghanistan in the early 1990s, as well as providing some financial support to fighters in Bosnia and Chechnya, but denies that he was ever involved in terrorism.

Begg says that he was abused by guards at Bagram, and saw two detainees beaten to death. Military coroners subsequently ruled that the two deaths were homicides, but US military spokesmen denied Begg's story at the time. Later, a 2005 military investigation into reports of abuse at Bagram concluded that both deaths were caused by abuse by American guards.

Following a "long public outcry" in the UK over the detention of British nationals, in 2004, the UK government intervened on behalf of the British citizens being detained at Guantanamo Bay. President George W. Bush had Begg released without charge on 25 January 2005, despite Pentagon, CIA, and FBI objections. Begg and other British citizens who had been detained at Guantanamo later sued the British government for complicity in their alleged abuse and torture while in US custody. In November 2010, the British Government announced an out-of-court financial settlement with 16 detainees, including Begg.

After his release, Begg became a media commentator on issues pertaining to the US, UK and international anti-terror measures. He toured as a speaker about Guantanamo and other detention facilities. Begg co-authored a book, and has written newspaper and magazine articles. He was interviewed in Taxi to the Dark Side (2007), a documentary about the death in custody of an Afghan detainee and the mistreatment of prisoners held by Americans in Afghanistan and elsewhere.

In 2014, British police arrested Begg, alleging terrorist activities during the Syrian civil war. Charges were later withdrawn and he was released when the prosecution became aware that MI5 had known of, and consented to, his travel to Syria.

== Life before detention ==
=== Early life and education ===
Moazzam Begg was born in Sparkhill in 1968, and grew up in Moseley, both suburbs of Birmingham. His father, Azmat Begg, was born in British India and lived in Pakistan before emigrating with his wife to Great Britain. Begg's mother died when he was six, and his father initially worked in Britain as a bank manager. Begg holds dual UK–Pakistani citizenship.

Begg attended the Jewish King David School, Birmingham, from age 5 to 11, because his father thought it promoted good values. Begg later attended Moseley Secondary School. During secondary school, he became a member of the Lynx gang, a Birmingham street gang. The group was mostly Pakistani, but also included Algerian, Asian, Afro-Caribbean and Irish youths. The group was founded in the early 1970s to fight attacks by far right anti-immigrant groups. He said "we did things that no good Muslim should," but stated he rarely did anything violent. He once appeared in court for taking part in a fight with skinheads.

Begg attended Solihull College, and later the University of Wolverhampton, where he studied Law for two years, which he did not enjoy and did not complete his degree.

=== UK and travels to Islamic countries, 1993–98 ===
On a family holiday to Saudi Arabia and Pakistan in his late teens, Begg became interested in Islam. In late 1993 he returned to Pakistan and crossed the Pakistani–Afghan border with some young Pakistanis near the city of Khost. Begg said he visited a camp where US-backed nationalist and Islamic rebels were training to fight the Soviet-backed Afghan government. The training camp was run by either the anti-Taliban Northern Alliance or a Pakistani group fighting for Kashmir. Begg later wrote of his time at the camp: "I had met men who seemed to me exemplary in their faith and self-sacrifice, and seen a world that awed and inspired me". Begg says he did not participate in the training.

Inspired by the commitment of the mujahedeen, Begg said he travelled to Bosnia in the early 1990s to help the Muslims during the war. He said he was "terribly affected by some of the stories ... of the atrocities taking place there". In 1994 he joined a charity that worked with Muslims in Bosnia. He states he "very briefly" joined the Bosnian Army Foreign Volunteer Force: "In Bosnia, I did fight for a while. But I saw people horribly damaged, and I thought, This is not for me". Begg first met Khalil Deek in Bosnia.

Begg also tried to travel to Chechnya, in the early 1990s during its war with Russia. While he thought that "fighting wasn't out of the question," he says that he did not participate in the armed struggle, but did give financial support to the foreign fighters.

In 1994, Begg was arrested charged with conspiracy to defraud the Department of Social Security. His friend and fellow "Lynx Gang" member Syed Murad Meah Butt was also charged, pleaded guilty, and served 18 months in jail. The fraud charges against Begg were dropped for lack of evidence.

A search of his home by anti-terrorist police, at the time of the 1994 arrest, reportedly found night vision goggles, a flak jacket, and "extremist Islamic literature". Other items found included a hand-held night vision lens. Begg insisted that the goggles and flak jacket were from his charity work in Bosnia and Chechnya and denied owning any "extremist Islamic literature" and noted the items seized were identical to those that many aid workers operating in conflict zones carry. His father said Begg had been collecting military paraphernalia as a hobby since childhood.

In 2005, after Begg's detention at Guantanamo became public knowledge, the US Justice Department alleged he had "received extensive training in al-Qaeda terrorist camps since 1993". Pentagon officials said that Begg trained at three terrorist camps associated with al-Qaeda. While at the training camps, he reportedly trained to use handguns, AK-47 rifles, and RPGs and to plan ambushes. The statement identified Begg as "a member of al-Qaeda and affiliated organisations," who was "engaged in hostilities against the United States and its coalition partners" in Afghanistan and said he "provided support to al-Qaeda terrorists, by providing shelter for their families while the al-Qaeda terrorists committed terrorist acts". Begg has denied all these charges, saying that he has "never planned, aided or participated in any attacks against Westerners".

=== Marriage and move to Pakistan ===
In 1995, Begg married, and in early 1998, he and his new family moved to Peshawar, Pakistan. An American counterterrorism official claimed that the CIA and MI5 suspected Begg had worked with Khalil Deek, who also lived in Peshawar at that time, to create a CD-ROM terrorist manual. Begg said in interviews that he had met Deek in Bosnia and later collaborated with him on a business enterprise to sell traditional Pakistani clothing, but said he had never met Zubaydah. Pentagon officials said this conflicts with what he told interrogators.

Begg notes that he visited a second Afghan training camp, near Jalalabad, for two or three days during that time. He says it was run by Iraqi Kurds, not by al-Qaeda. They were training to use improvised incendiary grenades to fight Saddam Hussein. He donated a few hundred British pounds to that camp and a third training camp. A Pentagon spokesman said Begg spent five days in early 1998 at Derunta, an al-Qaeda-affiliated Afghan training camp. Defense Department officials said that Begg's sworn statements state he trained at Derunta and two other Afghan camps. He denied saying that, but acknowledged signing some documents while in custody because he feared for his life.

=== UK, 1998–2001 ===
Begg returned to Birmingham in 1998 and, along with Imran Khan, a former stockbroker, opened the 'Maktabah Al Ansar' Islamic book and video shop, in Sparkhill, Birmingham. Police raided the shop the following year. In 1999, Begg's bookstore commissioned and published a book by Dhiren Barot about Barot's experiences in Kashmir, entitled The Army of Madinah in Kashmir.

In February 2000, police and MI5 officers investigating Islamic terrorism raided the bookshop, took away books, files and computers, questioned staff and arrested Begg under British anti-terrorism laws. Begg was released without charge. Begg's father said the British government retrieved encrypted files from his son's computer, and ordered Begg to open them, but Begg refused. A judge ruled that Begg could not be compelled to unlock the files.

Ruhal Ahmed was one of the so-called 'Tipton Three,' young men from Tipton in Britain who were held as Guantanamo detainees. While incarcerated in Guantanamo, he is alleged to have told investigators that he had first become interested in jihad in summer 2000 after purchasing books on the subject from the Maktabah Al Ansar bookshop.

Begg's home in the UK was raided by anti-terrorist police in the summer of 2001. They took his computer and some related materials, but he was not charged.

=== Afghanistan and Pakistan, July 2001 – February 2002 ===
With his wife Zaynab and three young children, Begg moved to Kabul, Afghanistan, in late July 2001. At the time, the Taliban ruled most of Afghanistan. Begg considered it an economical place to bring up his family, and one where they would not be harassed for their race. He wrote in his autobiography that by 2001 the Taliban had made "some modest progress — in social justice and upholding pure, old Islamic values forgotten in many Islamic countries". Begg has since criticised the Taliban for its human rights abuses.

He says that he moved to Kabul to build wells in northwest Afghanistan, where there had been a drought in 2000. He and others also intended to build a school for girls in Kabul. Begg says while still in the UK, he, and others, had raised money and had begun providing equipment for a school. He says he was in the process of starting the school, and intended to work in it as an aid worker. The Taliban regime opposed education for females and had not given him a licence for the school, but "they didn't try to stop us either", The Taliban, he says, "were more receptive to Islamic volunteers", and that the repression of women was less intense in Kabul than in other places he saw. While in Afghanistan, he bought a handgun.

In his book Enemy Combatant, Begg recalls telling two US agents who visited him in Guantanamo Bay that:

I wanted to live in an Islamic state–one that was free from the corruption and despotism of the rest of the Muslim world.... I knew you wouldn't understand. The Taliban were better than anything Afghanistan has had in the past 25 years.

Begg has also said "before the Taliban, warlords abounded, there was no security, the opium trade was booming, children were being used as sex slaves. At least the Taliban provided security and were building roads, and as opposed to the warlords, they seemed honest".

Begg says that he "had never even heard of al-Qaeda before 9/11", and although he knew about Osama bin Laden, he agreed with those who saw bin Laden's conflict with the US as "counterproductive for Muslims".

The Allied attack on Afghanistan began in October 2001, and, following the fall of the Taliban, a US Justice Department dossier on Begg alleges that he joined their retreat to the Tora Bora mountains. The Pentagon claims that he was "prepared to fight in the front line against allied forces". He says that he and his family intended to evacuate to Islamabad in Pakistan for safety. Initially he became separated from his family in Afghanistan, he and several other men were guided over the mountains into western Pakistan, and he was reunited with his family in Pakistan by mid-November.

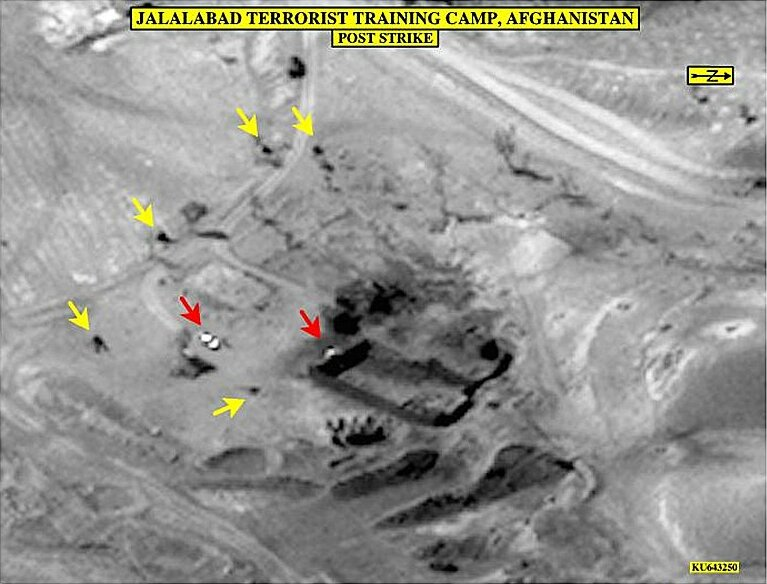
Surveillance photo of the Derunta training camp after US bombardment.

Derunta training camp, 15 miles (24 km) from Jalalabad, was captured in November 2001. In the camp was found, among other things, a photocopy of a wire transfer moving funds from the Habib Bank AG Zurich to a 'Moazzam Begg' in Karachi. US and Pakistani officials did not know who this was. Begg maintains that he is unaware of such a transaction, and that no one has ever shown him the document.

In February 2002, Begg was seized at his rented home in Islamabad by, what Begg believes were, Pakistani agents working on behalf of the US. His family maintained it was a case of mistaken identity. Begg says the Pakistanis treated him well and that after several weeks, they transferred him to United States Army officers in Bagram, near Kabul.

== Detention by US, 2002–2005 ==
=== Detention in Afghanistan ===
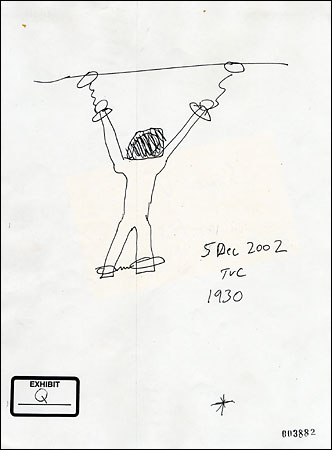
Sketch of Dilawar chained to ceiling of his cell, by former Reserve US Army Military Police Corps sergeant

Begg was held at Bagram Theater Internment Facility from February 2002 to February 2003. He says that while there he was hog-tied, kicked, punched, left in a room with a bag put over his head (even though he suffered from asthma), sworn at, denied access to a lawyer, and threatened with electric shocks, having his fingers broken, sexual abuse, and, with extraordinary rendition to Egypt or Syria if he did not sign confessions.

Pentagon spokesman Bryan Whitman later said there was "no credible evidence that Begg was ever abused by US forces", and US intelligence officials insisted Begg had exaggerated the harshness of his treatment, though Whitman declined to answer whether Begg's abuse allegations had ever been investigated.

In July 2004, Begg wrote in a letter of "threats of torture, actual torture, death threats, racial and religious abuse", "cruel and unusual treatment", and that "documents ... were signed under duress". He also wrote: "This culminated, in my opinion, with the deaths of two fellow detainees, at the hands of US military personnel, to which I myself was partially witness". Begg claims that while at Bagram, he saw two other detainees (Dilawar and Habibullah) being beaten so badly that he believed the beatings caused their deaths.

At the time DoD denied Begg's account and, despite military coroner's having ruled the deaths as homicides, military spokesmen at that time attributed the deaths to natural causes. However a Department of Defense investigation, whose results were reported in May 2005, concluded that the deaths of Dilawar and Habibullah were wholly due to mistreatment by American soldiers. Begg wrote after his release that, he believed, one of the reasons he had continued to be detained was because he had been a witness to the two killings.

Guantanamo files leaked in 2011 revealed that, nine months after Begg's capture, the Department of Defence had concluded that Begg was a "confirmed member of al-Qaida," and that he had been an instructor at the Derunta training camp, as well as having attended the al-Badr and Harakat aI-Ansar training camps.

=== Detention in Guantanamo Bay ===
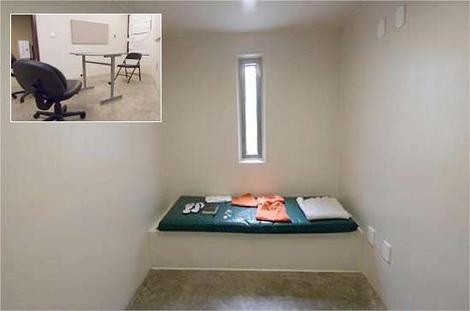
Cell in which a Guantanamo Bay prisoner was detained. Inset is the prisoners' reading room

On 2 February 2003, Begg was transferred to United States military custody at Guantanamo Bay detention camp. A February 2003 editorial in Gulf News reported that Begg had written to his parents that he did not know what he was accused of and was beginning to feel hopeless and depressed. It also said that Begg had confessed to being part of a plot to spray the Palace of Westminster with anthrax, a plan which had "caused hilarity" among security experts because of its implausibility, but, the article claimed, detainees were not allowed access to a lawyer until they had confessed to a crime.

Begg was held in Guantanamo Bay for just under two years, the first almost 600 days of which were spent in solitary confinement. The US government considered Begg an enemy combatant, and claimed that he trained at al-Qaeda terrorist camps in Afghanistan. He was not charged with any crime and was not allowed to consult legal counsel for the majority of the time he spent there.

On 9 October 2003, a memo summarising a meeting between General Geoffrey Miller and his staff and Vincent Cassard of the International Committee of the Red Cross said that camp authorities did not permit them to have access to Begg, due to "military necessity". This is allowed by the Geneva Conventions, only as an "exceptional and temporary measure".

In July 2004, Begg wrote a letter saying he was not tortured in Guantanamo, though the conditions were "torturous". Late in 2004, Clive Stafford Smith (a British lawyer working in the US) visited Begg and said he heard "credible and consistent evidence" from Begg of torture, including the use of strappado.

Begg's American lawyer, Gitanjali Gutierrez of the Center for Constitutional Rights, received a handwritten letter from him, dated 12 July 2004, addressed to the US Forces Administration at Guantanamo Bay. It was copied to Begg's lawyers, and the US authorities agreed to declassify it. Its full text was passed to his British lawyer, Gareth Peirce. He insisted: "I am a law-abiding citizen of the UK, and attest vehemently to my innocence, before God and the law, of any crime — though none has even been alleged".

=== Alleged contacts with extremists ===
Name	Notes
Shahid Akram Butt	Leader of the 'Lynx Gang', in Birmingham, England; arrested in Britain accused of benefit fraud with Begg. Butt was convicted though Begg was released without charge. Butt was later convicted along with 7 others in Yemen of plotting a terrorist bombing
Omar Saeed Sheikh	Volunteered on 1993 Convoy of Mercy trip to Bosnia; later convicted of kidnapping Western tourists in India, was convicted in Pakistan accused of taking part in the murder of Daniel Pearl but successfully appealed the guilty verdict. The US Department of Defense (DoD) alleges links with Begg, but he says they have never met
Khalil al-Deek	Lived in Peshawar, Pakistan, while Begg lived there; alleged contact of Adam Gadahn. DoD alleges Begg and Deek worked together to create a CD-ROM terrorist manual. Begg says they first met in Bosnia and later both invested in a business venture selling traditional Pakistani clothing but that Begg never met any of al-Deek's al-Qaeda contacts. Begg says that he last met Deek in 1996 in Britain.
Abu Hamza al-Masri	US officials claimed that US and British counterterrorism officials had believed since 1999 that Begg had a connection to al-Masri at Finsbury Park Mosque.
Abu Zubaydah	Begg says they never met, but DoD says he admitted to meeting Zubaydah during interrogation.
Dhiren Barot	Convicted terrorist, found guilty in the UK of conspiracy to murder at various US targets; Wrote a book that Begg's bookshop commissioned and published in 1999
Richard C. Reid	Convicted of trying to blow up an aircraft with a shoe bomb DoD alleges links, but Begg says they have never met
Ibn al-Shaykh al-Libi	Alleged trainer for al-Qaeda DoD alleges links, but Begg says they have never met
Abu Qatada	Alleged Al-Qaeda associate DoD alleges links, but Begg says they have never met
Shaker Aamer	Guantanamo Bay analysts allege that Begg met Aamer in Pakistan in 1998 and visited James McLintock (the so-called 'Tartan Taliban'). They allege that Begg told interrogators he went to Ireland with Aamer in 2000 to visit Ibrahim Boyasseer, listed by the United Nations as an "Individual Associated with Al-Qaeda"
Mahmoud Abu Rideh	Palestinian, alleged associate of al-Qaeda leaders, arrested in the UK shortly after the September 2001 attacks, released without charge in 2005 when the UK House of Lords ruled his detention illegal. Upon release, placed under a control order until 2009, when Rideh was allowed to leave the UK Previously started a school for Arabic-speaking girls in Afghanistan, which Begg helped to build. Reportedly killed by an airstrike in 2010 in Pakistan.

== Release ==
Following the United States Supreme Court decision in Rasul v. Bush (2004), in which the court ruled that detainees had habeas corpus rights and could challenge their detention, the US government quickly developed a system of Combatant Status Review Tribunals, Administrative Review Boards, and military commissions to provide the detainees with an "impartial tribunal" for reviewing their cases. Detainees could not call defence lawyers, could not review the evidence against them, and had allegations made that were dependent on hearsay evidence. The British government protested about their citizens being subjected to the planned Guantanamo tribunals, because due process rights would be severely curtailed.

On 11 January 2005, the British Foreign Secretary Jack Straw announced that, after "intensive and complex discussions" between his government and the US, the remaining four British nationals in Guantanamo Bay would be returned "within weeks". While they were still regarded as "enemy combatants" by the US government, it had brought no specific charges against them. The New York Times and CNN reported that Bush had released Begg as a favour to British Prime Minister Tony Blair, who was being harshly criticised in the UK for his support of the Iraq war. The Atlantic claimed that the Bush administration has tried to make a gag order a condition of Begg's release, but that this would not have been acceptable to the British public.

On 25 January 2005, Begg and the three other British detainees, Feroz Abbasi, Martin Mubanga and Richard Belmar, were flown to RAF Northolt in west London. On arrival they were arrested under the Terrorism Act 2000 by officers from the Metropolitan Police and taken to Paddington Green Police Station for questioning by anti-terrorist officers. By 9.00pm on 26 January, all four had been released without charge.

== Post-release: January 2005–present ==
=== US claims of ties to terrorism ===
Bush released Begg over the objections of the Pentagon, the CIA, and the FBI, overruling most of his senior national security advisers, who were concerned that Begg could be a dangerous terrorist. In 2006, the Pentagon still maintained that he was a terrorist.

After Begg's release, Bryan Whitman, a Defense Department spokesman, said of Begg: "He has strong, long-term ties to terrorism — as a sympathizer, as a recruiter, as a financier and as a combatant". Whitman quoted from a single-spaced eight-page confession that Begg had signed while incarcerated in Bagram: "I was armed and prepared to fight alongside the Taliban and al-Qaeda against the U.S. and others, and eventually retreated to Tora Bora to flee from U.S. forces when our front lines collapsed".

Begg maintains the confession is false, and that he gave it while under duress. Whitman said Begg was trying to recant his confession and that Begg was now "clearly lying", though Whitman declined to answer whether Begg's abuse allegations had ever been investigated.

Former military interrogator Christopher Hogan said: "He provided us with excellent information routinely ... I don't think he was the mastermind of 9/11, but nor do I think he was just an innocent ... more of a romantic than some sort of ideologically steeled fighter". The New York Times reported in June 2006, "of nearly 20 American military and intelligence officials who were interviewed about Begg, none thought he had been wrongly detained. But some said they doubted that he could be tied to any terrorist acts".

=== Alleged contacts with extremists after release ===
Begg gave a number of presentations to the Islamic Society at University College London in 2007, at a time that Umar Farouk Abdulmutallab was its president. The Times reported that Begg took part in the 'War on Terror Week' UCL presentations at Abdulmutallab's invitation. The New York Times reported that Abdulmutallab had helped to organise the week as president of the society and that an attendee had claimed that Abdulmutallab was seated "very close [to Begg]". The Weekly Standard called Begg "A jihadist", "a masterful anti-American propagandist" and "a demonstrable fraud".

Begg said that he does not recall Abdulmutallab, and that he was told that the 'War on Terror Week' UCL presentations were organised by Qasim Rafiq, a friend of Abdulmuttalab's. He was told Abdulmutallab did not attend any of the lectures.

Begg interviewed American imam, and alleged al-Qaeda senior figure, Anwar al-Awlaki after al-Awlaki was released from jail in Yemen in 2007. Al-Awlaki was invited to address CAGE's' Ramadan fundraising dinners in August 2008 at Wandsworth Civic Centre, South London (by videolink, as he was banned from entering the UK), and August 2009 at Kensington Town Hall.

=== Passport refusal and confiscation ===
In February 2005, British Home Secretary Charles Clarke refused to issue Begg a passport. He did so based on information obtained while Begg was in US custody. He said "there are strong grounds for believing that, on leaving the UK, [Begg] would take part in activities against the United Kingdom or allied targets". Clarke used Royal prerogative to refuse the passport which had only been used 13 times since 1947 in this way – the previous time being in 1976.

A British passport was issued in 2009, but in 2013 it was confiscated at Heathrow airport upon Begg's return from a trip to South Africa. The Home Office said that Begg had been assessed as having been involved in terrorist activity due to a trip to Syria the previous year. Begg claimed that the real reason for the confiscation was his campaign to prove UK and US complicity in the use of torture and rendition of suspects, and that he had been stopped for questioning almost every time he had travelled, even when returning from an official speaking invitation at the European Parliament.

In January 2022, Begg announced he was taking legal action for a judicial review of the British Home Secretary's rejection of his application for a passport, which had been confiscated in 2013. In February 2022 VICE World News published an interview of Mr Begg in which refers to his continuing harassment by authorities.

=== Public positions ===
Since his release, Begg has stated he is against attacks such as 9/11 but that he supported those fighting against British soldiers in Iraq and Afghanistan. In 2010, referring to Afghanistan, Begg said he completely supported the inalienable right of the people to fight foreign occupation. if resisting the occupation of Afghanistan was not only considered good but lionised [in the 1980s] by the British government and US . . . then nothing has changed other than interests."

He has worked as outreach director for the charitable organisation and advocacy group CAGE, (formerly 'Cageprisoners') to represent those detainees still held at Guantanamo, as well as to help those who have been released to get services and integrate into society. He has travelled on speaking tours, and worked to persuade governments to accept former detainees for resettlement. In 2010, Cynthia Stroum, then-U.S. Ambassador to Luxembourg, commented "Mr Begg is doing our work for us...", adding that Begg's "articulate, reasoned presentation makes for a convincing argument".

In December 2005, Begg made a video appeal to the Swords of Righteousness Brigade, the Iraqi kidnappers of four Western peace workers, asking for their release. There was an inter-faith effort calling for the men's release. Abu Qatada, a detainee held in Britain also appealed for release of the men. In early March 2006, the body of the American hostage, Tom Fox, was found in Baghdad. A week-long military operation led by British forces secured the release of the remaining three hostages, one Briton and two Canadians, later that month.

In 2010, when CAGE had recently expanded its work to include the highlighting of the use of drone strikes for extrajudicial killings, Begg said that little had changed despite Barack Obama's promises: "We say that Bush was the president of torture, but Obama is the president of extra-judicial killing . . . while one used to extra-judicially detain people, the other has gone a step further and extra-judicially kills them". Speaking of Guantánamo, Begg said that recently released detainees had told him that conditions had improved slightly after Obama came to power, but none believed it would close: "It is like a town now and every thing around it has continued to expand. It seems that this is a permanent facility and they intend to keep it as such".

Following the 2014 Peshawar school massacre, in which over 130 pupils and teachers were killed by the Tehrik-i-Taliban Pakistan, Begg wrote a comment on Facebook which was reported in his home town's main newspaper, the Birmingham Post. Begg stated that 'It is time to stop this cycle of uncontrolled rage and internecine violence that will only drive us to the pits of hell. Incessant calls for revenge each time need to be tempered with reflections on the consequences of what that means. There are no winners in this'.

==== Speaker and activist ====
As director of outreach for the prisoner rights organisation, CAGE, Begg has appeared in the media and around the country, lecturing on issues pertaining to the British Muslim community, such as imprisonment without trial, torture, anti-terror legislation and measures and community relations. He has appeared as a commentator on radio and television interviews and documentaries, including the BBC's Panorama and Newsnight shows, PBS's The Prisoner, Al-Jazeera's Prisoner 345, Taking Liberties, and Torturing Democracy, and National Geographic's Guantanamo's Secrets. He has authored pieces which have appeared in newspapers and magazines.

He has toured as a speaker about his time in detention facilities, calling the British response to terrorism racist, and disproportionate to anti-terror measures and legislation during the Troubles in Northern Ireland. In January 2009, Begg toured the UK with former Guantanamo guard Christopher Arendt, in the Two Sides, One Story tour.

Begg has campaigned against US wartime policy with human rights organisations such as Reprieve, Amnesty International, the Center for Constitutional Rights, PeaceMaker and Conflicts Forum.

In July 2015, Begg endorsed Jeremy Corbyn's campaign in the Labour Party leadership election.

=== Book, 2006 ===
Begg co-authored a book released in March 2006 about his Guantanamo experiences, it was co-written with Victoria Brittain, a former associate foreign editor of The Guardian. It was published in Britain as Enemy Combatant: A British Muslim's Journey To Guantanamo and Back (ISBN 0-7432-8567-0), and in the US as Enemy Combatant: My Imprisonment at Guantanamo, Bagram, and Kandahar (ISBN 1-59558-136-7). In the US, the foreword was written by David Ignatius of The Washington Post.

The book received praise in Britain for Begg's "outstanding liberality of mind and evenhandedness toward his captors".

It received mixed reviews in the US, Publishers Weekly described it as "a fast-paced, harrowing narrative". "Much of the Moazzam Begg story is consistent with other accounts of detention conditions in both Afghanistan and Guantanamo", said John Sifton, a New York-based official from Human Rights Watch, who interviewed former Guantanamo prisoners in Pakistan and Afghanistan.

The New York Times reported "some notable gaps in Mr. Begg's memoir", such as not mentioning his arrest in 1994 for alleged fraud. U-T San Diego said: "Begg has been less than forthcoming about his criminal past ... his cooperation with interrogators ... and his ties to terrorism".

Jonathan Raban, reviewing the book for The New York Review of Books, wrote " The gaps in his story — and they're more frustrating than downright suspicious — cease at the moment when Begg enters captivity". Raban criticised some "notably talentless" dialogue writing, "Perhaps Begg really did strike up a warm relationship with soldier Jennifer … but only in bad fiction do people speak this way". Finally concluding "There can be no doubt about the reality of the predicament described by Moazzam Begg … the indiscriminate dragnet thrown out by the United States … brought in a catch that included many bystanders who happened to be in the wrong place at the wrong time, and whose single common denominator was that they were Muslims."

The Muslim News called it an "open, honest and touching account". Begg earned the "Published Writer Award" for the book, at the annual Muslim Writers Awards in March 2008.

=== Lawsuit against the British government ===
In April 2008, Begg and seven other former Guantanamo detainees filed lawsuits in Britain's High Court accusing the British Attorney General, Home and Foreign Secretaries, MI5 and MI6, of unlawful acts, negligence and complicity in their abduction, treatment and interrogation. At a 2009 court hearing, Government lawyers denied the charges, but stated that MI5 had interviewed some detainees and in some instances supplied questions that they wished prisoners to be asked.

In November 2010, the British Government announced that it had reached a financial settlement with 16 detainees, including Begg. The British Government said there was no evidence that British officials participated directly in the abuse of prisoners, however, in 2010, a Public inquiry was formed to investigate the matter. In 2013, an interim report by the Gibson Inquiry into British involvement in torture and rendition of detainees concluded that the British government and UK intelligence services had been involved in rendition and had interviewed suspects whom they knew were being mistreated. The public inquiry was then suspended and further investigation handed over to the Parliamentary Intelligence and Security Committee.

=== Guantanamo video game, 2009 ===
In 2009, Begg was an advisor, and was due to appear as himself, for the Scottish software company T-Enterprise in the development of a video game entitled Rendition: Guantanamo, for Microsoft's Xbox 360. The game would have put the player in the place of the detainees.

The software company's director said, "We approached Moazzam because it's very hard for us to know how to design the layout of the prison and he helped", and that neither US nor British soldiers would get killed in the game, only mercenaries. Begg said that, when first approached, he hesitated, "I was worried that it might trivialise my experience", but that he would "help to bring those issues to people who would not usually think about it". Although Begg had a financial stake in the game, he said that he had not received any money at that point. The software company said: "We have had a lot of hate mail about this, mainly from America, saying things like 'don't dare put out a game that shows them killing our soldiers'".

Conservative pundits such as The Weekly Standard's Tom Joscelyn and radio host Rush Limbaugh reacted negatively to the game and Begg's involvement. Ultimately, T-Enterprise did not complete the game due to US press coverage, which it described as "inaccurate and ill informed speculation ... many conclusions were reached that have absolutely no foundation whatsoever".

=== Amnesty International controversy, 2010 ===
In 2010, Gita Sahgal, then head of Amnesty's gender unit, publicly condemned her organisation for its collaboration with Begg because of his association with CAGE. She said its "Counter Terror With Justice" campaign "constitutes a threat to human rights". In an open letter to Amnesty's leadership, she said: "To be appearing on platforms with Britain's most famous supporter of the Taliban, whom we treat as a human rights defender, is a gross error of judgment".

Begg filed a complaint with the Press Complaints Commission against The Sunday Times for publishing an accusation of links between Amnesty and the Taliban. Amnesty International posted a response to press coverage of the incident by Claudio Cordone, Amnesty Secretary General, pointing out that Amnesty's work with Begg had "focused exclusively on highlighting the human rights violations committed in Guantánamo Bay".

Begg says he later discussed the allegations with Sahgal, "Because I advocate a negotiated settlement in Afghanistan, she portrayed me as the greatest supporter of the Taliban and therefore, by extension, a supporter of everything they have said in terms of rights of women and so forth. That's not very clever, nor is it very honest".

=== UK terrorism charges, 2014 ===
In February 2014, Begg was arrested by West Midlands Police on suspicion of attending a terrorist training camp and facilitating terrorism overseas. West Midlands Police said: "This is an arrest, not a charge, and ... our naming does not imply any guilt". In July of the same year, Begg was charged by the same force with terrorist activities related to his alleged actions in the Syrian Civil War, including attending a terrorist training camp. While awaiting trial, he was held in Belmarsh, a British high-security prison.

In October 2014, shortly before his trial was due to start, Begg was released after the prosecution announced that they would be offering no evidence due to documents having come into their possession showing that MI5 had been aware of, and had consented to, Begg's travels to Syria. West Midlands Police said "new evidence had come to light" and immediately following the verdict, its assistant chief constable said the police fully accepted that Moazzam Begg was an innocent man. A CPS spokesperson said 'If we had been made aware of all of this information at the time of charging, we would not have charged'.

=== Libel case against The Times ===
In December 2020, Cage and Moazzam Begg received damages of £30,000 plus costs in a libel case they had brought against The Times newspaper. In June 2020, a report in The Times had suggested that Cage and Begg were supporting a man who had been arrested in relation to a knife attack in Reading in which three men were murdered. The Times report also suggested that Cage and Begg were excusing the actions of the accused man by mentioning mistakes made by the police and others. In addition to paying damages, The Times printed an apology. Cage stated that the damages amount would be used to "expose state-sponsored Islamophobia and those complicit with it in the press... The Murdoch press empire has actively supported xenophobic elements and undermined principles of open society and accountability... We will continue to shine a light on war criminals and torture apologists and press barons who fan the flames of hate".

=== Palestine Action protest arrest, 2025 ===
On 9 August 2025, Begg attended a protest in Parliament Square, London, opposing the UK government’s decision to proscribe the activist group Palestine Action under the Terrorism Act 2000. The Metropolitan Police estimated between 500 and 600 people were present when the protest began, and at 1 p.m., many unveiled placards reading “I oppose genocide. I support Palestine Action.” Police arrested 466 people at the scene for suspected offences under the Act, later rising to more than 500 – the largest number detained in a single day by the force in over a decade. Begg was among those arrested, according to contemporaneous media reports.

== Open letter to President Biden ==
On 29 January 2021 the New York Review of Books published an open letter from Begg, and six other Guantanamo detainees, to newly inaugurated American President Biden, appealing to him to close the detention camp.

== Documentary appearances ==
- Begg was among those interviewed in the 2007 documentary Taxi to the Dark Side about the killing of an Afghan taxi driver at Bagram detention centre. The film, which was directed by American filmmaker Alex Gibney, won the 2007 Academy Award for "Best Documentary Feature". The documentary was also shown as part of the international Why Democracy? documentary series.
- Begg is the subject of an extended interview in The Confession (2016), discussing his life prior to his incarceration in Guantánamo Bay, his incarceration, and subsequent life. It was given four stars by the Guardian, who described Begg's "principled, consistent testimony" having a "rare gravity and profound moral force". This documentary has also been shown in the BBC Storyville documentary series, under the title Moazzam Begg: Living the War on Terror.
- Begg is interviewed in the 2009 documentary Outside the Law: Stories from Guantanamo, co-directed by Andy Worthington and Polly Nash. The film focuses on the cases of Begg and other UK detainees with comments by lawyers Clive Stafford Smith, Gareth Peirce and Tom Wilner.
- In 2006, Begg was interviewed in the video 21st Century CrUSAders, saying that the war on terror is really akin to a war on Islam. According to Gareth Peirce, possession of this film has been offered in British courts as evidence of radicalisation.

=== Representation in play ===
- Begg, and his father Azmat, both feature as characters in a play written by Victoria Brittain and Gillian Slovo, entitled Guantanamo: Honor Bound to Defend Freedom, which opened in 2004 at the Tricycle Theatre before transferring to the New Ambassadors Theatre in London's West End. The play is based on the testimonies of detainees and others. A production was mounted at the Culture Project in New York. In 2006 the Tricycle presented performances of the play at the Houses of Parliament and on Washington's Capitol Hill.

== See also ==
- Babar Ahmad
