= Khalil al-Deek =

Khalil Said al-Deek (born 1957) a.k.a. Joseph Adams after 1996, was a dual US-Jordanian citizen who came to USA to study computer science. He became a naturalized US citizen living in Los Angeles, California where he worked as computer engineer and Charity Without Borders staffer, where it is now believed that Adam Yahiye Gadahn worked around that same time in 1997. The Charity was discovered to be an al-Qaeda organization used to funnel money overseas and wasn't shut down until after September 11, 2001. Hisham Diab was running this organization at the time and it was confirmed by his ex-wife Saraah Olson that Hisham and Khalil Said al-Deek recruited Adam Yahiye Gadahn and transformed him into an American-hating fanatic. This was also confirmed by the imam Haitham Bundakji of the Islamic Society of Orange County who described Hisham and members of his cell as "disruptive troublemakers" and places blame on himself for not reaching out to Gadahn.

Carrying a US passport, he moved to Peshawar, Pakistan, where he is believed to have met several times with Osama bin Laden. He was arrested on December 17, 1999, in Peshawar and extradited to Jordan for conspiracy to carry out terrorist attacks in Jordan. CNN reported that al-Deek was the leader of his group.

One report claimed al-Deek and 27 others were indicted, in Jordan on March 29, 2000. The International Counter-Terrorism blog reported that Al-Deek was indicted in absentia and had already been extradited. The San Diego Union Tribune reported that Jordan held Al-Deek for 17 months before releasing him without charge.

Judith Miller of The New York Times reported that al-Deek had business ties to Abu Zubaydah. Miller reported that al-Deek and Abu Zubaydah exported specialty honey, a traditionally high-valued product, and sent a portion of the profits to bin Laden and al-Qaeda. Miller reported that the shipment of honey was used to mask the shipment of weapons.

Tim Golden of The New York Times reported that an unnamed American intelligence official suspected al-Deek collaborated with Moazzam Begg on a CD-ROM version of an "Encyclopedia of Jihad". The official claimed al-Deek gave a copy of this CD-ROM to two suspected Jordanian terrorists. According to al-Qaeda, al-Deek was later killed in the Shah-i-Kot Valley in Afghanistan by a "Pakistani agent."

His wife informed his brother that he had died in April 2005. At around the same time, rumours from unnamed intelligence sources began to spread suggesting he was killed somewhere in Pakistan. The OC Weekly suggested it was also possible he had faked his own death.
