= Victoria Brittain =

British journalist and author (born 1942)

- Born: Victoria Catherine Brittain; 1942 (age 83–84); India
- Occupations: Journalist, author, human rights campaigner
- Organizations: The Guardian; Declassified UK
- Spouse(s): Andrew Knight (m. 1966) (divorced); Peter Sharrock

Victoria Brittain (born 1942) is a British journalist and author who lived and worked for many years in Africa, the US, and Asia, including 20 years at The Guardian, where she eventually became associate foreign editor. In the 1980s, she worked closely with the anti-apartheid movement, interviewing activists from the United Democratic Front and the Southern African liberation movements. A notable campaigner for human rights throughout the developing world, Brittain has contributed widely to many international publications, writing particularly on Africa, the US and the Middle East, and has also authored books and plays, including 2013's Shadow Lives: The Forgotten Women of the War on Terror.

== Background ==
Brittain was born in India and was three or four years old when she went to Britain – as she said in a 2018 interview: "My father was part of the so-called British Empire and he was like a leftover from that period."

Brittain has lived and worked in Saigon, Algiers, Nairobi, London and Washington, DC, and has reported from more than two dozen African countries, as well as the Middle East (particularly Palestine and Lebanon) and Cuba. She worked for The Guardian for more than two decades and has written for many other outlets and publications, including Afrique/Asie, Le Monde Diplomatique, The Nation, and Race and Class. In 1993, MI5 began a three-year surveillance operation (including phone-tapping and bugging her house) against Brittain as a total of £250,000 of money had arrived in her bank account, possibly laundered from Libyan sources. It was later discovered that this money was from the Ghanaian military officer Kojo Tsikata. Brittain had agreed to channel Tsikata's funds for a libel case against The Independent through her personal account; unbeknownst to her, Tsikata was receiving funds for his suit from Libya.

Her work has focused on human rights and she has written widely and given lectures related to Guantanamo Bay prison. Her activist writings and work encompass plays – Guantanamo (Tricycle Theatre, 2004), with Gillian Slovo, and The Meaning of Waiting (Purcell Room, Southbank Centre, 2010) – and broadcasts on various media outlets. She was a consultant to the United Nations on the impact of conflict on women, also the subject of a research paper for the London School of Economics.

Books that she has written or edited include Moazzam Begg's co-authored work Enemy Combatant: My Imprisonment at Guantanamo, Bagram, and Kandahar (2006). Brittain is a trustee of Prisoners of Conscience and of the Ariel and Melbourne Trust. She was a founder member of the annual Palestine Festival of Literature in 2008, and is a trustee of the Palestine Book Awards.

As of 2020, Brittain was chair of Declassified UK, an investigative journalism organisation with a focus on UK foreign, military and intelligence policies.

== Personal life ==
In 1966, Brittain married Andrew Knight, by whom she had a son. After their divorce, she married another journalist, Peter Sharrock, by whom she had a daughter, Thea Sharrock.

== Selected bibliography ==
- Hidden Lives, Hidden Deaths: South Africa's Crippling of a Continent, Faber & Faber, 1988.
- Gulf Between Us: Gulf War and Beyond (editor), Virago Press, 1991. ISBN 978-1853813863.
- Death of Dignity: Angola's Civil War, Pluto Press, 1997. ISBN 978-0745312477.
- Guantanamo: 'Honor Bound to Defend Freedom' (with Gillian Slovo), Oberon Books, 2005.
- The Meaning of Waiting: Tales from the War on Terror Prisoners' Wives Verbatim, Oberon Books, 2010. ISBN 978-1849430517.
- Shadow Lives: The Forgotten Women of the War on Terror, Pluto Press, 2013. ISBN 978-0745333267.
- Love and Resistance in the Films of Mai Masri (Palgrave Studies in Arab Cinema), Palgrave Pivot, 2020. ISBN 978-3-030-37521-8 (hardcover); ISBN 978-3-030-37524-9 (softcover).
