= Dhiren Barot =

Indian-born British terrorist

- Born: 1 December 1971 (age 54); Baroda, India
- Other names: Bilal, Abu Musa al-Hindi, Abu Eissa al-Hindi, and Issa al-Britani
- Occupations: Terrorist (Kashmir Mujahideen al-Qaeda)

Dhiren Barot (aliases: Bilal, Abu Musa al-Hindi, Abu Eissa al-Hindi, and Issa al-Britani; born 1 December 1971) is a British convicted terrorist.

== Background ==
Barot was born in Baroda, India, into a Hindu family but converted to Islam later on in life. His parents moved to the UK in 1973 when he was aged one. He attended the Kingsbury High School in north London. He worked from 1991 to 1995 as an airline ticket and reservations agent for Air Malta, in Piccadilly, central London. He converted to Islam at the age of 20 in the UK.

Barot travelled to Pakistan in 1995. He took part in militant campaigns against Indian forces in Kashmir. Using the pseudonym Esa Al Hindi, he wrote a book, The Army of Madinah in Kashmir, in 1999, discussing his experiences and describing ways to kill Indian soldiers. The book was commissioned and published by Maktabah al-Ansar bookshop. According to The Times of India, in the late 1990s and early 2000, he served as an agent for al-Qaeda.

Barot is credited with authoring a 39-page memo that advocated the use of simple explosives composed of materials available from local pharmacies and hardware stores. The memo was created for distribution among al-Qaeda operatives and was discovered in 2004 on a laptop in Pakistan. He reportedly learned the tactics from observations at al-Qaeda training camps.

He arrived in the US in August 2000 on a student visa along with Nadeem Tarmohamed; however, he never attended any college in the USA. Around this time he began to do extensive reconnaissance of American targets for al-Qaeda. In a Pakistan arrest of al-Qaeda operatives agents found some 51 compact discs, dating from 2001, of reports and targeting research allegedly compiled by Barot. On 8 April 2001, Barot returned to the UK.

== Arrest ==
Barot was arrested on 3 August 2004. He was charged by the UK authorities with the following offences:

- Conspiracy to commit murder.
- Conspiracy to commit a public nuisance by the use of radioactive materials, toxic gases, chemicals and or explosives.
- Possessing detailed reconnaissance on the Prudential Building in New Jersey.
- Possessing detailed reconnaissance of the International Monetary Fund headquarters in Washington, the New York Stock Exchange and Citigroup in New York, and two notebooks with information on explosives.

Barot admitted to plotting to bomb the New York Stock Exchange, the International Monetary Fund headquarters, and the World Bank, among other targets. In April 2007 it was revealed that he planned to use limousines packed with explosives and radioactive "dirty" bombs for the attacks.

His co-accused conspirators were: Mohammed Naveed Bhatti, 24; Abdul Aziz Jalil, 31; Omar Abdul Rehman, 20; Junade Feroze, 28; Zia ul Haq, 25; Qaisar Shaffi, 25; and Nadeem Tarmohammed, 26; all Britons of Pakistani origin, most of Mirpuri descent. Much of the information about Barot's role in the planning of further al-Qaeda attacks came from Khalid Shaikh Mohammed, a prominent al-Qaeda operative captured by the Pakistani ISI. A witness stated that he attended Camp Hudaybiyah, run by the Jemaah Islamiyah group, where he was instructed in small arms training, mortars, basic explosives handling, navigation and jungle patrolling.

The prosecution did not dispute claims from the defence that no funding had been received for the projects, nor any vehicles or bomb-making materials acquired.

=== Sentencing ===
On 7 November 2006, Barot was sentenced to life imprisonment, after pleading guilty to conspiracy to murder; it was recommended that he serve a minimum of 40 years. In May 2007, his sentence was reduced to 30 years. The Court of Appeal, headed by Lord Chief Justice Lord Phillips, said that the 40-year sentence was for a terrorist who planned murder by "viable" means. It was also stated that Barot's plot did not amount to an actual attempt and it was uncertain whether it would have succeeded and what the consequences might have been. The Court of Appeal did note that Barot's "businesslike" plans would have caused carnage on a "colossal and unprecedented scale" if they had been successful.

=== Prison attacks ===
In July 2007, Barot was admitted to Newcastle's Royal Victoria Infirmary for five days after being badly injured by other inmates at HMP Frankland. For security reasons a news blackout of the incident was imposed while he was receiving treatment. It was later reported that Barot was treated for burns after two attacks. In the first attack, boiling water was poured on to his back and a fight ensued, in the second attack another prisoner poured boiling oil over his head. Such attacks are called "juggings".
