= List of British detainees at Guantanamo Bay =

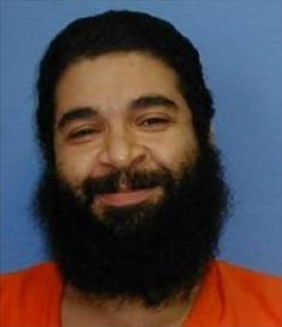
Shaker Aamer, the last British resident released from Guantanamo

The United States Department of Defense held a total of nine British detainees at Guantanamo Bay detention camp. An additional nine detainees were citizens of other nations who had been granted permanent residency status in the United Kingdom.

A total of 778 suspects have been held in the Guantanamo Bay detention camps, in Cuba since the camps opened on January 11, 2002. The camp population peaked in 2004 at approximately 660. Only nineteen new suspects, all "high value detainees" have been transferred there since the United States Supreme Court's ruling in Rasul v. Bush. As of January 6, 2025, 15 detainees remain at Guantanamo Bay.

Five British citizens were repatriated in March 2004, including friends known as the Tipton Three, prior to the start of the Combatant Status Review Tribunals. Shafiq Rasul had been party to a major court challenge under a habeas corpus petition challenging his detention. In Rasul v. Bush (2004), the US Supreme Court ruled that detainees had the right to challenge their detention before an impartial tribunal, one of the first of several landmark cases related to operations at Guantanamo.

All British citizens and residents have been repatriated from Guantanamo. Shaker Aamer was the last British resident to be released, landing on British soil on October 30, 2015.

== British citizens held at Guantanamo Bay ==
isn	name	notes
24	Feroz Abbasi	CSRT highly acrimonious.; Tribunal told him international law did not apply to him.; Released
86	Shafiq Rasul	Released.; Rasul v. Bush (2004) heard by SCOTUS, determined that detainees had the right of an impartial tribunal to hear their challenge to detention; Alleged abuse.
87	Asif Iqbal	Released.; Alleged abuse.
110	Ruhal Ahmed	Released.; Alleged abuse.
490	Jamal Udeen Al-Harith	
534	Tarek Dergoul	
558	Moazzam Begg	Following his release, Begg wrote a book about his detention, entitled Enemy Combatant. He has founded Cageprisoners, an organization representing detainees and helping those who have been released to re-integrate into society.
701	Jamal Abdullah Kiyemba	Joint citizen of the UK and Uganda.
817	Richard Dean Belmar	Released.
10007	Martin Mubanga	Released.
