= Tarek Dergoul =

British Guantanamo detainee (born 1977)

- Born: 11 December 1977 (age 48); Mile End, London, England
- Arrested: fall 2001; Afghan militia
- Released: 2004-03-08; London
- Citizenship: United Kingdom
- Detained at: Guantanamo
- ISN: 534
- Charge: No charge (extrajudicial detention)
- Status: Repatriated 2004-03-08

Tarek Dergoul (born 11 December 1977) is a citizen of the United Kingdom of Moroccan origin who was held in extrajudicial detention in the United States Guantanamo Bay detention camps, in Cuba. He spent six or seven months in US custody in Afghanistan, prior to his arrival at Guantanamo on 5 May 2002. After he was repatriated to the United Kingdom on 8 March 2004, he asserted that conditions in US detention camps were brutal, and he was coerced to utter false confessions.

== Background ==
Dergoul had held a variety of jobs in the UK, including being employed as a care worker at an old age home, and as a mini-cab driver, before traveling to Afghanistan, in 2001, where he was handed over to US forces, and ultimately transferred to Guantanamo.

Dergoul described how he and some friends saw the war as an opportunity, and pooled their funds to become land speculators. The property they purchased from other foreigners, fleeing the war, would be sold for a profit, when peace was restored. Unfortunately, they were on one of those properties, when it was struck by an American bomb, killing his friends and seriously wounding Dergoul.

He was one of the first captives to be repatriated, on 9 March 2004.

Dergoul said injuries from his time in US custody prevented him from working after his return to the UK.

Dergoul sued the British government, claiming its security organizations MI5 and MI6 had been complicit in the interrogations he underwent while in US custody, that violated both the USA's and the UK's obligations under the international human rights agreement.

== Repatration ==
Dergoul, and four other British citizens, Jamal al Harith, Ruhal Ahmed, Asif Iqbal, and Shafiq Rasul, were repatriated in March 2004. After their repatriation, all five men were taken into British custody, under its Prevention of Terrorism Acts.

But all five men were released less than two days after their arrival, and when British authorities were satisfied, there were no grounds for their detention. Four other British citizens, and nine nationals of other nations, who had long term permission to reside in the UK, remained in US custody in Guantanamo.

According to the Sydney Morning Herald, the United States and the United Kingdom spent five months negotiating, before the five men were repatriated.

== Dergoul's first account of his experience in Guantanamo ==
On 16 May 2004, David Rose, writing in The Observer, published an article based on Dergoul's account of life in Guantanamo. Other former captives had offered accounts of how the camp's riot squads, the Guantanamo Emergency Reaction Force, used brutality in an arbitrary and excessive manner. But Dergoul was the first to describe how every time the riot squad deployed, a sixth member of the team stood back to record a video of the event. Camp spokesmen confirmed Dergoul's account that all ERF deployments were filmed, for review by superior officers, and that they were all archived. Politicians in both the United Kingdom and the United States called for the recordings to be made available for review, to see if they did record unnecessary use of force. Rose quoted Senator Patrick Leahy of the Senate Judiciary Committee

If evidence exists that can establish whether there has been mistreatment of prisoners at Guantanamo Bay, it should be provided without delay. That must include any tapes or photos of the activities of the Extreme Reaction Force.

On 15 May 2004, CNN noted Dergoul's role when it reported General Jay Hood, the camp's commandant, brought DVDs of ERF squad incidents when he was called to testify before the Senate Judiciary Committee. After watching the videos camp authorities had selected to show the committee, Leahy concluded that they did not appear to show abuses similar to those revealed by the trophy photos collected and distributed by guards at the Abu Ghraib prison in Iraq.

At a time when the Guantanamo captives were widely described as having been "captured on the battlefield", Dergoul told Rose he had been apprehended by members of an Afghan militia. Dergoul said his Afghan captors traded him to US forces in return for a $5,000 bounty. Dergoul told Rose that half of the captives were, like him, traded to the US for a bounty.

Dergoul described how two Pakistani friends who had partnered with him as real estate speculation, and how this innocent enterprise leads to his wounding, capture, and ultimately, the amputation of his left arm and a big toe. Dergoul's arm was damaged when a large, recently abandoned house he and his partners were considering buying was targeted by a US bomb. His toes became frostbitten. According to Dergoul, his formerly frostbitten toe was badly infected, but his US captors withheld anti-biotics from him, in order to pressure him into confessing to a role in terrorism. Dergoul claimed he did, ultimately, falsely confess to fighting and being captured at Osama bin Laden's mountain redoubt in Tora Bora, rather than in Jalalabad, a major city fifty kilometers and a mountain range away.

Rose noted that former Guantanamo commandant Geoffrey Miller, who had introduced interrogation techniques to Iraq which triggered controversy there, because the USA acknowledged that Iraqi captives were protected by the Geneva Conventions. Rose identified Dergoul as someone who reported being subjected to techniques the USA acknowledged would not be allowed on individuals protected by the Geneva Conventions. In particular, Dergoul had described to Rose being subjected to "short shackling", and other long confinement in "stress positions", "extremes of heat and cold", and sleep deprivation. He described watching other bound captives routinely being beaten into unconsciousness, when he was in US custody in Afghanistan. Dergoul described a technique where guards would deliver him to an interrogation room, where he would be shackled to a chair, or short shackled to a bolt in the floor—and then left alone. Dergoul would describe how the temperature in the interrogation room would be set to painfully cold. He described how the cold would be particularly painful on the stumps left from his amputations. Dergoul described how after being left alone, shackled, all day, he would feel a mounting pressure to void his bladder or move his bowels, and would eventually be forced to soil himself.

== Comments on the first deaths in Guantanamo to be publicly reported ==
On 10 June 2006, camp authorities, less than a month after they published the first official list of the names of the Guantanamo captives, camp authorities announced three men had died, had committed suicide. Historian Andy Worthington, the author of The Guantanamo Files, noted that Dergoul had gone on record that he had been held in cells adjacent to two of the three men, and simply could not believe they could have killed themselves.

== Dergoul sues the UK government over its complicity in his abuse ==
Dergoul had offered accounts of UK government complicity in his abuse from his first interview after his repatriation. On 16 September 2007, Dergoul was the first former captive to sue the UK government. Dergoul's claim was thirteen pages long and focused on the cooperation and active involvement of two of the UK's security agencies -- MI5 and MI6—in his detention and interrogation.

== 2008 McClatchy interview ==
On 15 June 2008, the McClatchy News Service published a series of articles based on interviews with 66 former Guantanamo captives. Tarek Dergoul was one of the former captives who had an article profiling him.

Tarek Dergoul acknowledged traveling to Afghanistan following the al Qaeda's attacks of 11 September 2001. He said he regarded the flight of refugees as a business opportunity. He and some other associates thought they could buy property from fleeing refugees at bargain prices, and then re-sell them when the order was restored. However, he said, his companions were killed, and he was injured, when a shell landed in a villa they were about to buy.

Tarek Dergoul told his McClatchy interviewer he was buried in the rubble, and woke in hospital, to find himself under an armed guard. His left arm was amputated. After some time in Afghan custody, he was sold to the Americans for a $5000 bounty, and transferred to the Bagram Theater internment facility.

Tarek Dergoul reported that when he arrived in Bagram, medical treatment was withheld from him, and then when a doctor oversaw the amputation of one of his toes, pain medication was withheld from him, so that he would still be able to feel pain, when he was next interrogated.

He claimed that he was taken into a medical room where a medical trainee was being instructed in how to amputate his toe. He claimed that he wasn't given anesthesia for the operation. Instead, he said, he was given just enough painkiller to stop the pain from being overwhelming, but not so much that he couldn't answer interrogators when they started asking questions again.

Tarek Dergoul reports that he only became religious during his detention.

== WikiLeaks leaks Dergoul's formerly secret JTF-GTMO assessment ==
Dergoul was repatriated prior to the United States Supreme Court ruling that the Department of Defense had to prepare a list of the allegations used to justify Guantanamo captives' continued detention. But on 25 April 2011, the whistleblower organization WikiLeaks published a formerly secret assessment of 766 current and former captives.

Dergoul's assessment was drafted on 28 October 2003. It was two pages long, it was signed by camp commandant Geoffrey Miller, and it recommended his continued detention.

Historian Andy Worthington incorporated information from Dergoul's assessment in a profile of him he published on 2 August 2011. He noted that JTF-GTMO analysts had concluded "not been cooperative or forthright during his detention," that he had been "assessed as having been recruited to fight on behalf of the Taliban" and as having "probable Al-Qaida affiliations and links with known Al-Qaida supporters in the UK." They concluded he was "of moderate intelligence value to the United States," but posed "a high threat to the US, its interests or its allies."

== Dergoul sentenced to community service ==
In August 2011, Dergoul and a friend were in a shop when they saw his car being given a traffic ticket for being illegally parked. The parking official testified at Dergoul's trial that after the men told him they were searching for the change to recharge the parking meter, he told them it was too late, and the ticket had already been issued. He then testified he crossed the street to capture a picture of the car, only to see Dergoul and his friend charging him. He testified they struck him, pushed him to the ground, and rained kicks and blows upon him.

Dergoul interrupted the proceedings, yelling from the prisoner's dock. He complained that the parking official had escalated the tension by taking photos, and that he feared the parking official was an undercover security official, and the pictures were part of a surveillance campaign.

Dergoul was given a one-year conditional sentence that required him to undergo a mental health assessment, and included six months of community service. He was also fined £30, which was to be paid in an installment to the parking official.

Benjamin Wittes, a legal scholar who focuses on counter-terrorism issues, referred to the controversial issue of competing for assessment as to what percentage of former Guantanamo captives should be considered "Guantanamo recidivists", when he asked whether Dergoul's conviction would make him a recidivist.

== Scholarly comments ==
Dergoul's description of abusive conditions at Guantanamo has been quoted, used as an example, by a number of legal and human rights scholars. In "American Methods: Torture And the Logic of Domination", Kristian Williams quoted Dergoul's account as an instance of an ERF squad being used to punish captives, rather than its mandated use to maintain order and protect the safety of staff and guards.

Human Rights Watch quoted Dergoul four times in its report "The Road to Abu Ghraib": They offered him as an example of a captive who reported being threatened with extraordinary rendition to a torture state, for torture; They offered him as an example of a captive who reported being shackled for so long he was forced to void his bladder or move his bowels; They offered him as an example of a captive who reported being left alone all day in a frigid interrogation room; They offered him as an example of a captive who reported being beaten and pepper-sprayed when he objected to repetitive unnecessary cell searches.

Scholar Alexandra Campbell quoted from Dergoul when she compared the fictional demonization and extrajudicial abuse of Muslims in the Hollywood film The Siege and the abuse that Dergoul described to David Rose in his first interview.

Jeannine Bell, writing in the Indiana Law Journal, asserted Dergoul was lucky not to be beaten unconscious like a nearby captive while he was held in Bagram.

Jody Anstee chose a quote from Dergoul to lead her Ph.D. thesis.

Anthony Lewis, writing in the New York Review of Books, cites Dergoul's description of being made to soil himself as an example of the USA violating the international "Convention Against Torture and Other Cruel, Inhuman, Degrading Treatment or Punishment".

== See also ==
- Bagram torture and prisoner abuse
- Torture
