= List of Guantanamo detainees who were previously Taliban prisoners =

From 2002, nine detainees who were previously Taliban prisoners were being held by the United States as enemy combatants in its Guantanamo Bay detainment camps at its Navy base in Cuba, as part of its war on terror. The Taliban in Afghanistan had jailed each of the 9 based on opposition or suspicion of spying. The United States suspected them of being allied with the Taliban or al-Qaeda and took them into custody, treating them as enemy combatants.

On March 9, 2004, the first of these men had been repatriated and released without being charged with any terror related crime. Private lawyers and public interest groups are working on behalf of remaining detainees to have their cases fully reviewed.

== Background ==
The Taliban took control of Afghanistan and severely suppressed the opposition, as well as providing refuge for militant Muslims, including Osama bin Laden. The Taiban jailed many of their suspects in Kandahar prison, including five of the nine men listed below. In some accounts, they became known as the Kandahar Five.

After the 9/11 attacks in 2001, the United States, with the U.S. Army and allied forces, including the Northern Alliance, invaded Afghanistan in effort to overthrow the Taliban. The Northern Alliance liberated Kandahar prison in December 2001, freeing its 1,500 men. The press visited and met some of the men later taken into custody by the Americans and transported to Guantánamo. "Several of the men have testified that they were "sold" to the Americans by Northern Alliance troops."

The Americans captured many men in Afghanistan; they suspected them of being allied with the Taliban or al-Qaeda and transported them to a detention camp set up at Guantanamo Bay Naval Station for interrogation, in effort to penetrate terrorist networks and prevent future attacks. Among these were at least nine men who had previously been jailed by the Taliban. Clive Stafford Smith, the legal director of Reprieve, "a London-based human rights group representing 39 Guantanamo detainees", struggled to describe the situation, describing it as "Kafkaesque" or "Alice in Wonderland". Subsequently, stated, "It's frankly more than bizarre. It's horrifying."

According to the Associated Press, in June 2007 Commander Jeffrey Gordon, a Department of Defense spokesman, defended the Army's decision to continue to detain some of the men, although by then several had been released without charges:

Multiple reviews and designations have been conducted since each unlawful enemy combatant was captured, to include during initial detention overseas to lengthy procedures at Guantanamo.

Ilkham Turdbyavich Batayev	Used as a kitchen slave by the Taliban.	
Adil Uqla Hassan Al Nusayri		
Abd Al Rahim Abdul Rassak Janko (Syria)	From Syria, he was jailed in Kandahar by the Taliban on suspicion of spying. He is being defended by the attorney Steve Sady from Portland, Oregon, who said his client had given "valuable testimony to U.S. investigators on Taliban abuses and should have received protection" rather than further detention and mistreatment.	
Jamal Udeen Al-Harith (UK)	Having gone to Pakistan for a religious retreat, he tried to leave by land when told it was dangerous and paid a driver to take him to Iran. They were stopped near the Afghanistan border, where the Taliban seized him as a British spy based on his passport.; Americans found him in the Kandahar jail and released him to the Red Cross. Before he could leave, the US Army picked him up on suspicion as an enemy combatant and transported him to Guantanamo Bay. He was finally released on March 9, 2004, and repatriated to Britain, where he was immediately released without charge.	
Siddeeq Ahmad Siddeeq Noor Turkistani (Saudi Arabia)	Turkistani said he was deported by Saudi Arabia to Afghanistan for drug trafficking. There he was imprisoned by the Taliban in Kandahar for four and a half years, on charges of being involved in a plot to kill al Qaeda leader Osama bin Laden. Turkistani admits being opposed to the Taliban, Al Qaeda and Osama bin Laden, but he denies that he was involved in any plots. He was finally released and repatriated to Saudi Arabia, where he was detained for seven months.	
Airat Vakhitov (Russia)	Fled Russia for Tajikistan, in 1999, to avoid harassment by the Russian authorities; was forced by members of the Islamic Movement of Uzbekistan to travel to Afghanistan. He was imprisoned there in Kandahar because the Taliban suspected he was a Russian spy (they thought most foreigners were spies). Released in February 2004, he returned to Tatarstan, Russia, where he has faced suspicion, intermittent detention by authorities, and discrimination as a result of his imprisonment by the Americans. He works as a freelance writer and editor under a pseudonym.	
Abdul Hakim Bukhary (Saudi Arabia)	According to the BBC, Bukhary, from Saudi Arabia, had been jailed by the Taliban for expressing approval of Ahmad Shah Massoud, a Northern Alliance leader assassinated on September 9, 2001. He originally thought the Americans were liberators but was detained by them and interrogated severely.	
Qari Hasan Ulla Peerzai
Arkan Mohammad Ghafil Al Karim (Iraq)	He deserted from the Iraqi Army and was jailed by the Taliban and tortured. He said that he was taken to Guantanamo so the Americans could learn about the Iraq Army before its invasion.	
Rasul Kudayev (Russia)	In Afghanistan, he was imprisoned since 2000 by the Taliban and shot in a prison uprising. He was taken by the Americans to Guantanamo, where he claimed to have been "tortured and humiliated." Since his release and return to Russia, he has been arrested by Russian authorities and charged with "participating in a 2005 raid by Islamic militants in the North Caucasus city of Nalchik. His British-based lawyers say the charge is bogus."	Rashid Awad Rashid Al Uwaydah
Amin Ullah		
Abdul Matin		
Hamidullah		
