= Rasul v. Rumsfeld =

Shafiq Rasul, Asif Iqbal, Ruhal Ahmed, and Jamal Al-Harith, four former Guantánamo Bay detainees, filed suit in 2004 in the United States District Court in Washington, DC against former Secretary of Defense Donald Rumsfeld. They charged that illegal interrogation tactics were permitted to be used against them by Secretary Rumsfeld and the military chain of command. The plaintiffs each sought seek compensatory damages for torture and arbitrary detention while being held at Guantánamo.

Some aspects of the case were dismissed at the District Court level, and the Appeals Court overturned the lower court ruling on coverage of religious protections. In 2008 the United States Supreme Court granted certiorari, vacated the judgment, and remanded the case to the Court of Appeals based on the intervening Boumediene v. Bush (2008), which ruled that detainees and foreign nationals had the habeas corpus right to bring suit in federal courts.

On April 24, 2009, the Court of Appeals dismissed the case again, on the grounds of "limited immunity". It ruled that the courts at the time of the alleged abuses had not yet clearly established prohibitions against the torture and religious abuses suffered by the detainees. On December 14, 2009, the US Supreme Court declined to accept the case for hearing.

== Plaintiffs ==
The four Britons: Shafiq Rasul, Asif Iqbal, and Rhuhel Ahmed, also known as the "Tipton Three," and Jamal Al-Harith, a Manchester-based web designer, are represented by the Center for Constitutional Rights, a legal and educational organization devoted to the protection of human rights both in the United States and abroad, and the law firm of Baach Robinson & Lewis.

According to their own report, Rasul, Iqbal, and Ahmed had traveled to Afghanistan from Pakistan to do humanitarian relief work in the wake of September 11, while Al-Harith had gone to Pakistan for a religious retreat. Rasul, Iqbal, and Ahmed were captured by an Uzbek warlord and transferred to U.S. custody in Afghanistan. Al-Harith was captured by the Taliban in Pakistan and was accused of being a British spy. After the fall of the Taliban, he ended up in U.S. custody after the fall of the Taliban.

None of the plaintiffs had ever taken up arms against the United States, nor been a member of a terrorist group. For more than two years, they were imprisoned without charge in Guantánamo by the United States. During their detention, they "were subjected to repeated beatings, sleep deprivation, extremes of hot and cold, forced nakedness, death threats, interrogations at gun point, menacing with unmuzzled dogs, and religious and racial harassment." In March 2004 they were released and returned to Britain and released without charge.

Shafiq Rasul was the lead plaintiff in Rasul v. Bush (2004). In this landmark case for detainee rights, the US Supreme Court ruled that the detainees in Guantánamo, and foreign nationals in general, have the right to judicial review of their detentions by the U.S. court system under habeas corpus.

== Representation in other media ==
Shafiq Rasul, Asif Iqbal, and Rhuhel Ahmed were featured in The Road to Guantánamo (2006) a docu-drama by Michael Winterbottom about their experiences based on their published account, beginning with their trip to Pakistan, through their detention at Guantánamo.

== Charges ==
The plaintiffs charge that Secretary of Defense Donald Rumsfeld, the Chairmen of the Joint Chiefs of Staff, and senior military officers who are responsible for the treatment of Guantánamo detainees had approved interrogation techniques that were known to violate U.S. and international law. The alleged practices include torture; cruel, inhuman or degrading treatment; prolonged arbitrary detention; cruel and unusual punishment; preventing the exercise and expression of religious beliefs, and denial of liberties without due process. These are seen to be in violation of the Alien Tort Statute (ATS), the Fifth and Eighth Amendments to the U.S. Constitution, the Geneva Conventions, and the Religious Freedom Restoration Act (RFRA).

"This is the first case demanding accountability from the government officials who condoned and perpetrated torture and abuse at Guantanamo," said CCR attorney Emi Maclean. "Our courts need to show the world - and the U.S. government - that it takes the documented abuse of detainees in U.S. custody seriously."

== Timeline of the case ==
- October 27, 2004: Rasul v. Rumsfeld was filed in the United States District Court for the District of Columbia by the Center for Constitutional Rights and Baach Robinson & Lewis law firm on behalf of Shafiq Rasul, Asif Iqbal, Rhuhel Ahmed, and Jamal Al-Harith.
- March 16, 2005: Defendants filed a motion to dismiss the case based on lack of subject matter jurisdiction.
- February 6, 2006: D.C. District Court issued a memorandum opinion dismissing both the plaintiffs' international law and constitutional claims. As administrative remedies had not been exhausted, the international law claims were not ripe. Since the defendants were acting within the scope of their employment, they receive qualified immunity for the constitutional claims.
- May 8, 2006: D.C. District Court issued a memorandum opinion denying the defendants' motion to dismiss the Religious Freedom Restoration Act (RFRA) claim, indicating that Guantánamo is subject to the RFRA. In his ruling, District Judge Ricardo M. Urbina addresses the scope of RFRA by saying, "Flushing the Koran down the toilet and forcing Muslims to shave their beards falls comfortably within the conduct prohibited from government action."
- January 11, 2008: United States Court of Appeals for the District of Columbia Circuit dismissed the case, reversing the decision made by the district court that the Religious Freedom Restoration Act is applicable to Guantánamo, and affirming the dismissal by the district court of the constitutional and international law claims. Circuit Judge Karen LeCraft Henderson, joined by Circuit Judge A. Raymond Randolph, wrote for the majority, while Circuit Judge Janice Rogers Brown wrote a partial concurrence. The Religious Freedom Restoration Act was deemed inapplicable as detainees were ruled not to be "persons" for purposes of U.S. law, and claims under the Geneva Conventions and the Alien Tort Statute were dismissed as defendants were immune since, "torture is a foreseeable consequence of the military's detention of suspected enemy combatants," and they could not have known that the detainees had constitutional rights.
- December 15, 2008: the Supreme Court of the United States granted the plaintiffs' petition for certiorari, vacated the judgment and remanded the case to the D.C. Circuit for further consideration in light of Boumediene v. Bush (20xx)
- April 24, 2009: the Court of Appeals dismissed the case based on "limited immunity", saying the courts had not clearly established that behaviors suffered by the detainees were prohibited at the time.
- December 14, 2009: The US Supreme Court declined to review the case.
