= Foreign fighters in the Iraqi conflict =

Foreign fighters have fought on both sides of the Iraqi civil war and the broader Iraqi conflict.

== Reasons ==
=== Jihadism ===
Many of the foreign fighters in Syria and Iraq were drawn to the jihadist ideology, although experts note that religion is not the only motivation:

From ignorant novices who view the trips as a rite of passage, die-hard militants looking for combat and martyrdom, and individuals who go for humanitarian reasons but get drawn into conflict, individuals become foreign fighters for a range of reasons: boredom; intergenerational tensions; the search for greater meaning in life; perceived adventure; attempts to impress the local community or the opposite sex; a desire for increased credibility; to belong or gain peer acceptance; revenge; or misguided conflict experience expectations.

=== Mercenaries and private contractors ===
In addition to volunteer foreign fighters, there are several private military companies operating in Iraq and Syria, such as the Wagner Group and the Slavonic Corps.

== Islamic State foreign fighters ==
According to figures collected by the Soufan Group in 2016, between 27,000 and 31,000 people including women and children who would not normally engage in conflict had traveled to Syria and Iraq to join the Islamic State and other extremist groups fighting in the region. One reason suggested for the influx of foreigners in the fight is that the Syrian government took no steps to curtail the inflow of foreigners moving into Iraq during the Iraqi insurgency. Their numbers continued to increase, however, and by 2013 may have numbered more than 11,000. The Turkish border was how most jihadis entered Syria.

An October 2016 World Bank study found that "ISIL's foreign fighters are surprisingly well-educated." Using the fighters' self-reported educational levels, the study concluded that "69% of recruits reported at least a secondary-level education" of which "a large fraction have gone on to study at university" and also that "only 15% of recruits left school before high school; less than 2% are illiterate." The study also found that foreign fighters are often more educated than their countrymen where those "from Europe and in Central Asia have similar levels of education to their countrymen" while those "from the Middle East, North Africa, and South and East Asia are significantly more educated than what is typical in their home nations." The report notes that its conclusions that terrorism is not driven by poverty and low levels of education does not conform with previous research. However, the report did find a strong correlation "between a country's male unemployment rate and the propensity of the country to supply foreign fighters" leading the report to recommend that governments pursue a policy of lowering the unemployment rate among the educated as a counter-terrorism strategy.

== Origins of foreign fighters ==
Fighters include those from the Gulf Arab States, the Levant, the Maghreb, Turkey, Egypt, Sudan, the Muslim regions of Eastern Africa, the Muslim regions of the Balkans (especially Bosnia and Herzegovina, Kosovo and Albania), the Muslim regions of Russia (especially the North Caucasus), the Muslim regions of Southeast Asia, and many Western countries.

A 7 December 2015 report by the Soufan Group gave estimates for the number of foreign fighters in Syria and Iraq by their country and region of origin based on information dated between 2014 and 2015. The study, which only included foreign fighters with the Islamic State, the al-Nusra Front and other Sunni jihadist factions, listed the countries with the largest number of foreign fighters were Tunisia (6000), Saudi Arabia (2500), Russia (2400), Turkey (2100), Jordan (2000+) while the number of fighters by region was reported to be: the Middle East (8240), the Maghreb (8000), Western Europe (5000), former Soviet Republics (4700), Southeast Asia (900), the Balkans (875), and North America (289).

Of Western Europe's estimated 5000 total fighters, almost 4000 fighters were produced by just five Western European countries: France (1700), Germany (760), the United Kingdom (760), Belgium (470) and Sweden (300). Between 2014 and 2015, the report estimated a nearly 300% increase in the number of fighters originating from Russia and Central Asia whereas the total number of fighters traveling to Syria and Iraq had become "relatively flat." The report mentioned that the flow of foreign fighters "is neither uniform by region nor by country," with some countries having distinguishable "Hotbeds of recruitment" with some hotbeds, such as the Lisleby district of Norway's Fredrikstad which is populated by only 6000 people, being small and relatively new while other cities and regions, such as Tunisia's Bizerte and Ben Gardane, Libya's Derna, Georgia's Pankisi Gorge, and Brussel's Molenbeek, "are well-established incubators and radiators of extremist behavior."

The Soufan Group reported on 15 October 2016 that there has been "a significant increase in the number of foreign fighters travelling to Syria" since 2014. The U.S. State Department reported on 2 June 2016 that their "intelligence community" estimates that possibly "in excess of 40,000 total foreign fighters have gone to the conflict [in Syria] and from over 100 countries".

The phenomenon causes concerns in the home countries of the foreign fighters. The phenomenon is not new, but the size and variety of origins in this case were unusual.

== Arab world ==
In 2012, it was reported that most recruits to Syria are Arabs (Lebanese, Iraqis, Jordanians, Palestinians, Kuwaitis, Tunisians, Libyans, Algerians, Egyptians, Saudis, Sudanese and Yemenis). The largest contingents of about 500-900 fighters came from Syria's neighbors: Lebanese, Iraqis, Palestinians and Jordanians, many of whom fought U.S. forces in Iraq. The second-largest contingent was from Arab countries in North Africa: around 75-300 fighters from Libya, Tunisia, and Algeria. Al Qaeda leader Ayman al-Zawahiri called for a jihad in Syria with the main target of message said to be Lebanon, Jordan, Turkey and Iraq.

=== Gulf states ===
Bahraini Shia youth traveled to receive Iranian training in camps and battlefronts in Iran, Lebanon, Iraq, and Syria.

=== Libya ===
Towards the end of 2014, the city of Derna reportedly swore allegiance to the Islamic State, the first outside Syria or Iraq.

== Iran ==
In 2018, Tehran said that 2,100 Iranian soldiers have been killed in Syria and Iraq over the past seven years.

== Georgia ==
According to Georgia's State Security Service, around 50 Georgian citizens, principally from the Kist (Chechen)-populated Pankisi Gorge, had joined the Islamist groups in Syria and Iraq as of June 2016. By June 2017, at least 25 citizens of Georgia have died in these conflicts.

== China ==
=== Jihadist foreign fighters ===
Uyghurs appeared in an Islamic State film. Uyghur children appeared in an Islamic State video. The Islamic State Uyghur members attacked the "moderate Syrian rebel" members who were allied to the Turkistan Islamic Party. The Turkistan Islamic Party, linked to Al-Qaeda, was criticized by the Islamic State video. Children with weapons appeared in the video. Iraq was the location of the footage. The Islamic State's number of Uyghur fighters is much smaller than that of the Turkistan Islamic Party's.

== Central Asia ==
A few Kazakhs have joined the Islamic State in Syria and Iraq. the Islamic State released a video called "Race Toward Good" showing Kazakh children being trained as fighters. The families of Kazakh fighters have accompanied them to Syria including children and women. Many Kazakhs who lived under the Islamic State were women and children who were forcibly brought to Syria. The United Nations presented in 2019 Kazakhstan's repatriation initiative for other countries to model.

Uzbek Jihadist groups reportedly operated four training camps located Iraq and Syria in 2015.

The Uzbek group Katibat al Imam al Bukhari, also called Imam Bukhari Jamaat, has separate groups in Syria and Adghanistan. It pledged allegiance to the Taliban in 2015. Uzbek foreign fighters have flocked to Katibat Imam al-Bukhari. Salahuddin al-Uzbeki is the leader of Imam Bukhari Jamaat and his son Umar, a 16 year old teenager, died while fighting in Aleppo against the Syrian military. A member of Imam Bukhari Jamaat defended the utilization of child soldiers. On the VK social networking website, an illustration of a militant aiming an RPG at Santa Claus' flying sleigh was posted by Imam Bukhari Jamaat in 2015. Child soldiers were being drilled by Imam Bukhari Jamaat in 2016. They battled in Aleppo and Latakia's Jabal al Akrad region. The group participated in the Siege of al-Fu'ah and Kafriya.

The Islamic State has also recruited hundreds of Tajiks from Tajikistan to fight in Iraq as well. Once the Central Asians died in battle, their wives were given to other fighters.

== Former Yugoslavia ==
In September 2014, a total of 48 ethnic Albanians from several countries were killed fighting in Syria and Iraq. According to the Kosovar Centre for Security Studies, around 60 Kosovar fighters have been killed in combat as of March 2016. As of March 2016, the Albanian Government estimates that over 100 Albanian citizens have joined militant groups in Syria and Iraq, 18 of whom have been killed and 12 wounded.

In total, approximately 240 to 320 Bosnians and their family members traveled to Iraq and Syria between 2012 and 2016 to join extremist groups such as ISIS, and several figures like Husein ‘Bilal’ Bosnić and Bajro Ikanović were involved in recruiting or leading fighters.

Approximately 320 Bosnians, including adults and children, traveled to Iraq and Syria to join extremist groups; of these, around 88–130 Bosnians were killed, about 46–50 returned to Bosnia, and over 90 remained in the conflict zones or disappeared.

== Russia ==
Besides Jaish al-Muhajireen wal-Ansar, numerous other small factions and groups involving Russian-speaking foreign fighters, including some with links to the North Caucasus, are active in parts of Syria and Iraq. As of September 2015, according to Russian Civic Chamber's commission on public diplomacy and compatriots abroad, approximately 2,500 Russian nationals and 7,000 citizens of other post-Soviet republics were fighting alongside the Islamic State.

== Southeast Asia ==
Indonesia and Malaysia are the main source of foreign fighters from Southeast Asia with an estimated 500 Indonesians and 200 Malaysians have travelling to Syria to fight for the Islamic State. It is also suspected that more than 200 Filipinos, mostly the members of Abu Sayyaf (ASG) and Bangsamoro Islamic Freedom Fighters (BIFF) are training and fighting in Iraq and Syria under Islamic State.

In March 2019, the Malaysian Government has announced that it would allow Malaysian foreign fighters to return provided that they comply with checks and enforcement and complete a one-month government-run rehabilitation programme. This rehabilitation program involves returnees being examined by psychologists and clerics. Ayob Khan Mydin Pitchay, the counter-terrorism head of the Malaysian Special Branch, has confirmed that 11 Malaysians have returned including eight men, a woman, and two young children. The men were charged in court and convicted while the woman attended a rehabilitation programme.

== Western countries ==
=== Belgium ===
As an ICCT report from April 2016 shows, Belgium had the highest per-capita foreign fighter contingent. The estimated number is between 420 and 516 individuals. This group consists of a wide age range, with people between 14 and 69 years old – with an average of 25.7. Moroccan-born IS recruiter Khalid Zerkani recruited 72 young individuals with migrant backgrounds of whom most were petty criminals. He encouraged them to steal from non-Muslims in order to finance their journeys to join the caliphate.

=== Denmark ===
According to the Danish Security and Intelligence Service (PET), c. 125 people have left the country since 2011 to travel to the Syria/Iraq war zone where the majority joined the Islamic State. As of April 2016, 27 of those who went are confirmed to have died and some deaths were due to participating in suicide attacks. A minority of those who went to groups who opposed Islamist organizations. The majority of those who joined the conflict were young Sunni Muslims of whom some were converts. Those who went were part of the Islamist scenes in Copenhagen, Aarhus and Odense. Of the 22 who travelled from Aarhus, all came from the Grimhøj mosque.

In 2019–2020, the government of Denmark changed the law so that dual citizens fighting for the Islamic State more easily can lose their Danish citizenship, and children born in the conflict zone to Danish dual citizens or where only one parent is a Danish citizen will no longer automatically receive Danish citizenship.

=== Finland ===
The ICCT report from April 2016 showed that at least 70 individuals had left Finland to enter the conflict zone and the male-female ratio being about 80-20%. The majority of those were in the late teens-mid twenties age group with a third being older than thirty and up to about fifty.

=== France ===
An ICCT report shows that more than 900 people had travelled from France to Syria and/or Iraq by October 2015. There is no profile that defines a French foreign fighter, except for mostly young males with a criminal record; foreign fighters come from different regions and socio-economic environments. About 200 were female and a few were entire families who intended to settle in the occupied territories of the Islamic State.

In 2015 the USMA Combating Terrorism Center identified 32 French facilitators who supported individuals intending to join jihadist groups in the Middle East.

By 2015, 14 of the foreign fighters from France had either died in suicide bombings or expressed their willingness to do so. In Iraq and Syria foreign fighters from France numbered around 689 in 2017 according to the French government.

In May 2019, four French citizens were sentenced to death by an Iraqi court for joining the Islamic State. One of the convicts had served in the French army from the year 2000, and had done a tour in Afghanistan in 2009 and left the army in 2010.

=== Germany ===
For Germany, the estimation is that between 720 and 760 people had travelled to Syria and/or Iraq. 40 percent of this group holds only German citizenship, while another 20 percent holds dual citizenship of which one is German.

In 2017, the federal police of Germany estimated that between 60% and two thirds of IS fighters coming from Germany had a criminal record, with the vast majority (98%) being repeat offenders with an average of 7.6 crimes per individual. In February 2019, Katrin Göring-Eckardt from the Green party encouraged the government of Germany to bring German citizens who had fought for the Islamic State back to Germany. The interior minister of Bavaria, Joachim Herrmann (CSU), encouraged the government to strip IS terrorists of their German citizenship. In April 2019, Germany changed the law so German citizens with dual citizenship who fight with foreign terrorist militias can be stripped of their German citizenship.

In August 2019, US President Donald Trump threatened to release over 2,000 captured the Islamic State fighters into France and Germany if US’ European allies did not repatriate "their" citizens-turned-terrorists. Of 778 individuals who had travelled to the conflict zone from Germany, 504 or nearly two thirds, had criminal convictions and 32% of those had been sentenced for 5 crimes or more.

=== Ireland ===
According to media reports, Garda and the Directorate of Military Intelligence are monitoring between 30 and 60 potential Islamist fighters both in the Irish state and Irish citizens fighting abroad in Syria and Iraq.

Security sources estimated that some 20 fighters may have returned to Ireland as of November 2015.

=== Italy ===
The wife of Moroccan kickboxer Abderrahim Moutaharrik—who was imprisoned in 2017 for allegedly having links to the Islamic State and was deported from Italy to Morocco for security concerns.

=== The Netherlands ===
As of April 2016, 220 people had left to go to Syria/Iraq. The majority of them were male and under 25. The Parliament of Netherlands voted in 2016 for legislation to strip Dutch citizens who join the Islamic State or al Qaeda abroad of their citizenship, also if they have not been convicted of any crime. The law can only be applied to individuals with double citizenship. Justice Minister Ard Van der Steur stated the legal changes were necessary to stop jihadists from returning to the Netherlands. In September 2017, four jihadists were stripped of their citizenship.

In 2017 the Dutch security service AIVD approximated the number of female jihadists in the Netherlands to about 100 and at least 80 women had left the Netherlands to join the conflict, the majority of whom joined the Islamic State. When the military pressure increased on jihadist groups in Syra and Iraq, Netherlands-originating women tried to flee the area. In the 2012-November 2018 period, above 310 individuals had travelled from the Netherlands to the conflict in Syria and Iraq. Of those 85 had been killed and 55 returned to the Netherlands. Of the surviving Dutch foreign fighters in the region, 135 are fighters in the conflict zone and three quarters are members of the Islamic State.

=== New Zealand ===
In mid-October 2014, the-then Prime Minister John Key confirmed that several New Zealand foreign fighters had joined various Middle Eastern factions including the Islamic State. That same month, the New Zealand Government approved "terms of references" allowing the Department of Internal Affairs to suspend the passports of prospective foreign fighters and the New Zealand Security Intelligence Service to conduct video surveillance of those individuals.

In December 2014, the Fifth National Government of New Zealand passed a Countering Terrorist Fighters Legislation Act with the support of the Labour, ACT, and United Future parties which amended three existing laws to give the NZSIS greater powers of surveillance and the Minister of Internal Affairs greater powers to cancel and suspend passports. In October 2016, Key also confirmed that several New Zealand foreign "jihadis" and "jihadi brides" had traveled to Syria and Iraq to join the Islamic State. He confirmed that some had traveled via Australia and that some had dual citizenship. By December 2018, the New Zealand Herald reported that eight individuals had their passports cancelled, withdrawn, or applications denied under the Counter Terrorist Fighters Legislation Act.

=== Norway ===
About 70 people have left Norway to become foreign fighters in Syria or Iraq, while around 20 have returned. It is estimated that at least 124 people have travelled from Denmark to Syria and/or Iraq since January 2011.

In February 2019, Prime Minister Erna Solberg said that fighters who return to Norway will be investigated by police and face criminal charges.

In May 2019 it was announced that both men and women who had joined the Islamic State who only had residence permits in Norway would have their permits annulled to prevent them from returning to Norway. In September 2019, 15 foreigners in Norway had their residence permits revoked.

=== Poland ===
In 2015, about 20-40 Polish citizens were believed to have travelled to the conflict zone, most of them at the time did not live in Poland but in other European countries. One of those carried out a suicide attack on an oil refinery in June 2015.

=== Spain ===
An ICCT report shows that more than 139 people have travelled from Spain to Syria and/or Iraq by November 2015 with about 10% of those being female.

A detailed analysis of 20 fighters who had joined before 2014 showed that eleven of those were Spanish citizens and the remaining were Moroccans living in Spain. Most of those who joined lived in the Ceuta enclave in North Africa, but also Girona and Malaga. At the time of departure, most were married with children and were either students or low-skilled workers. Several were known to police for drug trafficking. Of those 20, three Muslim Spanish from Ceuta became suicide bombers.

In a joint operation in mid-March, Spanish and Moroccan security services targeted an al Qaeda recruiting network and arrested four suspected members in Spain and three others in Morocco. The network, whose activities extend to Morocco, Belgium, France, Tunisia, Turkey, Libya, Mali, Indonesia, and Syria, is headed by Melilla resident Mustafa Maya Amaya, who funneled recruits to the Islamic State, the Nusra Front and al Qaeda in the Islamic Maghreb (AQIM).

=== Sweden ===
In February 2019, the prime minister of Sweden Stefan Löfven announced that Swedish authorities had discouraged travel to the conflict zone in Syria since 2011. The prime minister also said that Swedish authorities would offer no help or assistance to people who had joined or fought the Islamic State. In March 2019, Swedish Television conducted a survey of 41 Islamic State fighters who had returned of whom 12 were women. A third of those who returned to Sweden have since been convicted of serious crimes such as attempted murder, money laundering, extortion, drug offences, fraud, aggravated assault and tax evasion. Michael Skråmo, a Norwegian-Swedish fighter for the Islamic State who resided in Sweden, was killed in March 2019.

In June 2019, it was reported that four foreign fighters who had returned from the conflict in Middle East had become employees of the Islamic charter school Vetenskapsskolan which is funded by tax payers. Two of them were women who followed their children to live among groups affiliated to the Islamic State.

=== United Kingdom ===
The Rayat al-Tawheed group is composed of British combatants linked to the Islamic State of Iraq and the Levant. The suffix "al-Britani" was adopted by British Islamist fighters. In May 2014, a British citizen was killed in fighting. The Free Syrian Army's Abdullah al-Bashir asserted that British fighters were the largest foreign contingent of Islamic State of Iraq and the Levant, according to Iran's Alalamn News.

During Ramadan 2014, over 140 Imams led by Shahid Raza of Leicester Central Mosque signed an open letter asking British Muslims not to travel to Syria (as well as the Islamic State conflict that had spread to Iraq at the time). Additionally, they were urged to make donations to people in the country from the U.K. itself with one such.

An Islamic State video released by British-based Abu Muthanna al Yemeni said "We have brothers from Bangladesh, from Iraq, from Cambodia, Australia, U.K." Around Raqqa, Siddhartha Dhar, a British citizen of Indian roots, was named the lead executioner in an IS film showing the executions of alleged British spies.

Around Mosul a suicide bombing was carried out by a past inmate of Guantanamo called Jamal al Harith. His original name was Ronald Fiddler, and he also called himself Abu Zakariya. Britain's Conservative government had given him one million pounds over his time in Guantanamo. Fiddler's parents were Jamaican. He went to Tell Abyad.

The United Kingdom stripped some of the ISIL fighters of their UK citizenship to prevent them from returning. The Crown Prosecution Service warned in 2014 that "any British resident travelling to take part in fighting will face criminal charges", although Charles Farr, head of the Office for Security and Counter-Terrorism, said that the government did not want to target those with humanitarian aims, and would exercise judgement in such cases.

=== United States ===
2016 VOA report about Americans joining the Peshmerga against IS

The numbers of fighters for the Islamic State from the United States is not known. On October 1, 2020, the United States Department of Justice said that they have successfully repatriated 27 Americans from Syria and Iraq. Zulfi Hoxha, also known as "Abu Hamza al-Amriki", is an American foreign fighter for the Islamic State who had beheaded Peshmerga soldiers in February 2016 and had threatened the United States during the Battle of Mosul in May 2017. Mohammad Hamzeh Khan arrested by the United States while leaving to join the Islamic State, declared that the Islamic State had established the perfect Islamic state and that he felt obligated to "migrate" there. Ahmad Khan, an American teenager, was to meet a member of the Islamic State in Turkey. Another young American, of 17 years-old, acknowledged distributing nearly 7 thousand tweets in support of the Islamic State, as well as aiding the immigration of another youth to Syria.

== South Asia ==
=== Pakistan ===
The Iran-backed and IRGC-affiliated Shia Pakistani Zainabiyoun brigade fought in Iraq against ISIL during the War in Iraq (2013–17) with other foreign Shia fighters to defend and protect holy sites and Iraqi people from the ISIL.

After the fall of the Assad regime, Hundreds of fighters from the Iran-Backed Fatemiyoun and Zainabiyoun were warehoused inside complexes in the Al-Qa'im Bases and Camp Ashraf (also known as the Martyr Abu Munthadher al-Muhammadawi Camp) in Iraq's Diyala province by groups affiliated with the Popular Mobilization Forces and Islamic Resistance in Iraq.

=== India ===
The limited involvement of Indian Muslim fighters in calls for global jihad was observed during the Soviet–Afghan War, and various reasons have been given for this. These include the limited influence of Salafi-Wahabbism in India, inability of IS sympathizers in India to travel to IS controlled territories due to logistical factors and poverty among Indian Muslims, the existing presence of Pakistani militant groups such as Lashkar-e-Taiba and Jaish-e-Muhammad with which the IS is in open strife, and the opposition of Indian Islamic leadership to such groups (with 70,000 Barelvi clerics issuing a fatwa condemning IS and similar organisations in 2015).

== Reactions ==
=== International ===
The governments of Malaysia, Indonesia, the Philippines and Thailand were concerned about returning fighters. On at least one occasion Malaysian reports indicated that Islamic State supporter terrorist groups have emerged to stake a claim over parts of mainland Southeast Asia. While some arrests were made, some of them had fled to the Philippines to forge an alliance with Abu Sayyaf, which is one of the Filipino terrorist group notourious for kidnapping, beheading and extortion. Many of the terrorists fled from Malaysia are believed to be not a Malaysian citizens, but instead were either Filipino and Indonesian nationalities who have disguised as a Malaysians by using fake identities. Malaysia's first suicide bomber attack occurred under the auspices of the Islamic State (though in Iraq).

In 2014, U.S. Senator Ted Cruz introduced the Expatriate Terrorist Act which would allow the federal government go to court to revoke the citizenship of those who joins or aids a designated foreign terrorist group. He cited his view that it was "necessary" to prevent citizens to fight for the Islamic State from returning to carry out "unspeakable acts of terror here at home."

In November 2014, the United Nations Security Council adopted Resolution 2178 which focused on how states should deal with the foreign fighter phenomenon. The Resolution presents a holistic approach to the problem and therefore stresses to not only focus on military and intelligence solutions, but incorporate preventative and rehabilitative measures as well. Furthermore, governments are encouraged to developed counter narratives together with communities and NGO's.

Governments have adopted a wide range of policies and measures in order to deal with the issue of foreign fighters. Measures change per country, and focus for example on prevention, law enforcement or rehabilitation and reintegration. For example, informative hotlines have been set up as well as implementation of the deprivation of citizenship. With a focus on more preventative measures, countries have developed programs that focus on inter-cultural and inter-religious dialogue as well the use of counter-narratives.

=== Other ===
==== Analysis ====
Shahriman Lockman of the Malaysia-based Institute of Strategic & International Studies said of the return of fighters: "It is worrisome, yes. If they wanted a safe haven for their training and operations, they could easily go to the numerous failed states in Africa. But they chose to operate from Malaysia, where the risk of being under surveillance is much higher."

In his 28 May 2017 Face the Nation interview, US Secretary of Defense James Mattis announced a shift from "attrition" to "annihilation" tactics in the fight against the Islamic State; according to Mattis, the intention is "that the foreign fighters do not survive the fight to return home to North Africa, to Europe, to America, to Asia, to Africa."

== See also ==
- List of armed groups in the Syrian Civil War
- Final Report of the Task Force on Combating Terrorist and Foreign Fighter Travel
- Military activity of the Islamic State
