= Al-Ameriki =

Al-Ameriki or Al-Amriki is an Arabic title meaning the American. It may refer to:

- Abu Hamza al-Amriki (born 1992), nom de guerre of Zulfi Hoxha, American Islamic State commander
- Bashir al-Ameriki (born 1983), alternative name of Bryant Neal Vinas, American Al-Qaeda member
