= Sadik Ahmad Turkistani =

Saudi Uyghur detainee of the Taliban and United States

- Born: Saudi Arabia
- Arrested: 2001
- Released: 2006-06-24
- Citizenship: Turkmenistan
- Detained at: Guantanamo
- ISN: 491
- Charge(s): no charge, extrajudicial detention
- Status: determined not to have been an "enemy combatant"

Sadik Ahmad Turkistani is an ethnic Uyghur born and raised in Taif, Saudi Arabia and an opponent of the Taliban. Held by the Taliban in Kandahar prison in Afghanistan, he was briefly freed when they were overthrown in late 2001.

One of the Kandahar Five, he was taken into custody by the Americans and shipped to Guantanamo Bay detention camp, Cuba in early 2002, where he was treated as an enemy combatant. Finally he was cleared for release in late 2005. He was repatriated to Saudi Arabia on June 24, 2006.

== Imprisoned by Taliban ==
Turkistani was imprisoned by the Taliban for four and a half years, during which time he suffered torture and mistreatment at Kandahar prison. He was alleged to have been involved in a plot to kill al Qaeda leader Osama bin Laden. Turkistani admits being opposed to the Taliban, Al Qaeda and Osama bin Laden, but he denies that he was involved in any plots. The Taliban imprisoned many foreigners on the assumption they were spies.

When the Northern Alliance liberated Kandahar prison, they freed about 1500 men; as many as 2000 had been held there. Turkistani was among five former prisoners at Kandahar who said they were sold to the US forces by the Northern Alliance for a bounty. He was taken into US custody and transported to Guantanamo, where he was treated as an enemy combatant.

Turkistani was one of nine former Taliban prisoners whom the Associated Press noted had suffered going from Taliban custody, where they had been accused of spying or opposition, to American custody and transport to detention and more torture at Guantanamo. One of their defense lawyers described their ordeals as beyond bizarre and "horrific."

== Read into the Senate records ==
During a debate in 2005 on Senator Lindsey Graham's motion to prevent detainees having access to the US courts, Senator Jeff Bingaman had several Washington Post articles on the plight of the Uyghur detainees read into the Senate Record. One of the articles featured Turkistani. (Note: The US Supreme Court decision in Boumediene v. Bush (2008) ruled that detainees and other foreign nationals could have access to US courts under habeas corpus.)

== Not an enemy combatant ==
The Washington Post reports that Turkistani was one of 38 detainees who was determined not to have been an enemy combatant during his Combatant Status Review Tribunal (CSRT). They reported that Turkistani was one of several still not released.

On May 10, 2006 Radio Free Asia quoted from an interview with Abu Bakker Qassim, one of the five Uighurs who had been transported to Albania on May 5, 2006. Qassim said he left four innocent detainees behind at Camp Iguana: a Russian, an Algerian, a Libyan, and a man who had been born in Saudi Arabia to Uighur exiles.

== Turkistani's garden ==
Turkistani is reported to have told his lawyer, Sabin Willett, that he and fellow prisoners had planted a garden with seeds saved from their rations. Turkistani and the other men in Camp Iguana cultivated their clandestine garden with plastic spoons.

== Transfer to Saudi Arabia ==
On June 25, 2006, 14 men were repatriated to Saudi Arabia from Guantanamo. While some press reports described these men as 14 Saudis, others described them as 13 Saudis, and a Turkistani who had been resident in Saudi Arabia.

By January 2009, Turkistani had settled again in his native Taif. He was planning to marry, and to open his own business.
