= 2015 Boston beheading plot =

Terrorist attempt in the United States

- Location: Boston, Massachusetts, U.S.
- Date: June 2015
- Target: Pamela Geller; Police officers
- Attack type: Plotted beheading
- Deaths: 1 (one of the perpetrators)
- Injuries: 0
- Perpetrators: Usaama Rahim, David Wright, Nicholas Rovinski

An attack was plotted by Boston-area resident Usaama Rahim. Rahim initially planned to behead Pamela Geller but when that proved too difficult, he told his nephew David Wright on June 2, 2015, that he had decided to behead a police officer instead. However, Rahim was under 24-hour police surveillance, and the police moved that day to arrest Rahim. During the attempted arrest, the police shot and killed Rahim. Wright was arrested and initially charged with attempting to destroy evidence. Later, a third man, Nicholas Rovinski, was arrested, and both Wright and Rovinski were charged with conspiracy to provide material support to the Islamic State of Iraq and the Levant (ISIL).

== Investigation ==
The FBI said that Rahim had been under surveillance since at least late May, when he bought three knives on Amazon.com. On May 26, investigators recorded Rahim telling Wright that he had bought a knife that was "good for carving" and referring to "thinking with your head on your chest", which the FBI said was a reference to beheading. Investigators said both Wright and Rahim were followers of a violent form of Islamic extremism. Chairman Michael McCaul of the House Homeland Security Committee said that Rahim had been under investigation because he had been communicating with ISIS and spreading ISIS propaganda online. According to CNN, his Twitter feed showed that he had been communicating with Mujahid Miksi, an alias for Mohamed Abdullahi Hasan, a Minnesota man fighting with Al-Shabaab. According to a court affidavit, Wright later told investigators that he agreed with Rahim's plot and supported it.

=== Jihadist connections ===
According to The Atlantic, although Wright, Rahim and Rovinski were regarded as isolated, lone wolf actors at the time of their arrests, it later emerged that the three were "part of a wider network that was in communication with Islamic State operatives in Syria." In 2015 Rahim and Wright provided the arrangements and raised the funds that enabled American would-be jihadi Zulfi Hoxha to travel to Syria, where he became a significant figure in ISIS.

== Shooting ==
At 7 a.m. on June 2, 2015, Rahim was walking to a bus stop and then approached by six plainclothes law enforcement officers at a CVS Pharmacy parking lot in the Roslindale neighborhood in Boston. The officers attempted to serve Rahim an arrest warrant for alleged threats against police officers. Rahim was reportedly wielding a military-style knife at the officers, and the officers backed away. Two officers, a police officer and an FBI agent, discharged their firearms. Three shots were fired, striking Rahim. The shooting was recorded inside a nearby Burger King restaurant, and shows Rahim being obscured by a light pole when he was shot. Authorities have stated that the officers made demands that Rahim drop his weapon but he refused. Rahim's family stated that he was shot in the back, although authorities said Rahim lunged at the officers and was the aggressor in the altercation.

== Aftermath ==
After Usaama Rahim was shot, his brother Ibrahim Rahim wrote on Facebook that Usaama was confronted by police at a bus stop while on a cell phone with their father. Ibrahim also wrote that Usaama had been shot three times in the back. That post began gaining acceptance, but police countered it by stating that Usaama Rahim had lunged at officers with a large knife and was shot in the front. Police Commissioner William Evans said the video showed the police retreating 15 or 20 yards while ordering Usaama to drop his weapon. The police showed community leaders a video of the shooting. After watching the video, Darnell Williams, president of the Urban League, said the video corroborated the police account—that Rahim was not on his cell phone and had not been shot in the back. Ibrahim Rahim also backed away from his earlier post after seeing the video.

== Nicholas Rovinski arrest ==
On June 11, 2015, the FBI arrested Nicholas Rovinski, also known as Nuh Amriki and Nuh al Andalusi, in relation to the plot. Both Wright, also known as Dawud Sharif Abdul Khaliq, and Rovinski were charged with conspiracy to provide material support to ISIL

On September 20, 2016, Rovinski's lawyer William W. Fick announced that his client would change his plea to "guilty" as he had "renounced violence and disavowed any sympathy for" the Islamic State, describing him as "a vulnerable young man who fell deep into a rabbit hole of extremist ideology." Fick was quoted as saying, "Nicholas is prepared to accept personal responsibility for the conspiracy crimes charged and to face the grave penalties that will follow," and "Nicholas hopes he will have opportunities in the future to help others reject twisted ideas and avoid making the same mistakes he did."

== Sentencing ==
On 19 December 2017, David Wright was sentenced to 28 years imprisonment by US District Court Judge William G. Young. Pamela Geller and acting U.S. Attorney William Weinreb had urged that Wright be sentenced to life imprisonment while the defense had called for Wright to be sentenced to 16 years, followed by a lifetime of supervised release. In October 2017, Wright had been found guilty of five charges including conspiracy to provide material support to a designated foreign terrorist organization and obstruction of justice. During the sentencing, Wright apologized to Geller and law enforcement and stated that he had renounced ISIS.
