= Zulfi Hoxha =

American Islamic State senior commander

- Born: January 16, 1992 (age 34); Margate City, New Jersey, United States
- Disappeared: May 9, 2017 (aged 25); Mosul, Nineveh, Iraq
- Died: 2 November 2019
- Other names: "Abu Hamza al-Amriki" "Al Ameriki"
- Citizenship: American
- Education: Atlantic City High School
- Known for: Beheading captives and being an American citizen in a commanding position of the Islamic State
- Parents: Ramadan Hoxha (father); Ltefaji Hoxha (mother)
- Military career
- Allegiance: Islamic State
- Service years: 2015–2019
- Conflicts: Syria: Syrian civil war; Iraq: War in Iraq (2013–2017); Battle of Mosul (2016–2017)

Zulfi Hoxha (US: /ˈhɔːdʒɑː/ HAW-jah; Albanian: [ˈhɔdʒa]; Arabic: ذو الفي خوجة; January 16, 1992 - November, 2 2019), also known by the nom de guerre (kunya) Abu Hamza al-Amriki (Arabic: أبو حمزة الأمريكي), or Al Ameriki (Arabic: الأميركي), was (Note: It is unclear if Hoxha is still alive, and if so, what his rank is in ISIL, post-2018.) an Albanian-American Islamic State (IS) senior commander and recruiter of foreign fighters fighting in Syria and in Iraq.

== Background and education ==
The son of an Albanian-American pizzeria owner, Ramadan Hoxha, in Margate City, New Jersey. Hoxha's parents immigrated to the United States from Albania. He is a 2010 graduate of Atlantic City High School. He was described as shy and closed. Hoxha was described by former co-workers as having used to joke "I hate you, Americans".

== Islamist career ==
Hoxha left the United States on April 6, 2015 for Turkey and four days later joined an IS training camp in Syria. Usaama Rahim and David Wright, co-conspirators in the 2015 Boston beheading plot who were "part of a wider network that was in communication with Islamic State operatives in Syria," raised the funds and made the arrangements that enabled Hoxha to travel to Turkey, make contact with, and join IS in Syria.

Within six months he was featured in a film where several captured Kurdish soldiers are beheaded; Hoxha is the first to behead one of the captives. It might be the first known case of an American IS member beheading individuals on film, and it is the first case in which the US government confirmed the name and American citizenship of an IS member featured in IS media. He is present in the propaganda film from Mosul named We Will Surely Guide Them To Our Ways published May 9, 2017, along with other IS foreign fighters, such as the British suicide bomber and former Guantanamo Bay detainee, Jamal Al Harith. In the film, he at first states in English:

Indeed, America today is the one carrying the banner of the cross and waging war against the Muslims. It did not delay in support in its puppets via air, land and sea, Iraq, Sham [Greater Syria], Libya, Afghanistan and elsewhere. And it openly declares that its goal is only to wipe out the Islamic State, may they fail and lose! It supports Rafida [Shi'ite Muslim] Iran and strives to spread the religion of the Rafida in Muslim territories. Their savage airstrikes have killed and wounded thousands of children, women and elderly, and have destroyed cities of Ahl as-Sunnah [Sunni Muslims]. Therefore, oh Muwwahid [Monotheists] in America, does it not pain you to see your brothers with their honor, have been violated and their bodies have been torn into pieces? By the American airstrikes and their destructive weapons! Are you incapable of stabbing a Kafir [non-Muslim] with a knife, throwing him off of a building, or running him over with a car? Liberate yourself from hellfire by killing a Kafir, for Allah's messenger [Muhammad], Allah's blessings and peace be upon him, said "a Kafir and his killer will not be joined together in hellfire..." So show resolve and place your trust in Allah, and he will pave the way for you, by Allah's permission.

He justifies this incitement to carry out attacks with examples of killings against civilians committed by the American-backed coalition and Iraqi forces. As Al Ameriki, he appeared in the same film showcasing IS-made rocket launchers, after Iraqi soldiers and journalists had mistaken them for American weaponry. He then made another statement in English, saying:

What we have here, the Rafida say that these projectile launchers are weapons which America provided to the Islamic State! This demonstrates the stupidity and foolishness of the Rafida! This weapon is a product of the Islamic State, to Allah belongst all praise. And this weapon, here, is Ghanima [Spoils of war], which was taken from the Rafida's personnel, to whom America gives support and weapons. Allah, the mighty and sublime, has faculated for the soldiers of the Islamic State to produce weapons, with which they can fight the enemies of Allah. Including this anti-tank rocket launcher. It was made and completed from scratch, and to Allah belongst all praise. And this is due to the need for weapons in battle, that can destroy the armor of the Rafida and the Americans. Also, there are several different types, including thermobaric projectile launchers, which can destroy the buildings in which the enemy entrenches himself. As well as other types, whose effects we will leave for the enemies of Allah to discover for themselves.

Hoxha is one of a "few dozen" Americans to have gone overseas to join Islamist terrorists; others include John Georgelas and Abdullah Ramo Pazara. In 2018, Ltefaji Hoxha, his mother, told NBC10 that she spoke with him in 2017 and he was good, but that he didn't call or talk to her anymore. As of 2026, his fate and whereabouts are unknown, either he disappeared from justice, or was killed in Mosul.

== See also ==
- Lavdrim Muhaxheri
- Ridvan Haqifi
- Jamal Udeen Al-Harith

== Sources ==
- Connor, Tracy (May 18, 2017). "ISIS Video Shows New Weapons, 'American' Urging Attacks in U.S". NBC News.
- Everett, Rebecca (November 20, 2018). "Before joining ISIS in Syria, Jersey Shore man was a shy, 'closed person'". NJ.com.
- Greenberg, Ted; McCrone, Brian X. (January 17, 2018a). "The ISIS 'Senior Commander' Who Grew Up on the Jersey Shore". NBC 10 WCAU.
- Greenberg, Ted; McCrone, Brian X. (January 18, 2018b). "'I Hate You, Americans': Co-Worker, Friend Recall ISIS 'Senior Commander' From Jersey Shore". NBC 10 WCAU. ""We used to joke around like, 'We know you can't stand us Americans.' And he would laugh like, haha, 'Yeah, we can't stand you Americans,'" Cacia told NBC10."
- Hughes, Seamus; Meleagrou-Hitchens, Alexander; Clifford, Bennett (January 13, 2018). "A New American Leader Rises in ISIS". The Atlantic.
- "IS flaunts its "Made in Islamic State" weapons". BBC. May 18, 2007. ProQuest 1899728198.
- "Italian paper warns IS may be plotting new attacks in Europe". La Stampa. May 30, 2017. ProQuest 1903345723.
- LeMeire, Jason (May 19, 2017). "ISIS Inspired By Times Square Crash, Warns of Vehicle Attacks on NYC Tourist Hub". Newsweek.
- McCoy, Craig (January 19, 2018). "From Atlantic City High to ISIS: the path of a homegrown terrorist". The Philadelphia Inquirer.
- "Shqiptari komandant". JOQ. Archived from the original on January 15, 2018.
