= Rustam Akhmyarov =

Russian former Guantanamo Bay detainee

- Born: 1973 (age 52–53)
- Released: 2004; Russia
- Citizenship: Russia
- Detained at: Guantanamo
- ISN: 573
- Charge: extrajudicial detention

Rustam Akhmyarov is a Russian who was held in extrajudicial detention in the United States Guantanamo Bay detainment camps. His Guantanamo Internment Serial Number was 573. The Department of Defense reports that Akhmyarov was born on October 24, 1979, in Chelyabinsk, Russia.

He was repatriated to Russia in early 2004, prior to the institution of the Combatant Status Review Tribunals, in July 2004. He was subsequently released from Russian custody.

On August 27, 2005, Akhmyarov and another former Guantanamo detainee Airat Vakhitov, were reported to have been seized by Russian security officials in Moscow and jailed in Tatarstan. According to Geydar Dzhemal, chairman of the Islamic Committee of Russia, the security officials were concerned that when Akhmyarov and Airat Vakhitov visited the United Kingdom, as guests of Amnesty International, they would testify about human rights abuses in Russia, not just in Guantanamo. He predicted the pair would be arrested on trumped up charges.

The pair were released from detention on September 2, 2005.

In 2007, Akhmyarov and three other former captives were reported to have gone into hiding because other former Guantanamo captives had been tortured while in Russian custody.

== See also ==
- Muhammad Saad Iqbal
