= Richard Belmar =

British man

- Born: Richard Dean Belmar; 31 October 1979 (age 47); Westminster, London, England
- Arrested: 7 February 2002; Karachi, Pakistan; Pakistani Inter-Services Intelligence
- Released: 25 January 2005; RAF Northolt
- Citizenship: British
- Detained at: Guantanamo
- ISN: 817
- Status: Repatriated
- Occupation: Former postal worker

Richard Dean Belmar (born 31 October 1979) is a British man who was held in extrajudicial detention in the Guantanamo Bay detention camp. He was first detained in Pakistan in 2002 after his capture in an al Qaeda safehouse and sent to Bagram Theater Internment Facility, then Guantanamo. He was not charged, and was returned to the United Kingdom on 25 January 2005.

== Personal life ==
Belmar was born in Westminster and brought up in Marylebone, London. He has a sister and an older brother. His father is Catholic, and he attended St George's Roman Catholic Secondary School. He trained as a mechanic and worked for the Post Office. He converted to Islam in 1999, after his elder brother.

He spent some time in Pakistan, and says he travelled to Afghanistan to study at a religious school in July 2001.

== Detention ==
In a letter he wrote to his family 10 days after the September 11 attacks, Belmar described living under a regime of "bad food" and intense physical training. Belmar says he was in Kandahar, and tried to leave Afghanistan five times, once disguising himself in a burqa. He says he walked across the mountains, reaching Pakistan in December 2001. He returned to Karachi, and says he did not contact the British Consulate as he thought that anyone who had been in Afghanistan was at risk of arrest.

US officials said Belmar was captured at an al Qaeda safe house in Pakistan in February 2002. His family was told in October 2002 that he had been taken into custody due to an expired visa, and in December 2002 they were told he had been transferred to Guantánamo Bay.

In Pakistan, an FBI/CIA team investigating the murder of Daniel Pearl interrogated Belmar. A senior US official told The Observer that he recommended Belmar be released back to the UK, but MI5 officers who interviewed Belmar in Karachi declined a US suggestion that they try to recruit him, so he was sent instead to Bagram. En route to Bagram, Belmar says he was struck on the back of the head, leaving a dent. He was held and interrogated at Bagram for more than six months, then sent to Guantanamo. British diplomats in Pakistan, acting for his family attempted to establish his whereabouts while he was in Bagram, were denied access to him and were not informed of his transfer to Guantanamo until 5 months after it occurred.

== Release ==
Like nine other UK citizens held at Guantanamo Bay, he was repatriated to the UK. He was flown into RAF Northolt on 25 January 2005, along with Moazzam Begg, Martin Mubanga and Feroz Abbasi, where he was arrested under the Terrorism Act 2000 and briefly questioned at Paddington Green police station, before being released. The police decided that confessions given to MI5 officers were not admissible evidence.

In an interview after his release, he retracted what he said during interrogation, including having heard Bin Laden speak. He claims to have been beaten and sexually humiliated during interrogations, and to have been hung in the strappado position. His father has said: "They have said he was in Afghanistan in 1998 studying chemicals at the terrorists' base but I know he was in London."
