= The Road to Guantánamo =

2006 British docudrama film by Michael Winterbottom and Mat Whitecross

- Original poster for US release, rejected by the MPA
- Directed by: Michael Winterbottom; Mat Whitecross
- Written by: Michael Winterbottom
- Produced by: Melissa Parmenter
- Starring: Riz Ahmed; Farhad Harun; Arfan Usman
- Cinematography: Marcel Zyskind
- Edited by: Mat Whitecross; Michael Winterbottom
- Music by: Molly Nyman; Harry Escott
- Distributed by: Revolution Films; Channel 4
- Release date: 14 February 2006 (Berlin)
- Running time: 95 minutes
- Country: United Kingdom
- Language: English

The Road to Guantánamo, alternatively The Road to Guantanamo, is a 2006 British docudrama film written and directed by Michael Winterbottom and Mat Whitecross about the incarceration of three British citizens (the 'Tipton Three'), who were captured in 2001 in Afghanistan and detained by the United States there and for more than two years at the detainment camp in Guantanamo Bay Naval Base, Cuba. It premiered at the Berlinale on 14 February 2006, and was first shown in the UK on Channel 4 on 9 March 2006. The following day it was the first film to be released simultaneously in cinemas, on DVD, and on the Internet.

The film was generally well received: Michael Winterbottom and Mat Whitecross won the Silver Bear for Best Director at the 56th Berlin International Film Festival, and the film won the Independent Spirit Award for Best Documentary Feature at the Sundance Film Festival. The Times criticised Winterbottom for accepting the men's stated reasons for going to Afghanistan at a time of danger after the 9/11 attacks in the United States, as it was known as al-Qaeda and Taliban territory.

== Synopsis ==
The film portrays the accounts of Ruhal Ahmed, Asif Iqbal and Shafiq Rasul (the 'Tipton Three'); three young British men from Tipton in the West Midlands, who are of Pakistani and Bangladeshi ancestry. It features both actors and portrayals of actions, historical footage, and interviews with the three men.

They travelled to Pakistan in September 2001, just days after the September 11 terrorist attacks in the U.S., to attend a wedding of a friend of theirs. While staying at a mosque in Karachi, the three decided to take a trip to Afghanistan to see first-hand what was happening in the region.

Mixed with interviews with the three men, and archive news footage from the period, the film portrays a dramatic account with actors of the three men's experiences: from their travels into Afghanistan to their capture and imprisonment.

Travelling by van, Ruhal, Asif, and Shafiq, with two other friends, crossed the border in October 2001 just as US warplanes began attacking Taliban positions all over the country. They made it to Kandahar without incident, and to the capital city of Kabul a few days later. After nearly a month of "lingering" aimlessly around Kabul, the Tipton Three decided to return to Pakistan. But through a combination of bad luck and the increasing chaos, the friends took the wrong bus, which travelled further into Afghanistan towards the north and the front-line fighting between the Taliban and the Northern Alliance rebels. The convoy of vehicles they were riding in was hit by an airstrike, and they were left wandering around the unfamiliar country. In mid-November, near the town of Baghlan, the three came across a group of Taliban fighters and asked to be taken to Pakistan. Shortly afterward, all of the men were captured by Northern Alliance soldiers.

Imprisoned at a base at Mazar-e Sharif, the three were interrogated and discovered to be British citizens. As they had no luggage, money, passports or any kind of identification to support their stories, Ruhal, Asif, and Shafiq were transferred to the United States military. They were imprisoned in a US army stockade for a month with other prisoners, being regularly interrogated and occasionally beaten by US soldiers.

In January 2002, the 'Tipton Three' were declared "enemy combatants" by the US military, and flown with dozens of other alleged Taliban and al-Qaeda fighters to Guantanamo Bay, Cuba, where they were held for the next two years. They were held in mostly solitary confinement without charge or legal representation.

The film portrays several scenes depicting beatings during interrogation, the use of torture techniques such as stress positions, and attempts by the US Army to extract forced confessions of involvement with al-Qaeda and the Taliban. The isolation continued in Camp X-Ray and another camp. During two years they were subjected to more questioning by US Army and Central Intelligence Agency interrogators.

In one incident, one US army guard at Camp X-Ray desecrated one prisoner's Qur'an by throwing it to the ground to incite a reaction from the rest of the prisoners. Ruhal witnessed a group of US soldiers severely beat up an unruly and mentally ill Arab prisoner for not obeying their orders. When Ruhal shouts out that the beatings violate the Geneva Conventions, the guards laugh and say those laws do not apply to enemy combatants.

In 2004, the Tipton Three were released without charge. They were flown back to England where, one year later, they returned to Pakistan for the wedding they had planned to attend in the first place (It had been postponed).

== Cast ==
- Riz Ahmed – Shafiq
- Farhad Harun – Ruhel
- Afran Usman – Asif Iqbal
- Mark Holden – Kandahar Interrogator #2

== Production ==
The torture depicted in the film had to be reduced from that claimed by the detainees for the benefit of the actors; according to the actor Riz Ahmed, they were unable to bear the pain and had the shackles on their legs cushioned. They were also unable to remain in the stress positions depicted for more than an hour. The Tipton Three claim to have been left in such positions for up to eight hours.

Filming took place in Afghanistan, Pakistan, and Iran, which doubled as Cuba. Mat Whitecross is credited as co-director. He handled most of the interviews with the Tipton Three, the three British citizens who are featured as characters in the film.

== Release ==
The original poster made to promote the film in the United States (shown right) was refused by the Motion Picture Association of America. They said the burlap sack over the detainee's head was considered to be depicting torture, and inappropriate for young children to see. Howard Cohen of the US-distributors Roadside Attractions condemned this as "inconsistent" when compared to the MPAA-approved posters for contemporary horror films such as Hard Candy or Hostel. The final version of the poster showed just the detainee's manacled hands.

The film premiered at the 56th Berlin International Film Festival on 14 February 2006. It was broadcast to the UK on Channel 4 on 9 March, attracting 1.6 million viewers, and released on DVD and the Internet the following day. Roadside Attractions, an independent distributor, bought the rights to show the film in the United States in late March.

Iranian authorities asked the film's distributor to release the film in Iran, which was unusual for a Western picture. According to the distributor's president, it ordered four prints instead of the usual one and offered three times the normal amount for fees. As of late April 2006, the film was awaiting official approval; it was expected to be released in late May.

=== Detaining of actors ===
Four of the actors in the film were detained for about an hour by police at London Luton Airport after returning from the film's premiere in Berlin. Riz Ahmed stated that during questioning, police asked him whether he had become an actor to further the Muslim struggle, questioned him on his views of the Iraq War, verbally abused him, and denied access to his phone. One of the interrogators tried to recruit him as an informant.

A spokesperson for Bedfordshire Police stated that none of the men were arrested, but the Terrorism Act allows the police to "stop and examine people if something happens that might be suspicious." She did not clarify what the actors had done to arouse suspicion.

== Reception ==
The film received generally positive reviews. On the review aggregator website Rotten Tomatoes, 86% of 98 critics' reviews are positive, with an average rating of 7.1/10. The website's consensus reads: "A gut-wrenching and riveting docu-drama that serves as a stinging indictment of U.S. military justice in an era of ever-increasing scrutiny." Metacritic, which uses a weighted average, assigned the film a score of 64 out of 100, based on 28 critics, indicating "generally favorable" reviews. Michael Winterbottom won the Silver Bear for Best Director at the 56th Berlin International Film Festival.

Some commentators criticised Winterbottom for not questioning the decision of the Tipton Three to enter Afghanistan in the first place; a review in The Times (which gave the film 3 out of 5 stars) refers to this perceived lapse as "an insane lack of cool perspective...The sheer stupidity of these Brits mocks the sincerity of the film. Winterbottom refuses to ask the bleeding obvious. His unquestioning faith in his 'cast' is bewildering."
