= Kandahar Five =

Group of five prisoners of the Taliban detained at Guantanamo Bay detention camp

The Kandahar Five is a term used to refer to five men who had been held, for years, in a Taliban prison in Kandahar, Afghanistan, only to end up in extrajudicial detention in the United States Guantanamo Bay detention camps, in Cuba.

Several of the men were interviewed by international reporters during a brief period of partial freedom when they were held in a refugee camp following the liberation of the prison by Northern Alliance forces, who freed 1500 men. They men say they ended up being traded or sold to the Americans in return for a bounty.

According to the Associated Press, in June 2007 Commander Jeffrey Gordon, a Department of Defense spokesman defended some of the men's continued detention:

Multiple reviews and designations have been conducted since each unlawful enemy combatant was captured, to include during initial detention overseas to lengthy procedures at Guantanamo,

Abd Al Rahim Abdul Rassak Janko (Syrian Kurd)	Imprisoned by the Taliban on suspicion of spying. He is being defended by Steve Sady of Portland, Oregon, who says, he "provided valuable testimony to U.S. investigators on Taliban abuses and should have received protection." Suffering from PTSD, he is being treated with medication.
Jamal Udeen Al-Harith (UK)	Claims he paid a driver to take him from Pakistan to Iran, without realizing that his driver would take a shortcut that would take him through Afghanistan, where the Taliban seized him as an American spy, based on his British passport.; Went directly from custody in a Taliban jail to US custody. Repatriated in March 2004 and immediately released.
Sadik Ahmad Turkistani	Turkistani was imprisoned by the Taliban for four and a half years, because he was alleged to have been involved in a plot to kill al Qaeda leader Osama bin Laden. Turkistani admits being opposed to the Taliban, Al Qaeda and Osama bin Laden, but he denies that he was involved in any plots.
Airat Vakhitov (Russia)	Fled Russia for Tajikistan, in 1999, to avoid harassment by the Russian authorities; was forced by members of the Islamic Movement of Uzbekistan, to travel to Afghanistan; when he was thrown into prison because the Taliban suspected he was a Russian spy. Repatriated in February 2004, he lives in Tatarstan, Russia and works as a freelance writer under a pseudonym. He has been intermittently detained and harassed by authorities.
Abdul Hakim Bukhary	According to the BBC, Bukhary had been jailed by the Taliban for expressing approval of Ahmad Shah Massoud, a Northern Alliance leader assassinated on September 9, 2001.
