= Tipton Three =

British citizen group held in extrajudicial detention

The Tipton Three is the collective name given to three British citizens from Tipton, England who were held in extrajudicial detention by the United States government for two years in Guantanamo Bay detainment camp in Cuba.

Ruhal Ahmed was born on 11 March 1981; Asif Iqbal was born on 24 April 1981; the United States Department of Defense estimated that Shafiq Rasul was born in 1977. Other reports state he was only a couple of years older than his friends. The three men in their early 20s were captured in Afghanistan in 2001, transferred to United States Army custody and transported to Guantanamo, where they were detained as enemy combatants. Their families were not told of their whereabouts until the British Foreign Office informed them in January 2002. They were three of nine Britons detained at Guantanamo.

After negotiations between the governments and British assessment of their interrogations, the men were repatriated to the United Kingdom in March 2004. They were released without charge the next day.

With many others, Shafiq Rasul filed a habeas corpus suit in 2004 against the United States government for his detention, in a case that ultimately went to the US Supreme Court. In the landmark, Rasul v. Bush (2004), the court held that Guantanamo detainees have the right to challenge whether their detention is constitutional in the US courts. The three men were represented in the UK by the lawyer Gareth Peirce.

In addition, the Tipton Three and Jamal Udeen Al-Harith filed a suit in 2004 against the US government in Rasul v. Rumsfeld, challenging its use of torture and religious abuses of detainees. This case was dismissed in April 2009 by the US Court of Appeals for the District of Columbia, based on "limited immunity" of government officials; the court ruled that such treatment had not been legally defined at the time as prohibited. In December 2009 the US Supreme Court declined to accept the case for hearing, so the lower court ruling stands.

The three men were featured as the subjects of The Road to Guantánamo (2006), a docu-drama about the events directed by the British filmmaker Michael Winterbottom.

== The three ==
The three travelled together, were captured together, and were released together on 9 March 2004, along with two other detainees.

=== Ruhal Ahmed ===
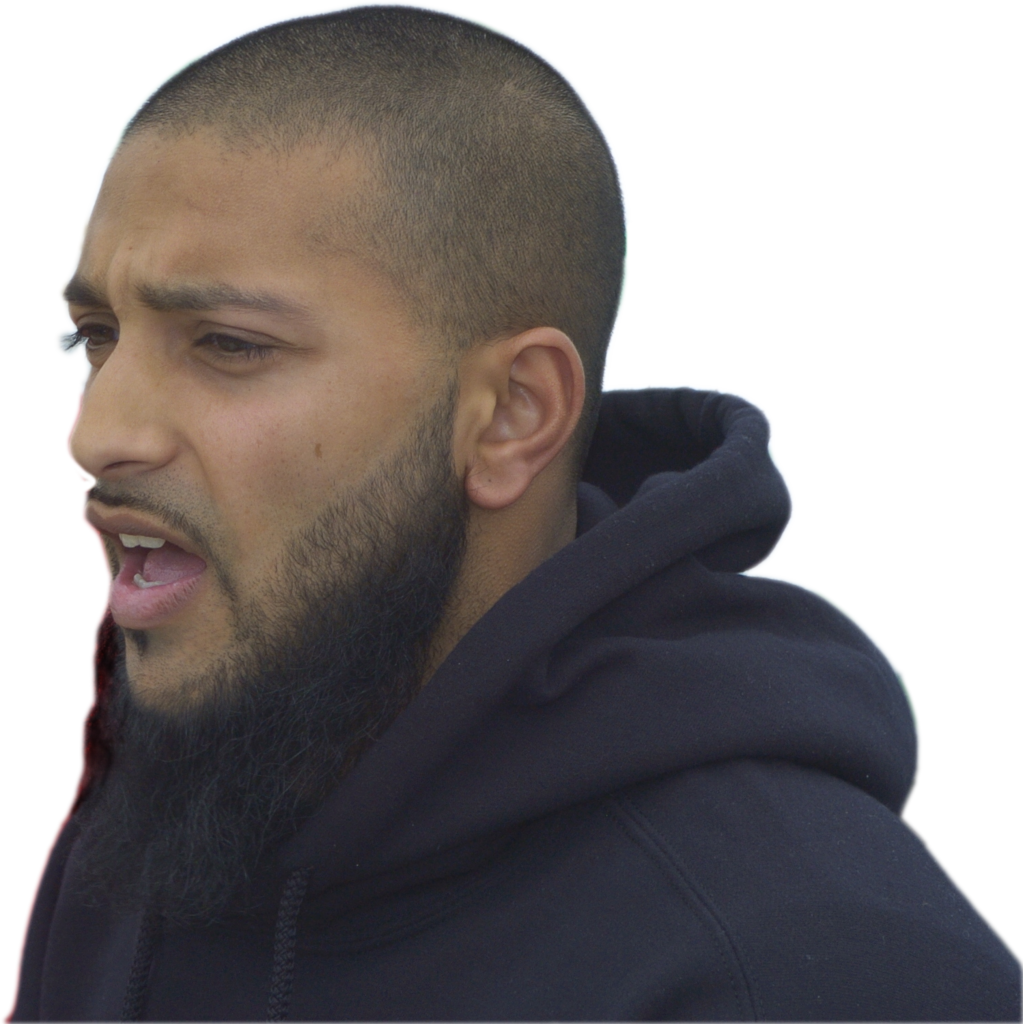
Ruhal Ahmed in 2007

Ruhal Ahmed (born 11 March 1981 in Birmingham, West Midlands, England) is a British citizen. His detainee identification number was 110.

Australia refused Ruhal Ahmed a visa to visit to promote The Road to Guantanamo (2006), a British docudrama made about the events. He has taken part in a campaign against torture, organised by Amnesty International.

=== Shafiq Rasul ===
Shafiq Rasul (born 15 April 1977 in Dudley, West Midlands). His detainee ID number was 86.

His family discovered his detention when the British Foreign Office contacted them on 21 January 2002. He was released in March 2004, shortly after his return to the United Kingdom, more than three months before Rasul v. Bush was decided.

=== Asif Iqbal ===
Asif Iqbal (born 24 April 1981 in West Bromwich, West Midlands) is a British citizen who was held in extrajudicial detention as a terror suspect in the United States' Guantanamo Bay detainment camps in Cuba. Iqbal's Guantanamo detainee ID number was 87.

Iqbal married on 2 July 2005.

== Abuse claims ==
On 4 August 2004 Iqbal, Ahmed and Rasul released a report on their abuse and humiliation while in US custody. In it, according to the BBC, the three describe significant abuse, including:

- They were repeatedly punched, kicked, slapped, forcibly injected with drugs, deprived of sleep, subjected to sensory deprivation, photographed naked, subjected to body cavity searches, and sexual and religious humiliations.
- An American guard told the inmates: "The world does not know you're here. We would kill you and no one would know".
- Iqbal said when he arrived at Guantanamo, one of the soldiers told him: "You killed my family in the towers and now it's time to get back at you".
- Rasul said an MI5 officer had told him during an interrogation that he would be detained in Guantanamo for life.
- The men said they saw the beating of mentally ill inmates.
- Another man was left brain damaged after a beating by soldiers as punishment for attempting suicide.
- The Britons said an inmate told them he was shown a video of hooded men, apparently inmates, being forced to sodomise one another.
- Guards threw prisoners' Qur'ans into toilets and tried to force them to give up their religion.

After the appointment of General Geoffrey Miller as commander of the camp, they said treatment became more harsh, including short shackling and the forced shaving-off of beards.

In the report, they allege that those who represented themselves as being from MI5, or the British Foreign Office, seemed unconcerned with their welfare.

In the end, the three falsely confessed (under force and abusive interrogation) to being the three previously unidentified faces in an alleged video that showed a meeting between Osama bin Laden and Mohamed Atta. However, evidence produced by MI5 showed that they were in England at the time of the meeting.

The three were among the first detainees released who gave an alternative view of conditions within the camp to that offered by United States Department of Defense.

== Representation in other media ==
The Road to Guantanamo (2006) is a docu-drama about the Tipton Three made by director Michael Winterbottom and based on their accounts. The screenplay was based on the initial account from the three detainees.

== Media events ==
=== Lie Lab ===
In May 2007, Ruhal Ahmed and Shafiq Rasul agreed to appear on the Channel 4 reality show Lie Lab. The technology used on the show was developed by Sean Spence from the University of Sheffield. It uses functional magnetic resonance imaging (fMRI) to look at the activity in the brain's pre-frontal cortex to view how a subject reacts to questioning. Critics of the test have included neuroscientists and legal scholars, who have said the technique is unlikely to accurately measure truth-telling, as there are too many variables affecting results. They think the technique may be useful for additional research.

Although he earlier said that he had entered Afghanistan to do charity work, on the programme, Ahmed said he had visited an Islamist training camp, where he handled weapons and learned how to use an AK47. Rasul refused to go through the test.

=== BBC Five Live interview ===
In January 2010, Ruhal Ahmed and Shafiq Rasul were interviewed on Five Live. They both said they had visited a Taliban training camp, but it was because they were trapped in the province. They had wanted to find out "what was happening", and the Taliban was the only government operating at the time. The interviewer Victoria observed that Ahmed had said he had handled AK47 guns.

Shafiq Rasul said:

Being in Afghanistan, we were at that age where… seeing a gun… you'd never seen a gun in the UK… you want to hold it. You want to see what its like. But we were never there to do any training. That's what, that's what, we were just there. We held it to see what it was like. That's how we've explained it. But it has been taken out of context, saying that 'Oh, these guys from the UK, they were at that age, 9/11 had just happened, and they were there for terrorist training'. But, but – that's not the case. That's not what happened
