= Asif Iqbal (Guantanamo detainee) =

British citizen (born 1981)

- Born: 24 April 1981 (age 45); West Bromwich, West Midlands, England
- Arrested: 2001; Pakistan
- Released: 9 March 2004
- Citizenship: United Kingdom
- Detained at: Sheberghan; Guantanamo
- ISN: 87
- Charge: extrajudicial detention
- Status: released

Asif Iqbal (born 24 April 1981) is a British citizen who was held in extrajudicial detention as a terror suspect in the United States Guantanamo Bay detainment camps in Cuba from early 2002 to 9 March 2004.

He is one of the Tipton Three, three friends from the same town who were captured together in Afghanistan. Their story was portrayed in the docu-drama, Road to Guantanamo (2006).

== Background ==
Iqbal was born on 24 April 1981 in West Bromwich and later lived in Tipton, both of which are in the West Midlands of England. He had traveled to Pakistan in the fall of 2001 with friends Ruhal Ahmed and Shafiq Rasul, also from Tipton.

The three were captured in Afghanistan by the Northern Alliance and transferred to United States military custody. After the completion of the Guantanamo Bay detention camp in January 2002, they were transferred there, where they were interrogated and held without recourse to lawyers.

Iqbal's Guantanamo detainee Internment Serial Number was 87. He and his friends were returned to Britain, where the government released them without charges the day after their arrival.

== Report allegations ==
In August 2004, Iqbal, Ahmed and Rasul released a lengthy report on the physical and mental abuses suffered while in US custody, which included sexual and religious humiliation. According to the BBC, the three describe significant abuse, including being repeatedly punched, kicked, slapped, forcibly injected with drugs, deprived of sleep, hooded, photographed naked, and subjected to body cavity searches, and sexual and religious humiliations. An American guard allegedly told the inmates: "The world does not know you're here - we would kill you and no-one would know."

Iqbal said when he arrived at Guantanamo, one of the soldiers told him: "You killed my family in the towers and now it's time to get you back." Rasul said a British MI5 officer had told him during an interrogation that he would be detained in Guantanamo for life. The men said they saw the beating of mentally ill inmates and that another man was left brain damaged after a beating by soldiers as punishment for attempting suicide. The Britons said an inmate told them he was shown a video of hooded men - apparently inmates - being forced to sodomise one another. Guards threw Qur'ans belonging to prisoners into toilets and tried to force them to give up their religion. In the report they allege that those who identified as being from MI5, or the British Foreign Office, seemed unconcerned with their welfare.

They said that the appointment of General Geoffrey Miller coincided with the alleged introduction of new, harsher, treatment, including short shackling and the forced shaving off of beards, which the men kept for religious purposes.

In the end, the abusive interrogation led the three to falsely confess to being the three previously unidentified faces in a video that showed a meeting between Osama bin Laden and Mohamed Atta, although Rasul was in the UK during the time period when the video was created.

== US Court cases ==
While still in detention, the Tipton Three had filed habeas corpus petitions, which were consolidated under Rasul v. Bush (2004). All the detainees had been prevented from seeing or contacting legal counsel and challenging their detention before a tribunal, under habeas corpus. Two other major cases of habeas corpus petitions were consolidated under Rasul v. Bush, including Habib v. Bush and Al-Odah v. United States. In a landmark decision by the United States Supreme Court, made in June 2004 after their release, it determined that detainees were covered by the jurisdiction of US courts and had constitutional rights, including the right to counsel and to habeas corpus. Following that, the United States Department of Defense (DOD) devised the Combatant Status Review Tribunal (CSRT) to evaluate whether detainees qualified as enemy combatants, and military commissions to try charges against them. CSRTs were held beginning in 2004.

After their release, in 2004, Rasul v. Rumsfeld, the plaintiffs and former detainees Shafiq Rasul, Asif Iqbal, Ruhal Ahmed, and Jamal Al-Harith, sued former Secretary of Defense Donald Rumsfeld in the United States District Court for the District of Columbia. They charge that Secretary Rumsfeld and the military chain of command permitted illegal interrogation tactics to be used against them. The plaintiffs each sought compensatory damages for torture and arbitrary detention while being held at Guantánamo.

Some aspects of the case were dismissed at the District Court level. The Appeals Court overturned the lower court ruling on coverage of religious protections. In 2008, the United States Supreme Court granted certiorari, vacated the judgment, and remanded the case to the Court of Appeals, based on the intervening Boumediene v. Bush (2008). In that case, it had ruled that detainees and foreign nationals had the habeas corpus right to bring suit in federal courts.

On 24 April 2009, the Court of Appeals dismissed the Rasul v. Rumsfeld case again, on the grounds of "limited immunity" of government officials. It ruled that the courts at the time of the alleged abuses had not yet clearly established legal prohibitions against the torture and religious abuses suffered by the detainees. On 14 December 2009, the US Supreme Court declined to accept the case for hearing.

== Representation in media ==
The film, The Road to Guantánamo (2006) is a docu-drama by the director Michael Winterbottom based on their accounts of their capture, interrogations and detention. It uses both actors and interviews with the former detainees.

== Formerly secret Joint Task Force Guantanamo assessment ==
On 25 April 2011, whistleblower organization WikiLeaks published formerly secret assessments drafted by Joint Task Force Guantanamo analysts. The three-page Joint Task Force Guantanamo assessment was drafted on 28 October 2003. It was signed by camp commandant Major General Geoffrey D. Miller. He recommended continued detention by the Department of Defense.

Historian Andy Worthington, author of The Guantanamo Files, called Iqbal's assessment "extremely dubious". He pointed out the following inconsistencies.

- One of the trips Iqbal made with other family members to Pakistan that Guantanamo analysts regarded as suspicious took place when he was just a child.
- Analysts claimed that Iqbal and his friends spent four weeks at the al Farouq training camp, al Qaeda's primary "basic training" camp even though al-Qaeda had shut the camp down on 10 September, anticipating its well-known location would make it a target for an aerial counter-attack.
- Iqbal traveled with his friend Shafiq Rasul; however, the DoD narrative of his travels was wildly at odds with what they offered for Rasul.
- DoD's fanciful narrative described Iqbal traveling around Afghanistan when it was well documented he was one of those who survived the infamous "convoy of death" and the shockingly brutal conditions in General Dostum's Sherberghan prison.

== See also ==
- Tipton Three
