= Short shackling =

Method of torture

Short shackling is a torture technique where the person being tortured is bound, usually by the hands with a shackle, with little to no room to move in the radius of the tether. According to a military report, the suspect's hands are shackled to an eyebolt on the floor, so that the suspect is forced to lie in a fetal position or squatting position. It is believed that the suspect's feet are also bound to the eyebolt, similar to hogtying, but this has not been confirmed in any government reports. This interrogation technique can cause flesh wounds.
