= Ruhal Ahmed =

British citizen (born 1981)

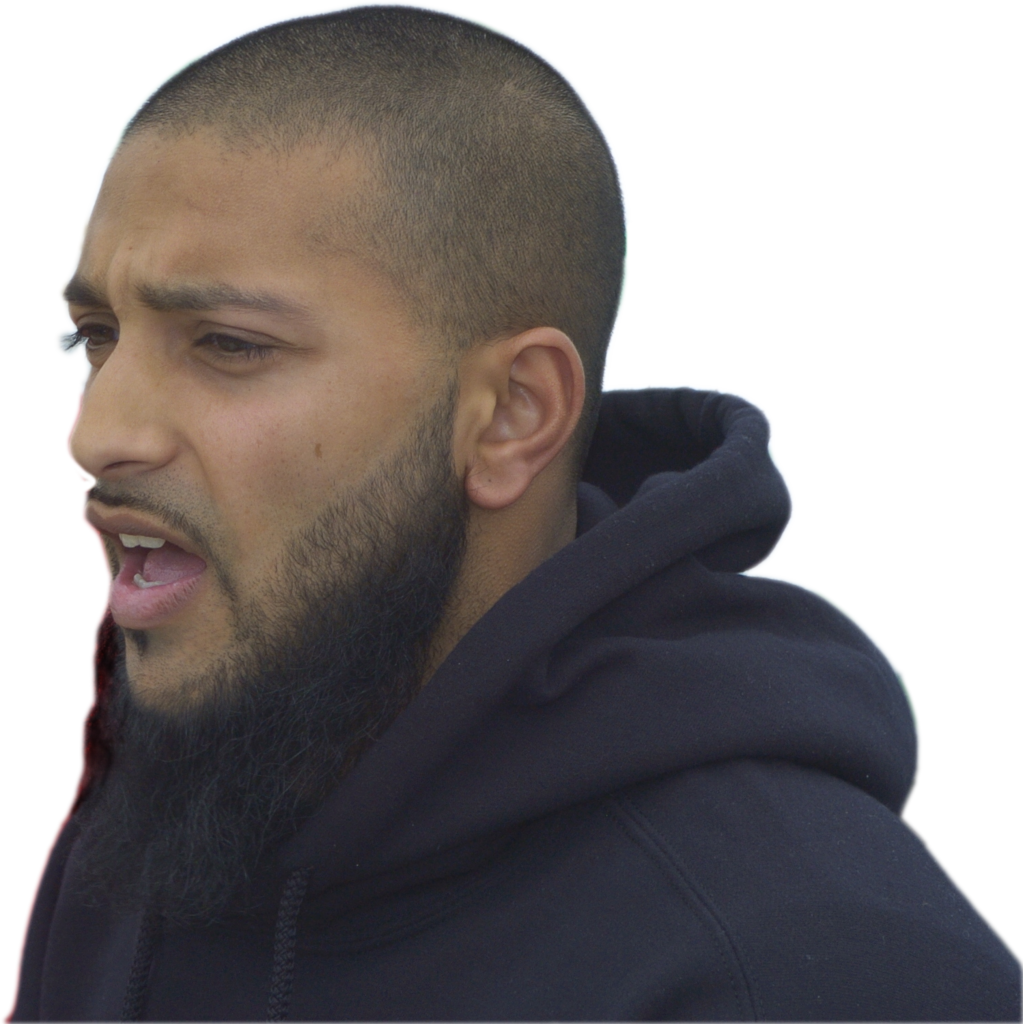
- Ruhal Ahmed in 2007
- Born: Rhuhel Ahmed; 3 November 1981 (age 45); Birmingham, West Midlands, England
- Arrested: October 2001; Afghanistan; Northern Alliance
- Released: March 2004; United Kingdom
- Citizenship: United Kingdom
- Detained at: Guantanamo Bay detention camp
- ISN: 110
- Status: Repatriated
- Spouse: Shaeda Ahmed
- Parents: Riasoth Ahmed (father)

Interview with Ruhal Ahmed by Laura Poitras in 2010

Ruhal Ahmed (also spelled Rhuhel Ahmed, born 3 November 1981) is a British citizen who was detained without trial for over two years by the United States government, beginning in Afghanistan in 2001, and then in the Guantanamo Bay detention camp. His Internment Serial Number was 110. Ahmed was returned to the United Kingdom in March 2004, where he was released the next day without charges.

He was one of three men, friends from Tipton, United Kingdom, who had been detained. They became known as the Tipton Three. In August 2004, Ahmed, Shafiq Rasul and Asif Iqbal compiled and released a report on their abuses while in US custody.

In Rasul v. Rumsfeld, the Tipton Three and Jamal Udeen Al-Harith, four former Guantánamo Bay internees, sued former US Secretary of Defense Donald Rumsfeld. They charge that illegal interrogation tactics were permitted to be used against them by Rumsfeld and the US military chain of command.

The 2006 film, The Road to Guantánamo, is a docu-drama by Michael Winterbottom depicting their account of their detention. Ahmed was refused a visa by Australia to travel there to promote the film.

== Travel and detention ==
With his friends, Shafiq Rasul and Asif Iqbal, in October 2001, weeks after the 9/11 attacks in the United States, Ahmed travelled to his country of origin Pakistan, reportedly for a friend's wedding but while there went into Afghanistan and was caught when war broke out.

They were captured by soldiers of the Northern Alliance and transferred to the custody of the US Army, as they had purportedly lost all their identification and luggage. They were detained there and transported to Guantanamo Bay detention camps on US territory in Cuba, where they were severely interrogated and treated as enemy combatants.

The Associated Press quoted Ahmed following the US announcement of the deaths of three detainees at Guantanamo in June 2006, who were alleged to have committed suicide.

He said, "There is no hope in Guantanamo. The only thing that goes through your mind day after day is how to get justice or how to kill yourself. It is the despair - not the thought of martyrdom - that consumes you there." He went on, "A Saudi detainee in the cell in front of us had had enough. We could hear him rip up his sheets and tie it to the wire mesh roof of the cell. He jumped off his sink and tried to hang himself. We shouted to the military police and they came and saved him." Last, he said, "It's weird because when we left we weren't even that religious, We were young - average British lads. Obviously if we knew what we were getting ourselves into we would have never gone."

== Release ==
Ahmed, Rasul, and Iqbal were returned to the UK in March 2004, and released the next day without charges. In August 2004, they compiled and released a report on their abuses while in US custody. On 15 June 2008, the McClatchy News Service published articles based on interviews with 66 former Guantanamo captives. McClatchy reporters interviewed Ahmed in Britain.

Ahmed said when he returned to Tipton, someone had hung an effigy clad in an orange Guantanamo overall, labelled "Tipton Taliban will die."

Ahmed has taken part in a campaign against torture, organized by Amnesty International.
