= Airat Vakhitov =

Russian Guantanamo detainee (born 1977)

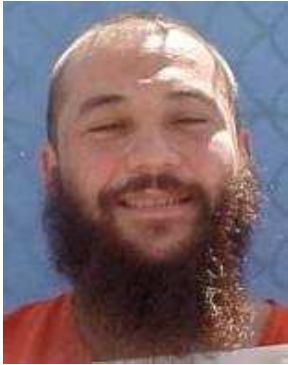
- Airat Vakhitov
- Born: 1977 (age 48–49)
- Citizenship: Russian
- Detained at: Guantanamo
- Charge(s): no charge, extrajudicial detention
- Occupation: imam

Airat Nasimovich Vahitov, also spelled Ayrat Wakhitov or Vahidov (Tatar: Айрат Вахитов, romanized: Ayrat Waxitov), is an ethnic Tatar citizen of Russia who was held in extrajudicial detention in the United States' Guantanamo Bay detention camp, in Cuba. He was repatriated with six other Russians in February 2004. Fluent in Arabic, Pashto, Persian, Urdu and Russian, he also spoke basic English.

Vakhitov spoke publicly on June 28, 2005 about torture in Guantanamo when he announced he was planning to sue the United States for his mistreatment. Geydar Dzhemal, chairman of the Islamic Committee of Russia, reported that he was hosting Vakhitov, and another former Guantanamo detainee, Rustam Akhmyarov, following threats by security officials. According to Dzhemal the security officials had visited Vakhitov, and warned him that he should only talk about torture in Guantanamo Bay, not Russian torture. Dzhemal reported that security officials subsequently seized Vakhitov and Akhmyarov from his apartment on August 29, 2005. He called their seizure a kidnapping because they refused to show their identification. He predicted that the pair would be arrested on trumped up charges, to curtail their human rights activities.

The pair were released from detention on September 2, 2005.

On May 15, 2006, the Department of Defense released its first full official list of all the Guantanamo detainees who were held in military custody. Airat Vakhitov's name is not on that list. The list includes an individual named Aiat Nasimovich Vahitov who was born on March 27, 1977, on Naberezhnye Chelny, Tatarstan, Russia.

Russian authorities released the detainees after investigations into whether they had broken any Russian laws. In 2005 he was once more detained in Russia under suspicion of organising terror acts in Tatarstan but released after two months, and immediately left to Middle East. In 2011 he published a video titled "39 ways of helping the jihad and taking part in it". In June 2016 he was arrested in Turkey for involvement in the Atatürk Airport attack.

== Airat Vakhitov and other former Taliban prisoners ==
Airat Vakhitov was one of nine former Taliban prisoners the Associated Press pointed out had gone from Taliban custody to American custody. The Taliban had accused Vakhitov of spying for Russia, and imprisoned him for nearly three years. In Kandahar Airfield, he complained to Cpt. Danner that he had been housed in a more humane prison by the Taliban, where he had been given a radio, fresh fruit and proper toilet facilities.

== McClatchy interview ==
On June 15, 2008 the McClatchy News Service published articles based on interviews with 66 former Guantanamo captives. McClatchy reporters interviewed Airat Vakhitov by telephone. Airat Vakhitov told his interviewers he was suffering ongoing mental problems, and that he was worried that if interviewers visited him in person he would be punished by Russian security officials.

Airat Vakhitov was an imam in Tatarstan, who was imprisoned following a general round-up when Russian officials were cracking down on Chechens. He was temporarily freed, and fled Russia when he learned that security officials were looking for him. He said he was kidnapped by the forces of the Islamic Movement of Uzbekistan, and eventually transported to Afghanistan, against his will.

=== Formerly secret Joint Task Force Guantanamo assessment ===
On April 25, 2011, whistleblower organization WikiLeaks published formerly secret assessments drafted by Joint Task Force Guantanamo analysts. A five-page Joint Task Force Guantanamo assessment was drafted on June 3, 2005. It was signed by camp commandant Brigadier General Jay W. Hood. He recommended transfer to the control of another country.
