= Shafiq Rasul =

Guantanamo detainee known to have been released

- Born: April 15, 1977 (age 49)
- Arrested: 2001; Afghanistan
- Released: August 2004; United Kingdom
- Citizenship: United Kingdom
- Detained at: Guantanamo Bay detainment camp
- ISN: 86
- Status: Repatriated

Shafiq Rasul's Guantanamo detainee assessment.

Shafiq Rasul (born 15 April 1977) is a British citizen who was a detainee held at Guantanamo Bay by the United States, which treated him an unlawful combatant. His detainee ID number was 86.

His family discovered his detention when the British Foreign Office contacted them on 21 January 2002. He was released in March 2004, shortly after his return to the United Kingdom, more than three months before Rasul v. Bush was decided.

In August 2004, Rasul, Asif Iqbal, and Ruhal Ahmed, all from Tipton - and known as the Tipton Three - compiled a report on their abuse and humiliation while in US custody.

In Rasul v. Myers, the court held that "implementation and supervision of the alleged torture and detention of the detainees was within the scope of their employment" under the Westfall Act.

In Rasul v. Rumsfeld, plaintiffs Rasul, Asif Iqbal, Ruhal Ahmed, and Jamal Al-Harith, four former Guantánamo Bay detainees, sued former Secretary of Defense Donald Rumsfeld. They charge that illegal interrogation tactics were permitted to be used against them by Secretary Rumsfeld and the military chain of command.

The Hague Justice Portal gives access to the official Court documents related to Rasul v. Bush.

In late February 2017, ISIL spokesmen issued a press release, stating that Jamal al-Harith, another former Guantanamo captive, had traveled to Iraq, and had used a suicide bomb to attack a military site there. Rasul denounced the attack, asserted that there was "no excuse" for the attack, and that he had been able to move past his experiences, and didn't understand why al-Harith hadn't.
