= Jamal Udeen Al-Harith =

Guantanamo detainee

- Born: Ronald Fiddler; 20 November 1966; Manchester, England
- Died: 21 February 2017 (aged 50); Mosul, Iraq
- Cause of death: Suicide bombing
- Other name: "Abu-Zakariya al-Britani"
- Citizenship: British
- Known for: His detainment at Guantanamo Bay and being a British citizen who had carried out and died in an act of terror overseas
- Spouse: Shukee Begum
- Children: 5
- Criminal information
- Status: Released
- Criminal charge: None

Details
- Imprisoned at: Taliban prison in Kandahar; Guantanamo Bay
- Military career
- Allegiance: Islamic State
- Service years: 2014–2017
- Conflicts: Syria: Syrian civil war; Iraq: War in Iraq (2013–2017); Battle of Mosul (2016–2017) †

Jamal Udeen Al-Harith, born Ronald Fiddler (20 November 1966 – 21 February 2017) also known as Abu-Zakariya al-Britani, was a British citizen who reportedly died carrying out a suicide bombing in Iraq in February 2017.

Prior to being in Iraq, Jamal had been held in extrajudicial detention as a suspected enemy combatant in the United States Guantanamo Bay detention camps, in Cuba for more than two years. Together with the Tipton Three, he was among five British citizens repatriated in March 2004 and the next day released by British authorities without charge. That year, he was a party to Rasul v. Rumsfeld, which sued the United States government and the military chain of command for its interrogation tactics. The case was finally dismissed in 2009 after being remanded by the United States Supreme Court to the US District Court for the District of Columbia, on grounds of the government officials having had "limited immunity" at the time. In December 2009, the US Supreme Court declined to accept the case for hearing on appeal.

The British government paid a compensation of £1 million to Jamal al-Harith after his release from Guantanamo.

== Early life and conversion ==
He was born Ronald Fiddler in 1966 in Manchester, England, to parents who had migrated from Jamaica. He has a sister, Maxine Fiddler. Fiddler attended local schools. He became a web designer, working in Manchester.

In about 1991, Fiddler converted to Islam and officially changed his name to Jamal Udeen Al-Harith.

== Travels and detention ==
Al-Harith began an Internet relationship with Samantha Cook, who lived in Perth, Australia. He travelled there in early 2000 to meet her in person. She is the daughter of the Australian Senator Peter Cook. After their relationship ended in July 2000, he returned to Manchester and his work.

After some time back in Manchester, in 2002, al-Harith claimed that he travelled to Pakistan only as a backpacking trip. While there, he paid a truck driver to take him to Iran. The truck was stopped when he passed near the Afghan border. Taliban guards, seeing his British passport, arrested him as a British spy, which was consistent with their usual treatment of foreigners.

American troops discovered al-Harith among numerous foreigners held by the Taliban in jail in Kandahar and released him. He was being aided by the Red Cross to make arrangements to return to Britain. They enabled him to call his family in Britain, whom he told he would be soon flying home. The Red Cross had arranged with the British embassy to fly him out from the American airbase to Kabul to meet the British representative.

Al-Harith was detained in Kabul by US forces who found his explanations regarding the purpose of his travels in the region to be implausible. He was arrested as a suspected enemy combatant and transported to Guantanamo Bay detention camp, where he was one of nine British citizens detained. He was interviewed by representatives of MI5 and the British Foreign Office, as well as by US officials, and, according to US interrogators, he provided them with useful information about the Taliban's methods. The United States notified the Australian government of al-Harith's detention because he had recently been in the country. The ASIO carried out an investigation of his activities while in Australia and concluded that he had not constituted a security risk. After being held for two years, during which he claimed to have experienced "cruel, inhumane and degrading treatment", he was released without charge.

== Repatriation and release ==
In March 2004, al-Harith was among five British citizens, including the Tipton Three, who were released and repatriated to the United Kingdom. Tony Blair's government was involved with getting Abu-Zakariya freed from Guantanamo in 2004, and he defended his government's decision in 2017. The day after they were freed from Guantanamo Bay, all were released by British authorities without charge. After being released, al-Harith joined the British plaintiffs Shafiq Rasul, Asif Iqbal, and Ruhal Ahmed (the Tipton Three), all former Guantánamo Bay detainees, in Rasul v. Rumsfeld, to sue Secretary of Defense Donald Rumsfeld in 2004. They charged that illegal interrogation tactics, including torture and religious abuse, were permitted to be used against them by Secretary Rumsfeld and the military chain of command. They were aided by representation by the Center for Constitutional Rights and a private law firm.

The case went through several levels of hearings: the US District Court, the Court of Appeals, and the US Supreme Court. Following the US Supreme Court's decision of Boumediene v. Bush (2008), which ruled that detainees had the right to access federal courts directly, the Supreme Court remanded the case to the US District Court. It dismissed the case in 2009 on the grounds of "limited immunity" for government officials, holding that at the time in question, the courts had not clearly established that torture was prohibited in the treatment of detainees at Guantánamo. (This was established by law in the Detainee Treatment Act of 2005.) In December 2009, the US Supreme Court declined to accept the case for hearing on appeal.

Because of his imprisonment as a "terrorist," al-Harith had difficulty getting work in Britain despite having been paid compensation from the UK government. His sister has said that he struggled to get back to his life.

== Al-Harith and other former Taliban prisoners ==
Al-Harith was one of nine former Taliban prisoners whom the Associated Press identified as having been freed from Taliban custody only to be taken up into United States military custody. He was among the Kandahar Five, detainees who had all been jailed previously in the Kandahar prison. When the Northern Alliance liberated the prison in December 2001, they freed 1,500 men.

== IS and death ==
In 2014, al-Harith travelled to Syria to enlist in the Islamic State. His wife, Shukee Begum, with their five children, joined him for some months in 2015 before fleeing from the IS-controlled territory.

In February 2017, IS announced that al-Harith had been killed when he carried out a suicide car bombing at an Iraqi army base in Tal Gaysum, southwest of Mosul. Reuters cited three anonymous Western security officials, who claimed that it was likely that al-Harith was the suicide bomber. The UK Prime Minister's office, said that there was no confirmation that he had been the suicide bomber, other than the claims of militants.

On 9 May 2017, IS released a propaganda film from Mosul named We Will Surely Guide Them To Our Ways. A part of the film apparently shows al-Harith smiling while inside of a suicide car bomb, before he carried out the suicide bombing. Later on, the film showed aerial footage from a drone of his suicide attack. The film also showed other IS foreign fighters, such as the American citizen, Zulfi Hoxha.

== See also ==
- American prisoners who were previously Taliban prisoners
- Zulfi Hoxha
