= List of Medal of Honor recipients for the Attack on Pearl Harbor =

The Medal of Honor is the highest military decoration presented by the United States government to a member of its armed forces. The attack on Pearl Harbor was a surprise military strike on the neutral United States by the Imperial Japanese Navy against numerous U.S. military sites on the island of Oahu – with a focus on the naval base at Pearl Harbor – in the U.S. Territory of Hawaii on the morning of December 7, 1941. The attack caused 3,581 American casualties (2,403 killed, 1,178 wounded) and devastated the U.S. naval fleet and airfields, forcing America's entry into World War II.

For their actions during the attack on Pearl Harbor, 15 sailors in the U.S. Navy (from seven ships and one Naval Air Station) and 1 Marine were awarded Medals of Honor. The 16 recipients held a wide range of ranks, from seaman to rear admiral. Eleven (69%) received their awards posthumously.

== Specific locations ==
Medals of Honor were awarded to four sailors from USS California, three from USS Arizona, two each from USS Nevada and USS Oklahoma, and one each from USS Utah, USS Vestal, USS West Virginia, as well as one land based at Naval Air Station Kaneohe Bay and a marine based at Naval Air Station Midway,

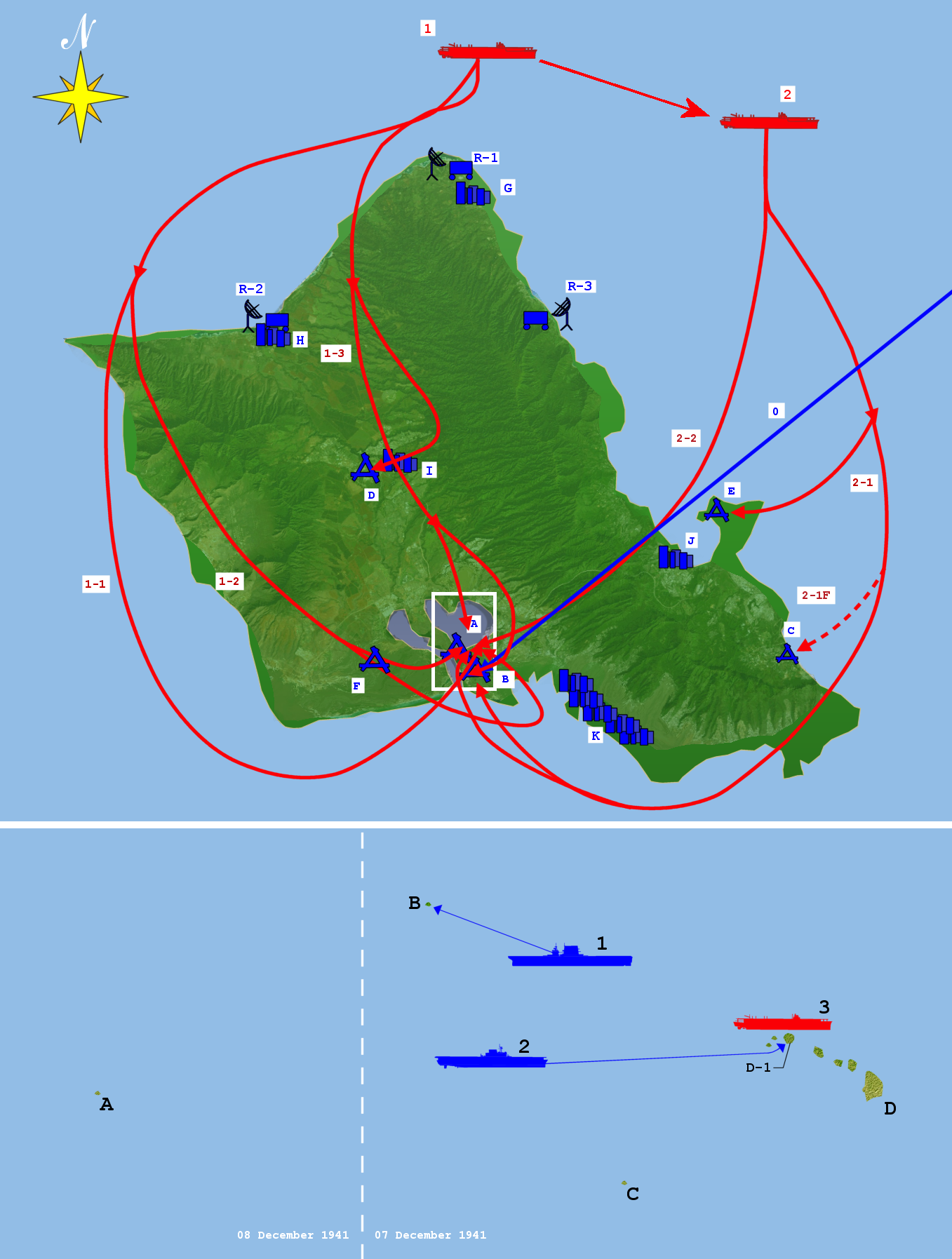
Pearl Harbor and NAS Kaneohe Bay ("A" and "E" on upper map), NAS Midway ("B" on lower map)

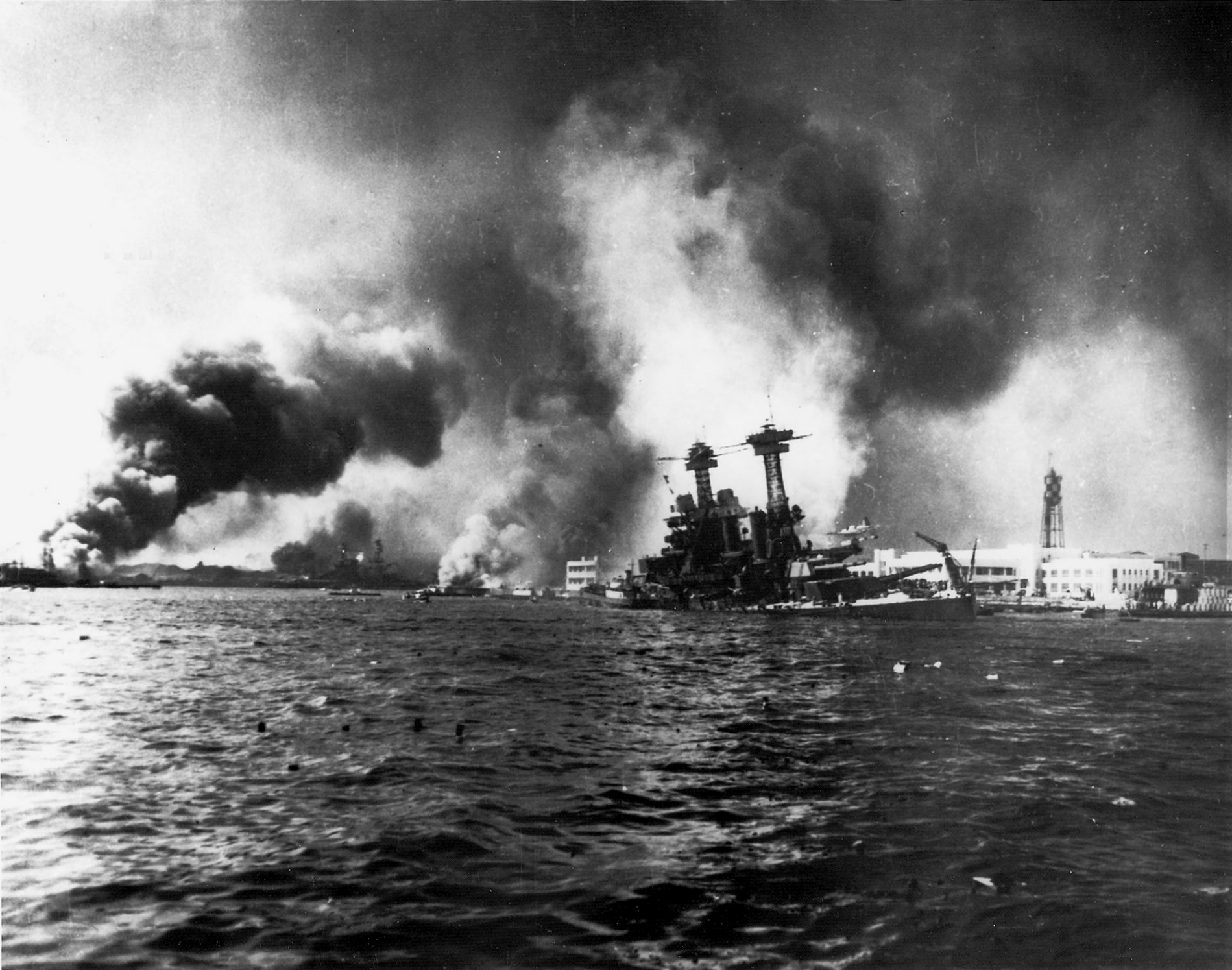
USS California sinks

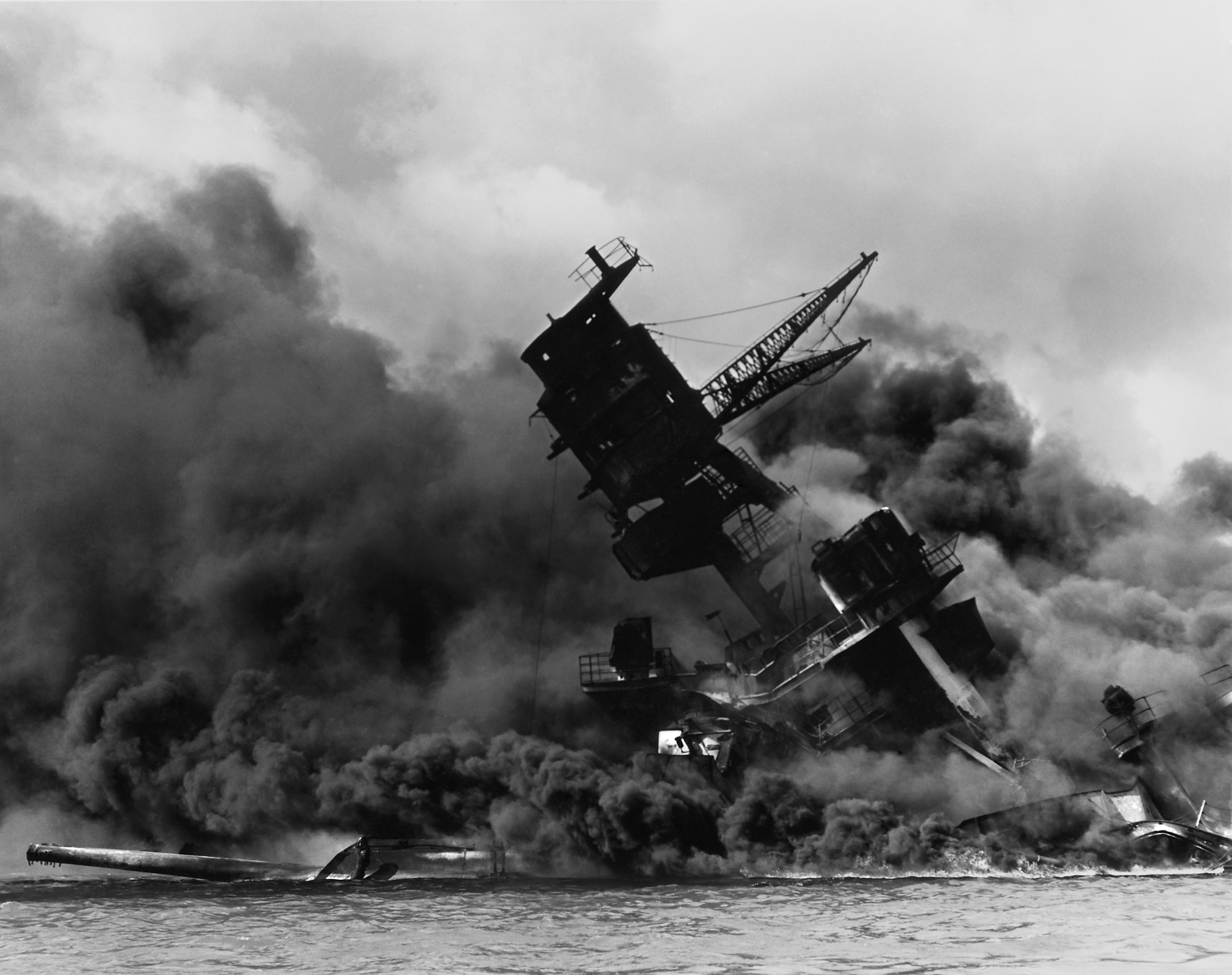
USS Arizona sinks

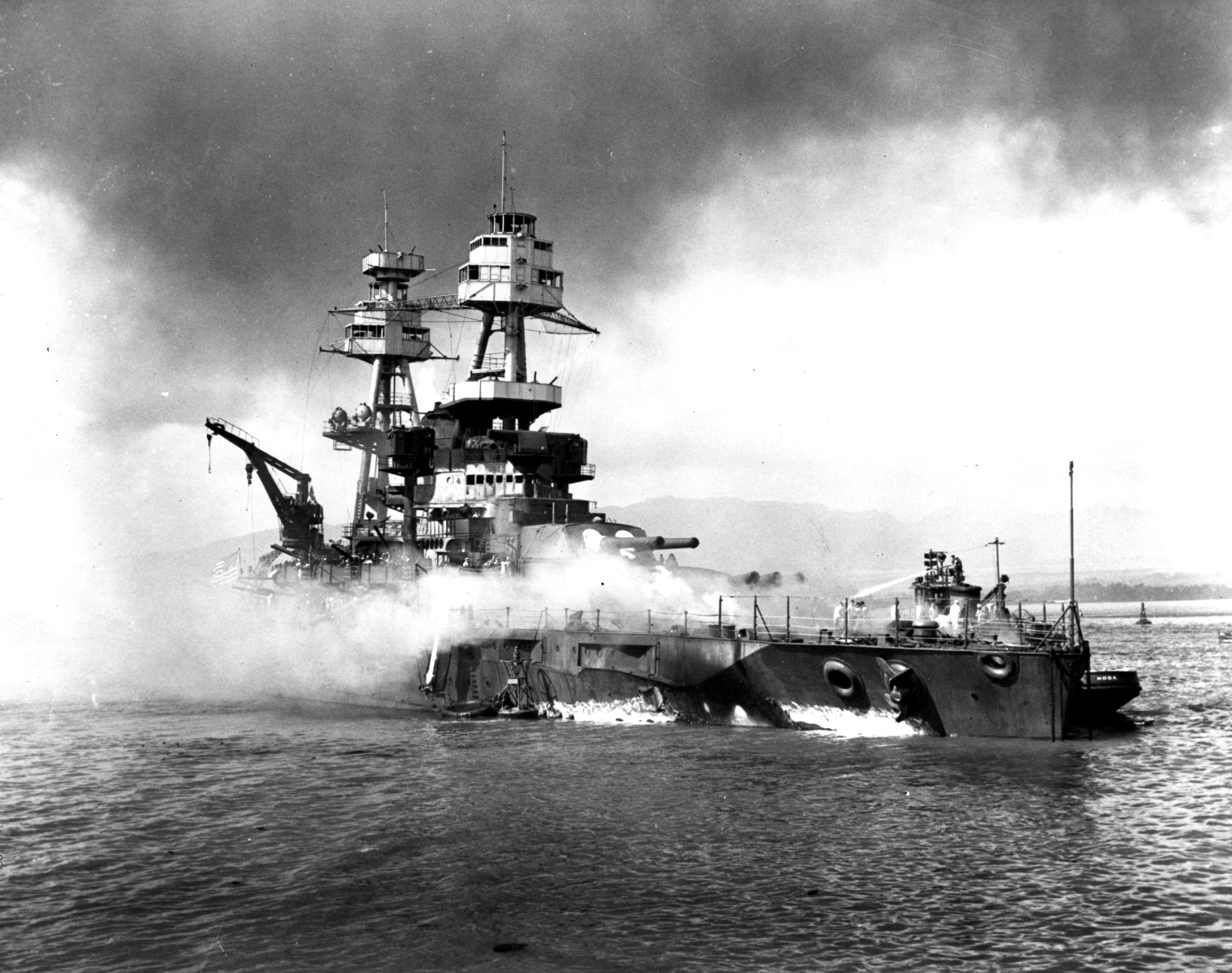
USS Nevada beached

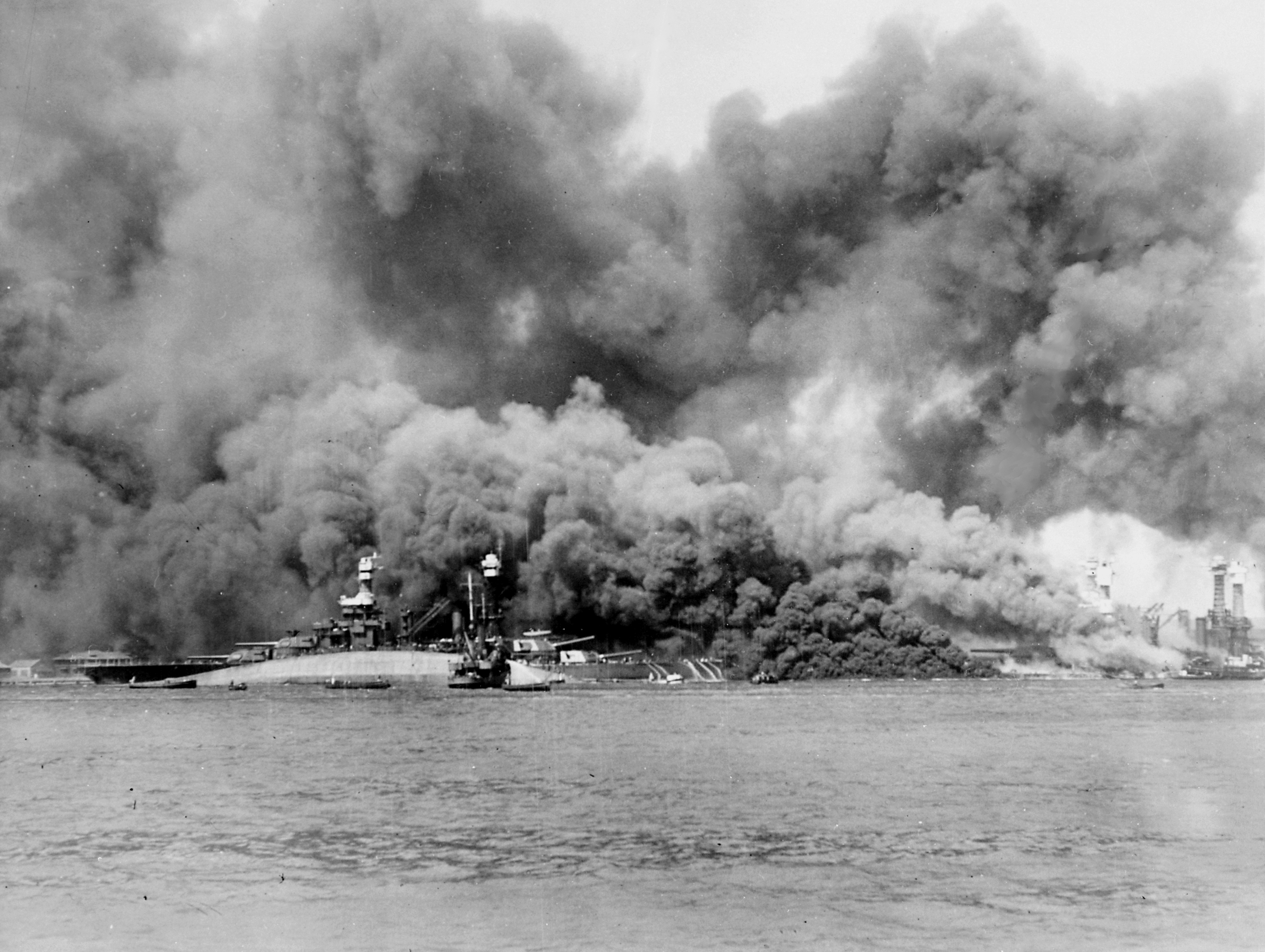
USS Oklahoma capsized

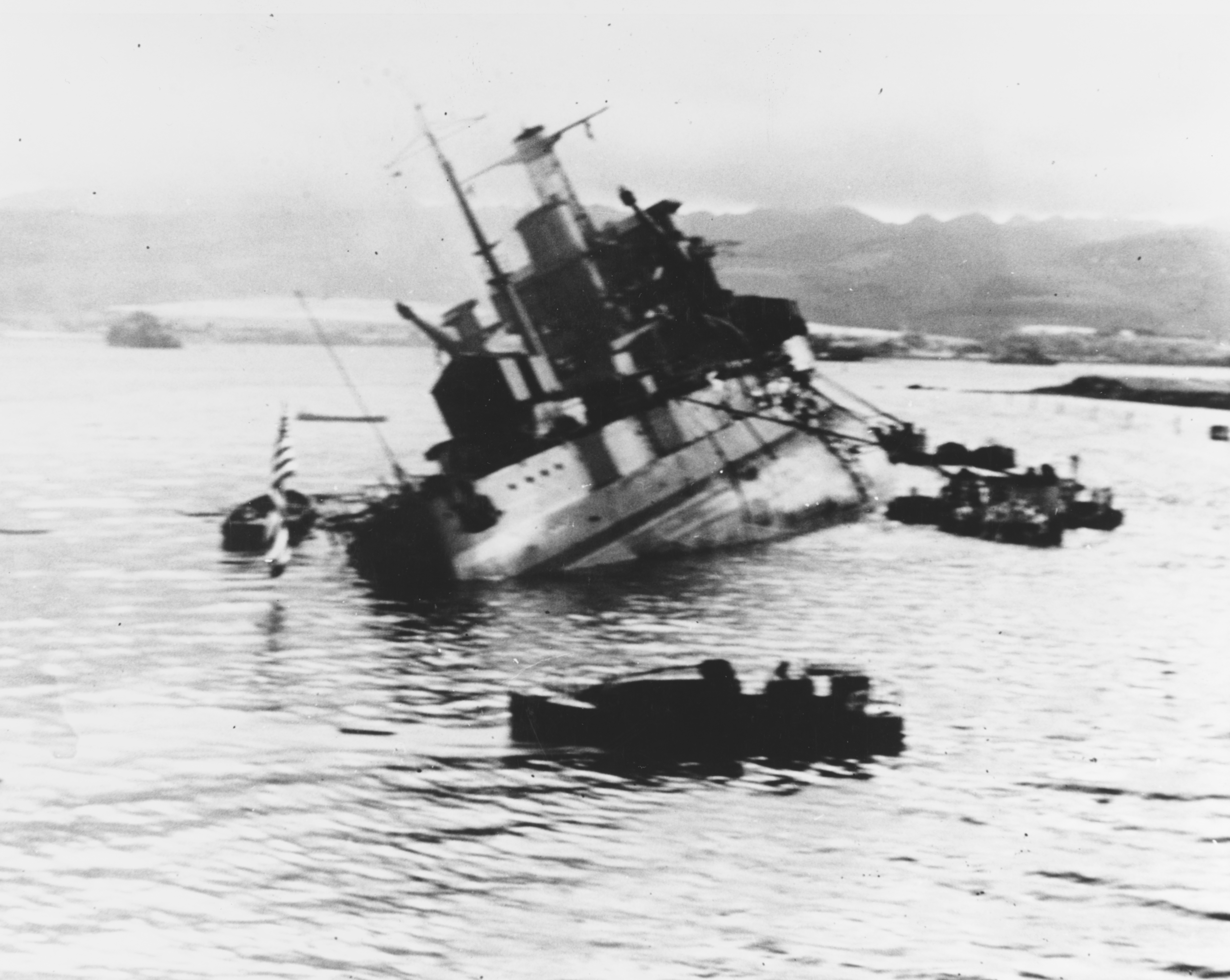
USS Utah capsizing

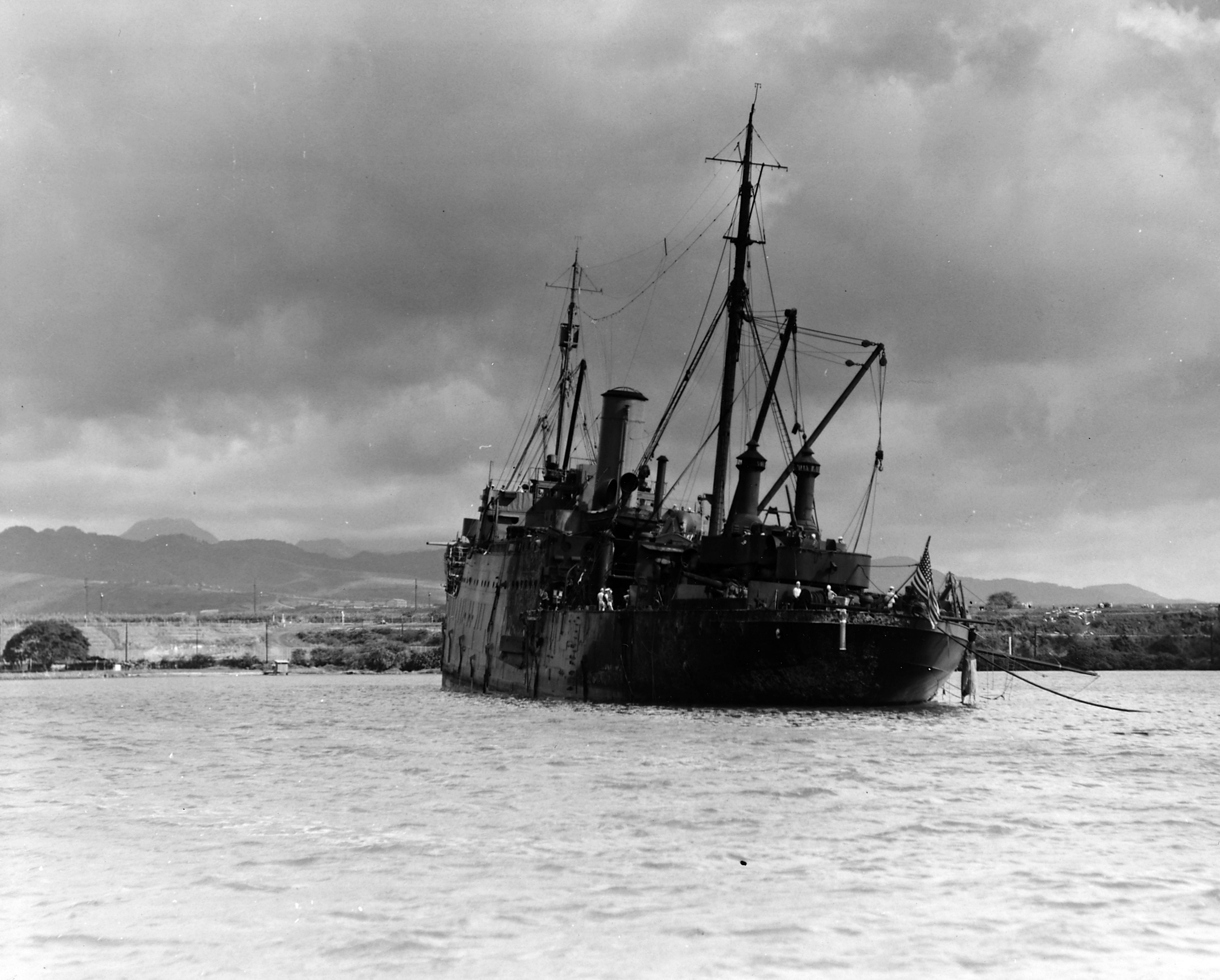
USS Vestal beached

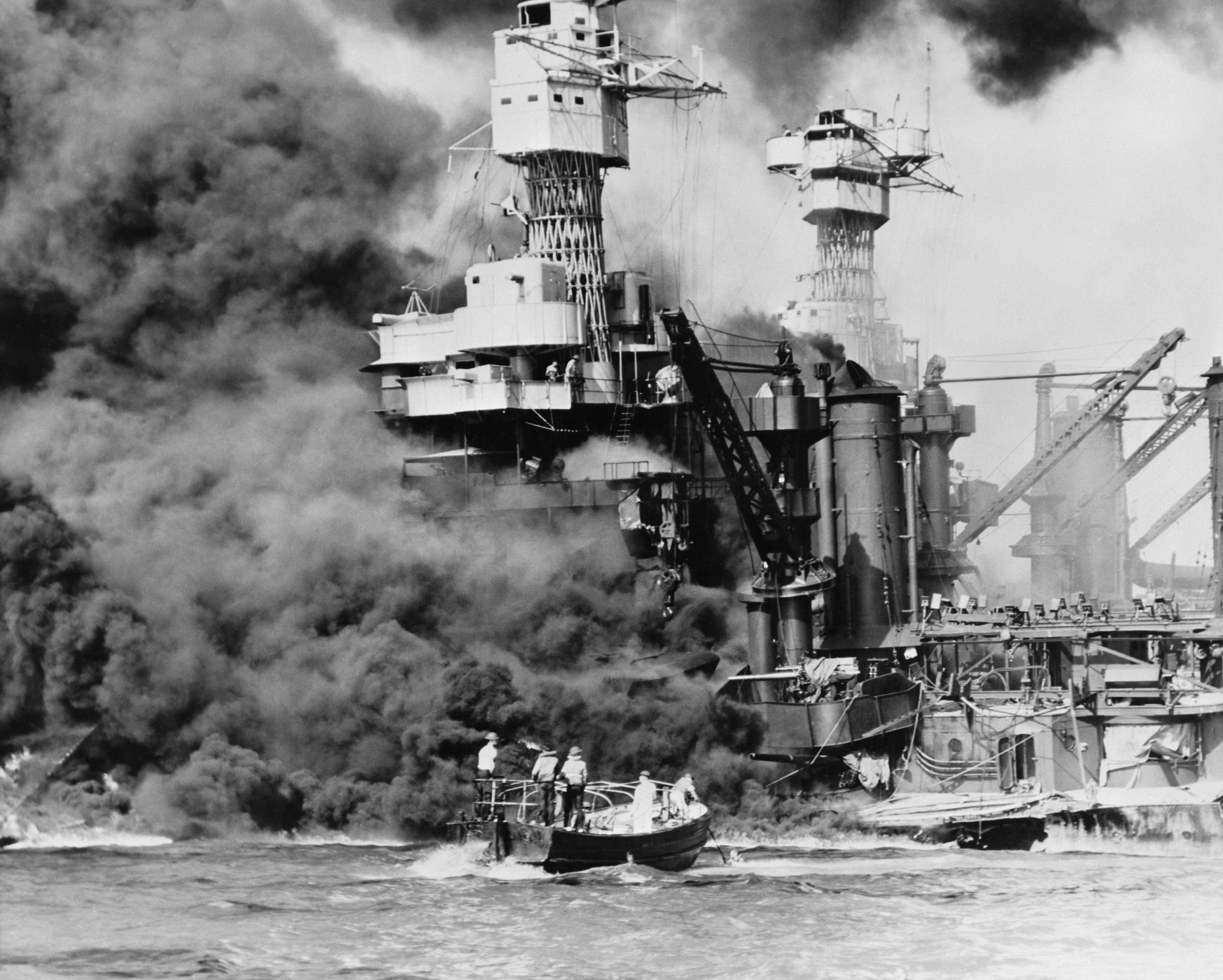
USS West Virginia burning

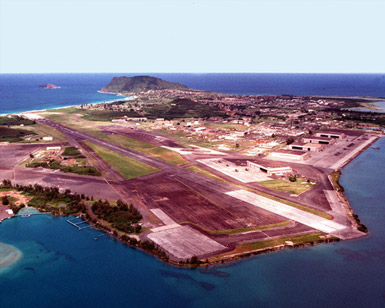
NAS (now MCAS) Kaneohe Bay in 2007

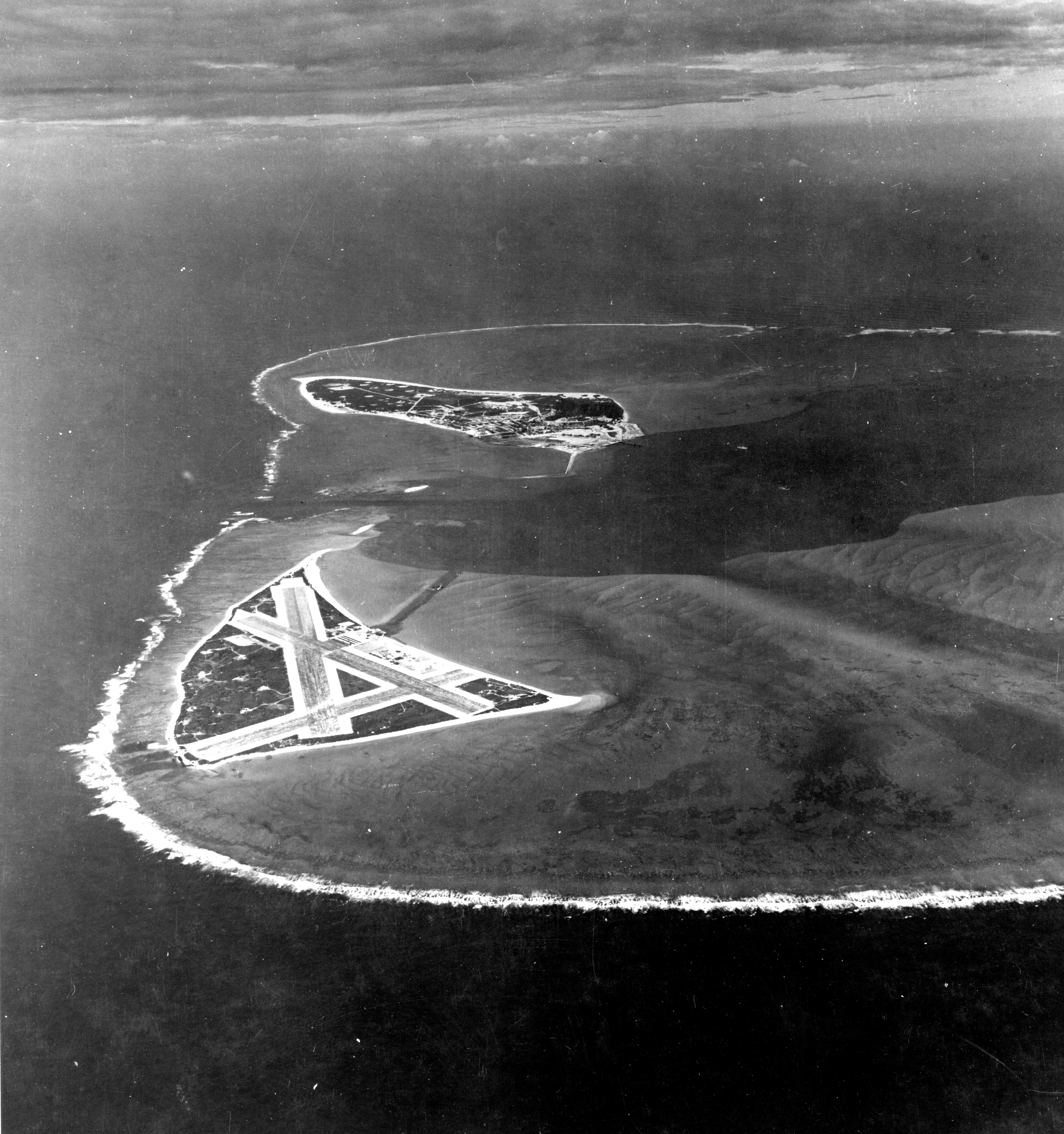
NAS Midway a few days prior to attack

== Recipients ==
This indicates that the Medal of Honor was awarded posthumously.

Image	Name	Service	Rank	Ship / Unit	Place of action	Notes
Head of a middle-aged white man with thinning hair, wearing a dark suit coat, white shirt, and dark tie.	Mervyn S. Bennion	Navy	Captain	USS West Virginia	Pearl Harbor, Oahu, Territory of Hawaii	While mortally wounded, he remained in command of USS West Virginia. For conspicuous devotion to duty, extraordinary courage, and complete disregard of his own life, he was awarded the Medal of Honor.
	John W. Finn	Navy	Chief Aviation Ordnanceman	Patrol Bombing Squadron 11	Naval Air Station Kaneohe Bay, Oahu, Territory of Hawaii	Stationed at NAS Kaneohe Bay, HI, he demonstrated extraordinary valor during the Japanese air assault on Oahu. Finn manned an exposed 50-caliber machine gun stand and returned significant fire upon Japanese aircraft. Despite numerous painful wounds, he remained at his post and inflicted heavy damage upon the Japanese until ordered to seek medical attention.
	Francis C. Flaherty	Navy	Ensign	USS Oklahoma	Pearl Harbor	During the evacuation of USS Oklahoma, he remained in a turret, holding a flashlight so the remainder of the turret crew could see to escape, thereby sacrificing his own life.
	Samuel G. Fuqua	Navy	Lieutenant Commander	USS Arizona	Pearl Harbor	Incapacitated in the initial bombing of USS Arizona, he recovered to direct the fighting of the fires and the rescue of wounded and injured personnel. He stayed on deck through the continuous bombing and strafing, leading in a calm and cool manner that resulted in the saving of many lives.
	Edwin J. Hill	Navy	Chief Boatswain	USS Nevada	Pearl Harbor	During the height of the strafing and bombing of USS Nevada, led his men of the linehandling details to the quays, cast off the lines and swam back to his ship. Back on board, while attempting to let go the anchors, was blown overboard and killed by the explosion of several bombs.
	Herbert C. Jones	Navy	Ensign	USS California	Pearl Harbor	Organized and led a party to supply ammunition to the antiaircraft battery of USS California after the mechanical hoists were put out of action when he was fatally wounded by a bomb explosion. When 2 men attempted to take him from the area, he ordered "Leave me alone! I am done for. Get out of here before the magazines go off."
	Isaac C. Kidd	Navy	Rear Admiral	Battleship Division One	Pearl Harbor	Remained on the bridge of USS Arizona, discharging his duties as Commander of Battleship Division One and Senior Officer Present Afloat even as the ship blew up from magazine explosions, until a direct bomb hit on the bridge resulted in the loss of his life.
	Jackson C. Pharris	Navy	Gunner	USS California	Pearl Harbor	In charge of an ordnance repair party on USS California, severely injured by explosions and twice rendered unconscious by nauseous oil fumes while setting up a hand-supply ammunition train for the antiaircraft guns, ordering shipfitters to counterflood to address a list (keeping the California in action), repeatedly entered flooding compartments to drag unconscious shipmates to safety.
	Thomas James Reeves	Navy	Chief Radioman	USS California	Pearl Harbor	After the mechanized ammunition hoists were put out of action in USS California, in a burning passageway, assisted in ammunition supply by hand to the antiaircraft guns until he was killed by smoke and fire.
	Donald K. Ross	Navy	Chief Machinist	USS Nevada	Pearl Harbor	Forced his men to leave the untenable forward dynamo room of USS Nevada and performed all the duties himself until unconscious, returned to dynamo room after being resuscitated, worked the after dynamo room until unconscious, recovered and returned to his station until directed to abandon it.
	Robert R. Scott	Navy	Machinist's mate First Class	USS California	Pearl Harbor	When his battle station compartment flooded on USS California, site of an air compressor for the guns, Scott refused to leave as "This is my station and I will stay and give them air as long as the guns are going."
	Peter Tomich	Navy	Chief Watertender	USS Utah	Pearl Harbor	Although realizing that USS Utah was capsizing, remained at his post in the engineering plant until he saw that all boilers were secured and all fireroom personnel had left their stations.
	Franklin Van Valkenburgh	Navy	Captain	USS Arizona	Pearl Harbor	Remained on the bridge of USS Arizona, discharging his duties as Commanding Officer of the ship even as it blew up from magazine explosions, until a direct bomb hit on the bridge resulted in the loss of his life.
	James R. Ward	Navy	Seaman First Class	USS Oklahoma	Pearl Harbor	During evacuation of USS Oklahoma, remained in a turret, holding a flashlight so the remainder of the turret crew could see to escape, thereby sacrificing his own life.
Head of middle-aged white man wearing a white jacket with black shoulderboards and a white peaked cap with a black visor.	Cassin Young	Navy	Commander	USS Vestal	Pearl Harbor	Moved his ship, USS Vestal, away from the battleship USS Arizona, and subsequently beached it upon determining that such action was required to save his ship.

== Midway ==
The Japanese fleet that attacked Pearl Harbor also struck elsewhere in the Hawaiian Islands that day, trying to disable the U.S. Marine base on Sand Island at Midway Atoll. For his actions during that engagement, a 16th Medal of Honor was awarded to a Marine who died at Sand Island on this first day of the Pacific War.

This indicates that the Medal of Honor was awarded posthumously.

Image	Name	Service	Rank	Ship / Unit	Place of action	Notes
Head and shoulders of a young white man with wavy, neatly combed, hair wearing a dark jacket with large bright buttons, a high stiff collar, a strap laying diagonally across the chest, and two pins on his left breast.	George H. Cannon	Marine Corps	First Lieutenant	6th Defense Battalion	Naval Air Station Midway, Sand Island, Midway Atoll, Territory of Hawaii	Refused to be evacuated from his post until after his men, who had been wounded by the same shell that wounded him, were evacuated, and directed the reorganization of his Command Post until forcibly removed.

== See also ==
- Francis P. Hammerberg - posthumous Navy Medal of Honor recipient for noncombat action (rescue operations) in the West Loch of Pearl Harbor in February 1945.
