= Herbert Jones =

Herbert Jones may refer to:

== Military ==
- Herbert M. Jones (1898–1990), U.S. Army general
- Herbert C. Jones (1918–1941), U.S. Navy officer in Pearl Harbor; Medal of Honor recipient
  - USS Herbert C. Jones, an Edsall-class destroyer escort
- H. Jones (1940–1982), British Army officer in Falklands War; VC recipient

== Religion ==
- Herbert Jones (bishop) (1861–1920), English clergyman, bishop of Lewes and archdeacon of Chichester
- Herbert Gresford Jones (1870–1958), Anglican bishop, bishop of Warrington
- Herbert Jones (priest) (1887–1969), dean of Manchester

== Sports ==
- Herbert Richard Jones (1885-1950), English footballers turned manager and President of Real Betis
- Herbert Jones (footballer, born 1896) (1896–1973), Blackburn Rovers and England footballer
- Herb Jones (footballer) (1915–1992), Australian rules footballer
- Herbert Jones (footballer, born 1929) (1929–2020), Welsh footballer who played for Wrexham
- Herbert Jones (jockey) (1880–1951), English jockey whose horse killed the women's suffrage campaigner Emily Davison
- Herbert Jones (racing driver) (1904–1926), American racing driver
- Herbert Jones (basketball) (born 1998), American basketball player

== Other ==
- Herbert C. Jones (politician) (1880–1970), California politician
- Herbert Ladd Jones (1858–1921), Canadian politician
- Herbert W. Jones (1927–2002), American physicist
- Herbie Jones (1926–2001), American jazz trumpeter and arranger

== See also ==
- Bert Jones (disambiguation)
