= Camille McKayle =

Jamaican-American mathematician

- Born: Camille Althea McKayle; 1964 (age 61–62); Jamaica
- Education: Bates College (BS); Lehigh University (MS, PhD)

Camille Althea McKayle-Stolz (born 1964) is an Afro-Jamaican-American mathematician and is the current Provost of the University of the Virgin Islands (UVI). She holds a PhD in mathematics from Lehigh University and taught undergraduates at Lafayette College and UVI from 1993 to 2008.

In 2008, she became Interim Dean of Science and Mathematics at UVI and four years later was made interim provost. She became the permanent Provost in 2014. McKayle's research focuses on expanding participation of STEM curricula to minority populations.

McKayle will become Executive Director of the Mathematical Association of America in September 2026.

== Early life and education ==
Camille Althea McKayle was born in 1964 in Jamaica, where she completed her primary education and began her secondary schooling. She then moved to New York, where she completed high school and enrolled in mathematics, receiving her Bachelor of Science from Bates College of Lewiston, Maine, in 1985.

McKayle went on to further her education earning a Master of Science and PhD in mathematics at Lehigh University in Bethlehem, Pennsylvania. in 1993. She completed her thesis Types of Differential Equations Using Polynomial Operators under the direction of Gregory T. McAllister. Around the time of her graduation, McKayle married Robert C. Stolz.

== Early teaching career ==
McKayle began her career in Easton, Pennsylvania, teaching at Lafayette College from 1993 to 1996. At that time, she moved to the Virgin Islands, taking a post as an assistant professor of mathematics at the University of the Virgin Islands (UVI). While teaching undergraduate math courses, McKayle designed and implemented programs to address the under-representation of minority groups in Science, technology, engineering, and mathematics (STEM) curricula.

In her outreach work, she targeted programs to develop interest in STEM courses for elementary students. Some of the programs she worked on included Girls Exploring Math Stuff (GEMS), a program for 6th grade girls; MathLab, which targets students from the 3rd to the 7th grades; Science Awareness Saturday Academies and the Summer Science Enrichment Academies, as well as workshops for teachers.

In 2005, McKayle was promoted to an Associate Professor with tenure at UVI and that same year, began working as a Program Officer at the National Science Foundation, in the Historically Black Colleges and Universities Undergraduate Program overseeing grants and grant proposals for STEM subjects.

=== NSF grant ===
In 1999, McKayle was the driving force to secure a $3.5 million National Science Foundation grant targeted toward increasing expenditures for STEM students at the University of the Virgin Islands. The funds were to be used to improve curricula, purchase equipment and provide scholarships. McKayle oversaw the program as its director and the university president served as the principal investigator for the project. McKayle was one of four teachers honored with the Millennium Award for outstanding teaching in 2000.

The honor, presented by the White House Initiative on Historically Black Colleges, recognized McKayle, and fellow teachers Juliette B. Bell of Fayetteville State University, Paul Hudrlik of Howard University and Ashok K. Kabi Satpathy of South Carolina State University. Herbert W. Jones of Florida A&M University and Ronald E. Mickens of Clark Atlanta University were recognized by the initiative for outstanding research. In 2003, she became coordinator of the Experimental Program to Stimulate Competitive Research (VI-EPSCoR), with responsibility to oversee a new grant designed to improve K-12 mathematics education on the island.

=== UVI Provost ===
Upon her return to UVI after two years working with the National Science Foundation, McKayle was promoted to Interim Dean of Science and Mathematics in 2008. After serving as dean for four years, in July 2012, she was promoted to Interim Provost at UVI. In 2014, her appointment as Provost became permanent and simultaneously she became the Vice President for Academic Affairs.

== Notable works ==
McKayle has served as a principal investigator or co-principal on numerous grant projects focused on improving education in math and sciences including Computer Science, Engineering, and Mathematics Scholarships Program (2002–2007), Comprehensive Approach to Retention and Persistence in STEM (2011–2014), PIRE: Context Sensitive Implementation of Synergistic Water-Energy Systems (2013–2018), Mare Nostrum Caribbean: Stewardship through Strategic Research and Workforce Development (2014–2019), Achieving Competitive Excellence Implementation Projects (2016–2021), HBCU-UP Collaborative for the Advancement of STEM Leadership (2016–2018)
