= 1929 College Basketball All-Southern Team =

The 1929 College Basketball All-Southern Team consisted of basketball players from the South chosen at their respective positions.

== All-Southerns ==
=== Guards ===
- Billy Werber, Duke (LB-1)
- Louis McGinnis, Kentucky (LB-1)
- Maurice Johnson, NC State (LB-2)
- Dewitt Laird, Mississippi (LB-2)

=== Forwards ===
- Robert Selby, Mississippi (LB-1)
- Larry Haar, NC State (LB-2)
- Henry Palmer, Georgia (LB-2)

=== Center ===
- Frank Goodwin, NC State (LB-1)
- Sandford Sanford, Georgia (LB-1 [as f])
- Joe Croson, Duke (LB-2)

== Key ==
- LB = chosen by Lester Belding, UNC scout.
