= Bert Jones (disambiguation) =

Bert Jones (born 1951) is an American football quarterback.

Bert Jones may also refer to:

- Bert Jones (footballer), see Ivor Jones
- Bert Jones (politician) (born 1962), politician in the North Carolina General Assembly
- Bert Jones (public servant) (died 1977), Australian public servant
- Bert Jones (rugby, born 1906) (1906–1982), Welsh rugby union and rugby league player
- Bert Jones (rugby union, born 1918) (1918–1998), English rugby union player

== See also ==
- Bertram Jones (disambiguation)
- Albert Jones (disambiguation)
- Herbert Jones (disambiguation)
- Robert Jones (disambiguation)
- Hubert Jones (disambiguation)
- Burt Jones (born 1979), American politician
