= Hubert Jones (disambiguation) =

Hubert Jones was a British flying ace.

Hubert Jones may also refer to:

- Hubert Jones (rugby union)

== See also ==
- Hubert Cunliffe-Jones
- Bert Jones (disambiguation)
