= USS John Finn =

Arleigh Burke-class destroyer

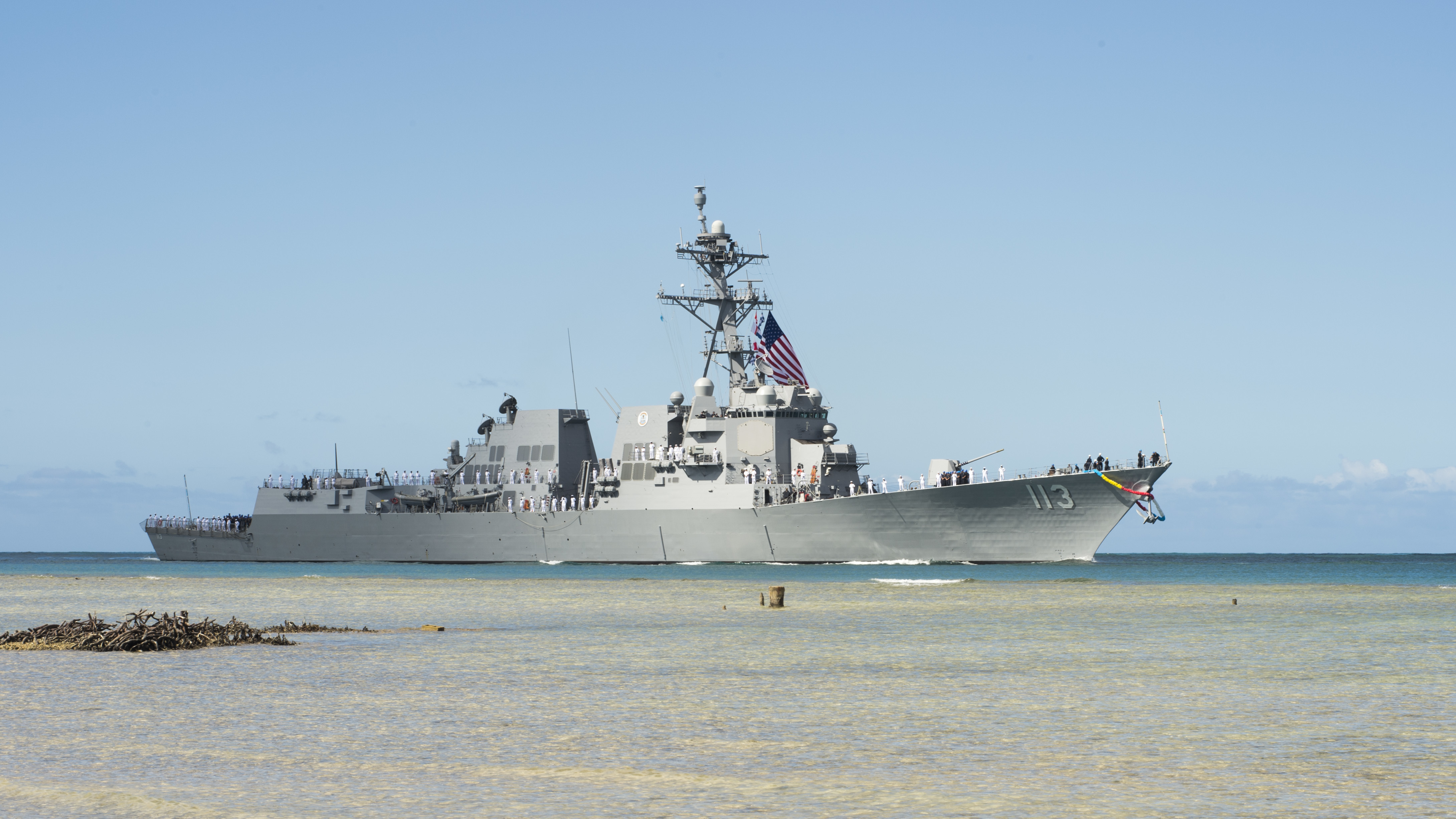
- John Finn at Pearl Harbor on 10 July 2017

History

United States
- Name: John Finn
- Namesake: John William Finn
- Ordered: 15 June 2011
- Builder: Ingalls Shipbuilding
- Laid down: 5 November 2013
- Launched: 28 March 2015
- Sponsored by: Laura Stavridis
- Christened: 2 May 2015
- Acquired: 7 December 2016
- Commissioned: 15 July 2017
- Home port: Yokosuka, Japan
- Identification: MMSI number: 368926095; Hull number: DDG-113
- Motto: Status et Pugno
- Honors and awards: See Awards
- Status: in active service
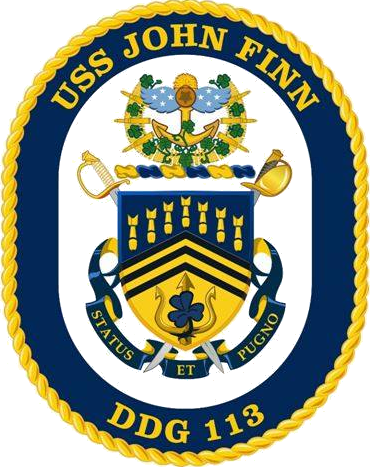
- Badge

General characteristics
- Class & type: Arleigh Burke-class destroyer
- Displacement: 9,217 tons (full load)
- Length: 513 ft (156 m)
- Beam: 66 ft (20 m)
- Propulsion: 4 × General Electric LM2500 gas turbines 100,000 shp (75,000 kW)
- Speed: 30 kn (56 km/h; 35 mph)
- Complement: 380 officers and enlisted
- Armament: Guns: 1 × 5-inch (127 mm)/62 mk 45 mod 4 (lightweight gun); 1 × 20 mm (0.8 in) Phalanx CIWS; 2 × 25 mm (0.98 in) Mk 38 machine gun system; 4 × 0.50 inches (12.7 mm) caliber guns; Lasers: Optical Dazzling Interdictor, Navy (ODIN); Missiles: 1 × 32-cell, 1 × 64-cell (96 total cells) Mk 41 vertical launching system (VLS): RIM-66M surface-to-air missile; RIM-156 surface-to-air missile; RIM-174A standard ERAM; RIM-161 anti-ballistic missile; RIM-162 ESSM (quad-packed); BGM-109 Tomahawk cruise missile; RUM-139 vertical launch ASROC; Torpedoes: 2 × Mark 32 triple torpedo tubes: Mark 46 lightweight torpedo; Mark 50 lightweight torpedo; Mark 54 lightweight torpedo
- Aircraft carried: MH-60R Helicopters

USS John Finn (DDG-113) is an Arleigh Burke-class (Flight IIA Restart) Aegis guided missile destroyer in service with the United States Navy. The contract to build her was awarded to Ingalls Shipbuilding of Pascagoula, Mississippi, on 15 June 2011. Ingalls has been a subsidiary of Huntington Ingalls Industries (HII) since its acquisition in April 2001. Prior to the award, Ingalls had constructed 28 Arleigh Burke-class destroyers, the last one of which was USS William P. Lawrence. On 15 February 2011, Secretary of the Navy Ray Mabus announced the ship's name to be John Finn after John William Finn, the first Medal of Honor recipient of World War II. He was so honored for machine-gunning Japanese warplanes for over two hours during the December 1941 attack on Pearl Harbor despite being shot in the foot and shoulder, and suffering numerous shrapnel wounds. He retired as a lieutenant after thirty years of service and died at age 100 in 2010.

== Design ==
John Finn is the 63rd Arleigh Burke-class destroyer, the first of which, USS Arleigh Burke, was commissioned in July 1991. With 89 ships planned to be built so far, the class has the longest production run for any U.S. Navy surface combatant. During its long production run, the class was built in three flights: Flight I (DDG-51 to DDG-71), Flight II/IIA/IIA T.I. (DDG-72 to DDG-124 & DDG-127), and Flight III (DDG-125, DDG-126 & DDG-128 to DDG-139). The Arleigh Burke-class was also the first in the U.S. Navy to include anti-NBC (Nuclear, Biological, and Chemical) warfare protection. John Finn is a Flight IIA ship, and as such, features several improvements in terms of ballistic missile defense, and the inclusion of mine-detecting ability. As an Arleigh Burke-class ship, John Finn's roles include anti-aircraft, anti-submarine, and anti-surface warfare, as well as strike operations.

== Construction ==
In November 2013, John Finn's keel was laid down at Ingalls Shipbuilding. The keel laying ceremony was attended by Laura Stavridis, the ship sponsor and former wife of retired Admiral James Stavridis. The ship was launched on 28 March 2015 and christened on 2 May 2015. On 7 December 2016, the 75th anniversary of the attack on Pearl Harbor, the ship was delivered to the U.S. Navy. The precommissioning crew moved on board the ship on 28 February 2017 and the vessel was commissioned on 15 July 2017 in Pearl Harbor, Hawaii, then homeported to San Diego, California.

== History ==
On 17 November 2020, John Finn successfully intercepted an ICBM using a SM-3 Block IIA missile. The target missile was launched from the test site on the Kwajalein Atoll and simulated an attack on Hawaii. This was the first time that an ICBM had been successfully intercepted by an SM-3 and the first time a U.S. Navy ship had brought down such a missile.

On 14 February 2023 she homeport shifted to Yokosuka, Japan.

On 6 August 2023, John Finn and three other destroyers responded to a joint Chinese-Russian patrol in international waters near Alaska. The Chinese-Russian flotilla left without incident.

Under the United States Seventh Fleet, on 24 January 2024, John Finn sailed through the sensitive Taiwan Strait following presidential and parliamentary elections on the island, drawing the ire of Beijing. "John Finn's transit through the Taiwan Strait demonstrates the United States' commitment to upholding freedom of navigation for all nations as a principle," the U.S. Navy said in its statement.

=== Deployments ===
- Maiden deployment December 2020 - April 2021
- 7th Fleet Super Garuda Shield July 2025

==== Awards ====
- Battle "E" – (2019, 2020, 2021)
- Navy Sea Service Deployment Ribbon - (2020)
