= Bertram Jones =

Bertram Jones may refer to:

- Earl Jones (investment advisor) (Bertram Earl Jones, born 1942), Canadian non-practicing investment adviser
- Bert Jones (born 1951), American football quarterback

== See also ==
- Bert Jones (disambiguation)
