= John William Finn =

US Navy Medal of Honor recipient (1909–2010)

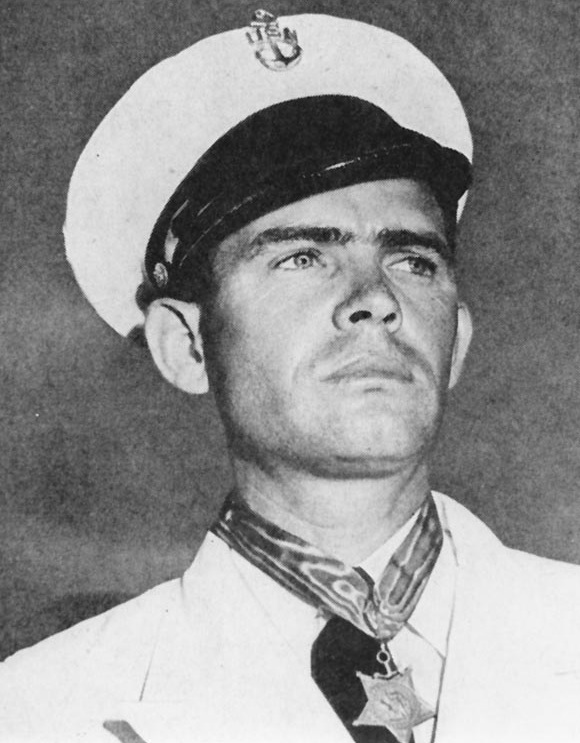
- John William Finn wearing his Medal of Honor
- Born: 24 July 1909; Los Angeles County, California, U.S.
- Died: 27 May 2010 (aged 100); Chula Vista, California, U.S.
- Burial place: Saint Carmel Cemetery, Campo Indian Reservation; 32°39′2″N 116°21′53″W
- Military career
- Allegiance: United States
- Branch: United States Navy
- Service years: 1926–1956
- Rank: Lieutenant
- Unit: VP-11
- Conflicts: World War II; Attack on Pearl Harbor; Battle off Samar; Battle of Wake Island
- Awards: Medal of Honor; Purple Heart

John William Finn (24 July 1909 – 27 May 2010) was a sailor in the United States Navy who, as a chief petty officer and aviation ordnanceman, received the United States military's highest decoration, the Medal of Honor, for his actions during the attack on Pearl Harbor in World War II. Though ordnancemen are only responsible for performing maintenance on guns and handling of munitions, Finn – when the Japanese bombed Naval Air Station Kaneohe Bay during the 7 December attack – earned the medal by firing a machine gun from an exposed position throughout the attack, despite being repeatedly wounded. He continued to serve in the Navy and in 1942 was commissioned an ensign. In 1947 he was reverted to chief petty officer, eventually rising to lieutenant before his 1956 retirement. In his later years he made many appearances at events celebrating veterans. At the time of his death, Finn was the oldest living Medal of Honor recipient, the last living recipient from the attack on Pearl Harbor, and the last living United States Navy recipient of World War II.

== Early life ==
Born on 24 July 1909, in Compton, California, Finn dropped out of school after the seventh grade. He enlisted in the Navy in July 1926, shortly before his seventeenth birthday, and completed recruit training in San Diego. After a brief stint with a ceremonial guard company, he attended General Aviation Utilities Training at Naval Station Great Lakes, graduating in December. By April 1927 he was back in the San Diego area, having been assigned to Naval Air Station North Island. He initially worked in aircraft repair before becoming an aviation ordnanceman and working on anti-aircraft guns. He then served on a series of ships: USS Lexington, USS Houston, USS Jason, USS Saratoga, and USS Cincinnati.

Finn was promoted to chief petty officer (E-7, the highest enlisted rank in the Navy at that time) on June 5, 1935 after only eight years of active duty. He later commented on his promotions, "Everybody thought I was a boy wonder. I was just in the right place at the right time." As a chief, Finn served with patrol squadrons in San Diego, Washington, and Panama.

== Attack on Pearl Harbor ==
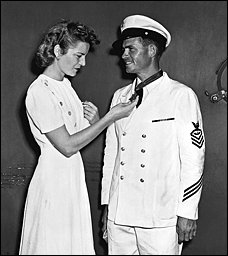
Alice Finn (left) admires the Medal of Honor her husband John W. Finn (right) received for his defense of Naval Air Station Kaneohe Bay during the Japanese attack on Pearl Harbor on 7 December 1941.

By December 1941, Finn was stationed at Naval Air Station Kaneohe Bay on the island of Oahu in Hawaii. As a chief aviation ordnanceman, he was in charge of twenty men whose primary task was to maintain the weapons of VP-11, a PBY Catalina flying boat squadron. At 7:48 a.m. on the morning of Sunday, 7 December 1941, Finn was at his home, about a mile from the aircraft hangars, when he heard the sound of gunfire. Finn recalled how a neighbor was the first to alert him, when she knocked on his door saying, "They want you down at the squadron right away!" He drove to the hangars, catching sight of Japanese planes in the sky on the way, and found that the airbase was being attacked, with most of the PBYs already on fire.

Finn's men were trying to fight back by using the machine guns mounted in the PBYs, either by firing from inside the flaming planes or by detaching the guns and mounting them on improvised stands. Finn later explained that one of the first things he did was to take control of a machine gun from his squadron's painter. "I said, 'Alex, let me take that gun' ... knew that I had more experience firing a machine gun than a painter."

Finding a movable tripod platform used for gunnery training, Finn attached the .50 caliber machine gun and pushed the platform into an open area, from which he had a clear view of the attacking aircraft. He fired on the Japanese planes for the next two hours, even after being seriously wounded, until the attack had ended. In total, he received 21 distinct wounds, including a bullet through his right foot and an injury to his left shoulder, which caused him to lose feeling in his left arm.

"I got that gun and I started shooting at Jap planes," Finn said in a 2009 interview. "I was out there shooting the Jap planes and just every so often I was a target for some," he said, "In some cases, I could see their [the Japanese pilots'] faces."

Despite his wounds, Finn returned to the hangars later that day. After receiving medical treatment, he helped arm the surviving American planes. His actions earned him the first Medal of Honor to be awarded in World War II. He was formally presented with the decoration on 14 September 1942, by Admiral Chester Nimitz, for courage and valor beyond the call of duty. The ceremony took place in Pearl Harbor on board USS Enterprise.

In 1942 Finn was commissioned, and served as a Limited Duty Officer with the rank of ensign. In 1947 he was reverted to his enlisted rank of chief petty officer, eventually becoming a lieutenant with Bombing Squadron VB-102 and aboard USS Hancock. He retired from the Navy as a lieutenant in September 1956.

== Later life and legacy ==
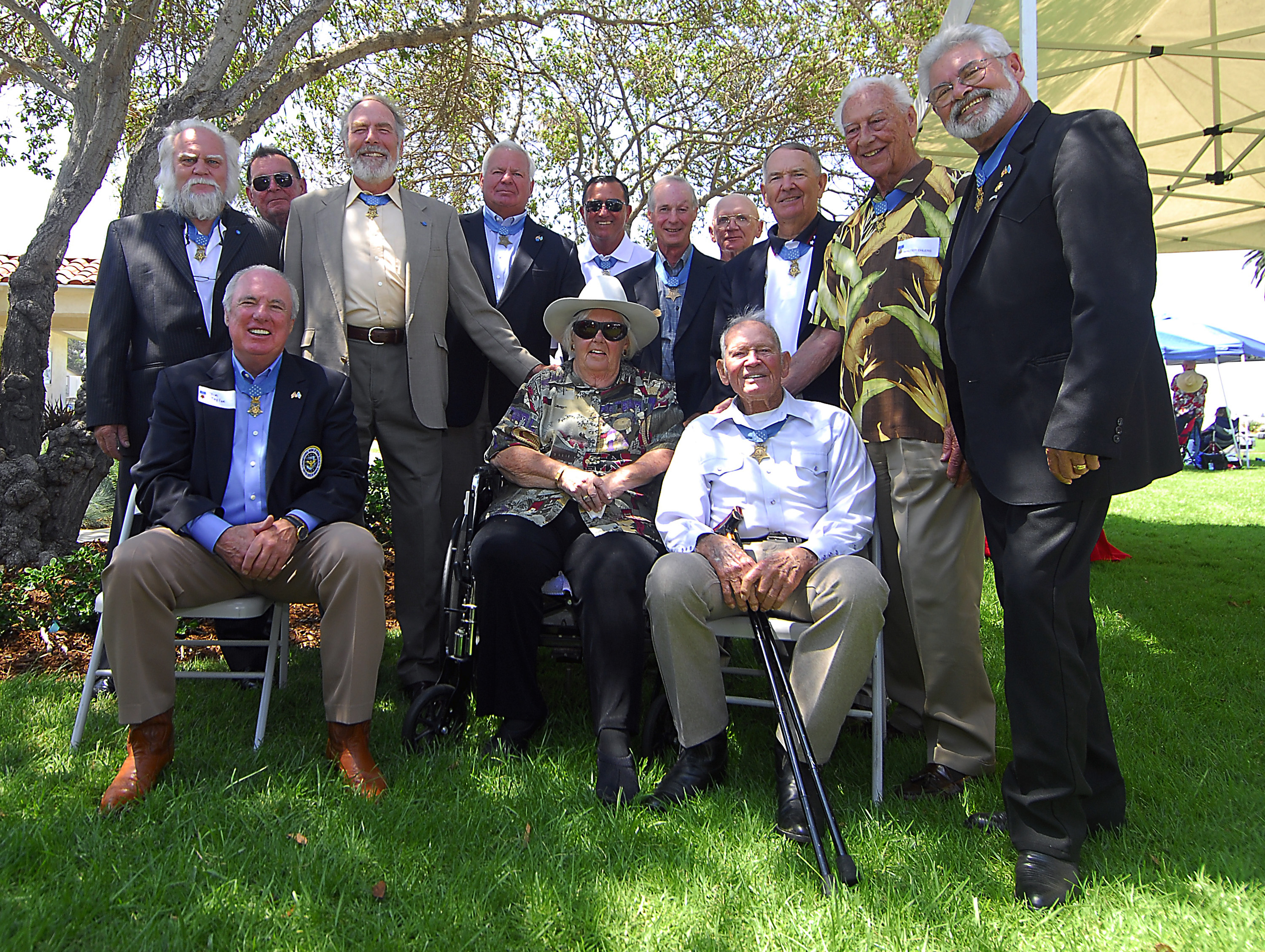
Finn, seated at bottom right, with other Medal of Honor recipients during a celebration of his 100th birthday 25 July 2009. Front row, left to right: James Allen Taylor; Sybil Stockdale, widow of James Stockdale; John W. Finn Back row, left to right: Leonard B. Keller; Harold A. Fritz; Drew Dennis Dix; Michael E. Thornton; Jay R. Vargas; Thomas R. Norris; Robert J. Modrzejewski; Walter Joseph Marm; Walter D. Ehlers; Jon R. Cavaiani

From 1956 until shortly before his death, Finn resided on a 90-acre (0.36 km^{2}) ranch in Live Oak Springs, near Pine Valley, California. He and his wife became foster parents to five Native American children, causing him to be embraced by the Campo Band of Diegueño Mission Indians, a tribe of Kumeyaay people in San Diego. His wife, Alice Finn, died in 1998. John Finn was a member of the John Birch Society.

In his retirement he made many appearances at events honoring veterans. On 25 March 2009, he attended National Medal of Honor Day ceremonies at Arlington National Cemetery. With the aid of walking sticks, he stood beside U.S. President Barack Obama during a wreath-laying ceremony at the Tomb of the Unknown Soldier. Later that day, Finn was a guest at the White House. It was his first visit to the White House, and his first time meeting a sitting president.

On 27 June 2009, a crowd of over 2,000 made up of family, friends and well-wishers came to Pine Valley to celebrate Finn's 100th birthday. The Association of Aviation Ordnancemen presented him with an American flag which had flown on each of the 11 aircraft carriers then in active service.

When called a hero during a 2009 interview Finn responded:

That damned hero stuff is a bunch [of] crap, I guess. [...] You gotta understand that there's all kinds of heroes, but they never get a chance to be in a hero's position.

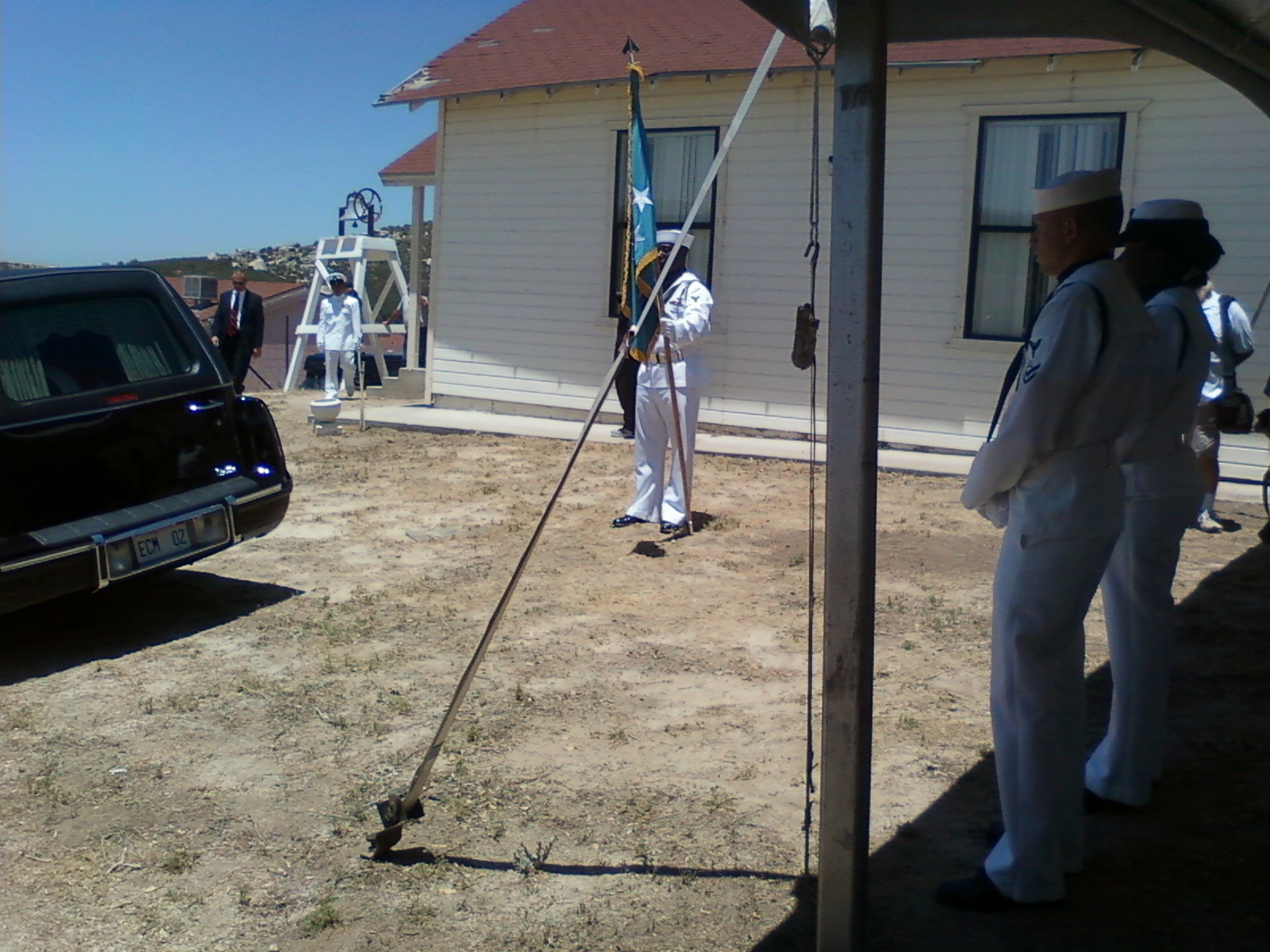
Hearse carrying the remains of Finn.

Finn died at age 100 on the morning of 27 May 2010, at the Chula Vista Veterans Home. He was buried beside his wife at the Campo Indian Reservation's cemetery, after a memorial service in El Cajon. He was the last surviving Medal of Honor recipient from the attack on Pearl Harbor, the oldest living recipient, and the only aviation ordnanceman to have ever received the medal. Upon his death, fellow World War II veteran Barney F. Hajiro became the oldest living Medal of Honor recipient.

=== Namesake ===
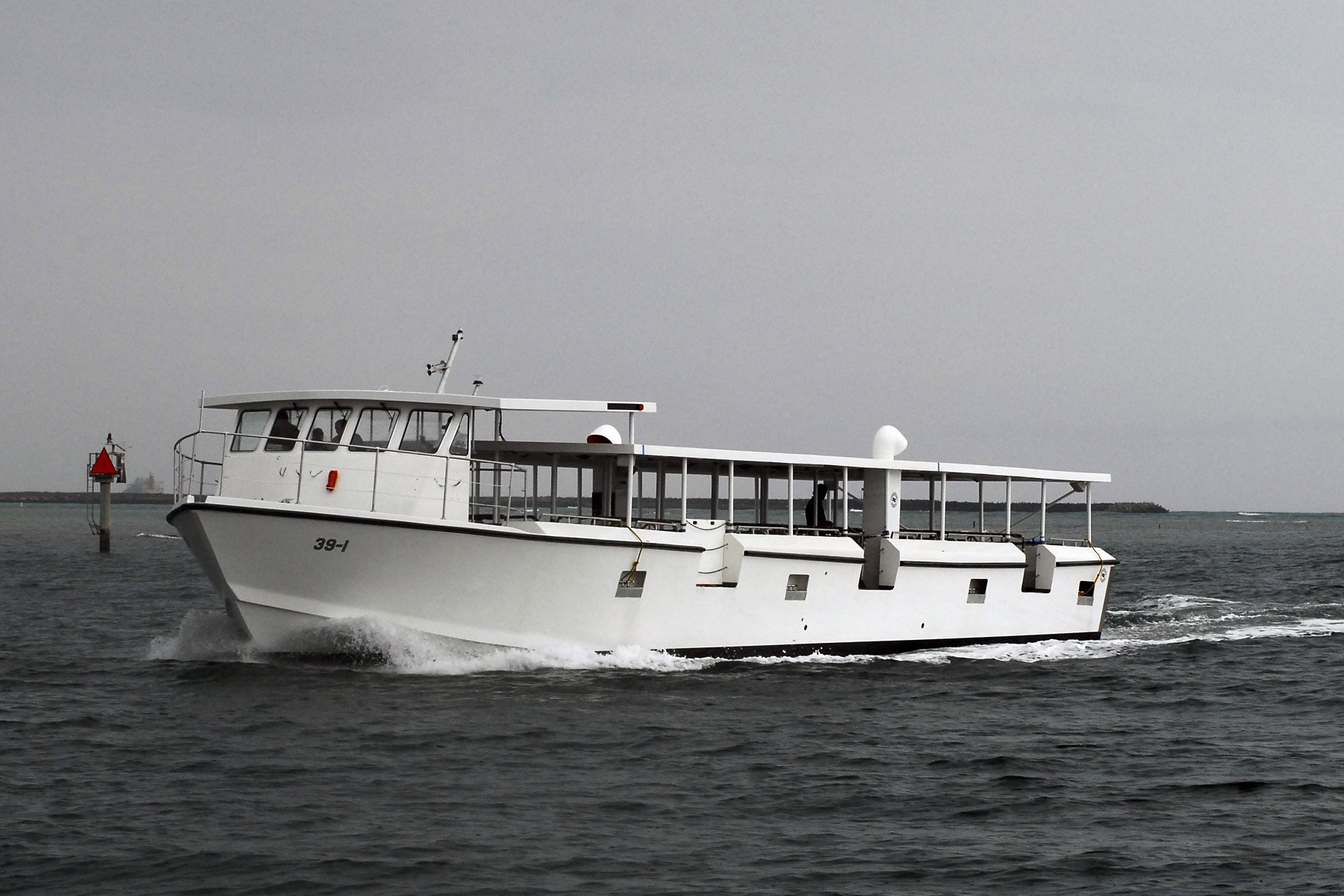
U.S. Navy ferry boat John W. Finn

The headquarters building for Commander, Patrol and Reconnaissance Force, United States Pacific Fleet at Marine Corps Base Hawaii Kaneohe was named in Finn's honor, and in 2009 a boat used to bring visitors to the USS Arizona Memorial was also named after him. In that same year, part of Historic U.S. Route 80, was named "John Finn Route". Three buildings in the former Naval Training Center San Diego were named the John and Alice Finn Office Plaza. On 15 February 2012, the U.S. Secretary of the Navy Ray Mabus announced that an Arleigh Burke-class destroyer would be named USS John Finn (DDG-113) in his honor.

=== Depictions in the media ===
Chief Aviation Ordnanceman John W. Finn was portrayed in the 1970 film Tora! Tora! Tora!. He regarded highly for its accuracy. He was depicted by an uncredited actor in two scenes at the height of the attack, at the PBY base on Naval Air Station Kaneohe Bay. He is shown in a sandbagged emplacement, firing a water-cooled .50 caliber machine gun with tall antiaircraft sights. The first scene shows him trading fire with strafing Japanese Zeros and then spinning around to fire after them at they fly over him. He is shown later, with his fatigues shredded by shrapnel, shooting down a Zero which the pilot crashes into a hangar. He disliked the 2001 film Pearl Harbor.

== Medal of Honor citation ==
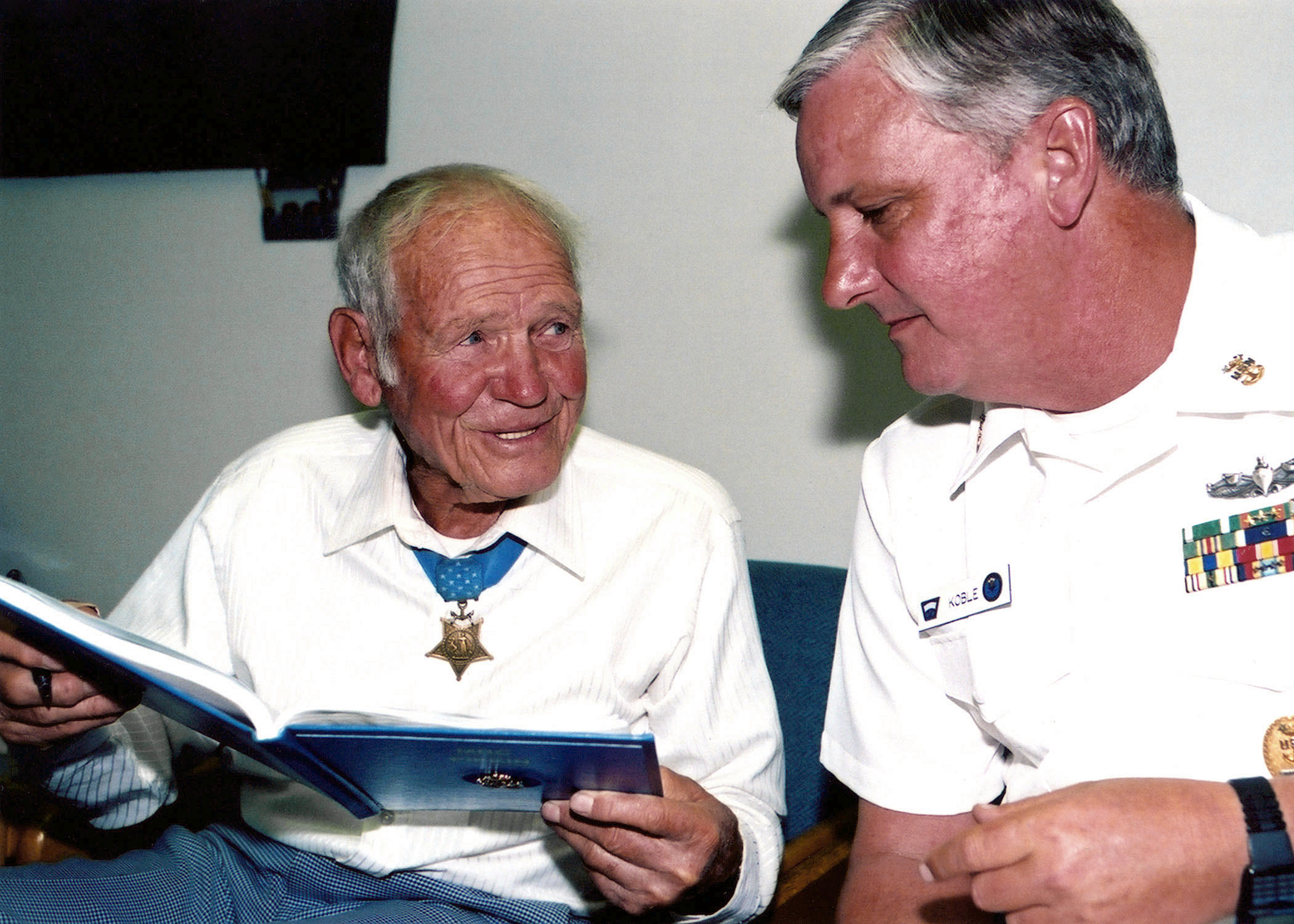
John W. Finn (left) at Naval Amphibious Base Coronado in 2001

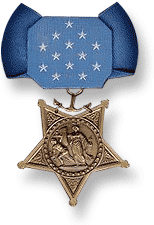

For extraordinary heroism, distinguished service, and devotion above and beyond the call of duty. During the first attack by Japanese airplanes on the Naval Air Station, Kaneohe Bay, Territory of Hawaii, on December 7, 1941, he promptly secured and manned a .50 caliber machine gun mounted on an instruction stand in a completely exposed section of the parking ramp, which was under heavy enemy machine gun strafing fire. Although painfully wounded many times, he continued to man this gun and to return the enemy's fire vigorously and with telling effect throughout the enemy strafing and bombing attacks and with complete disregard for his own personal safety. It was only by specific orders that he was persuaded to leave his post to seek medical attention. Following first-aid treatment, although obviously suffering much pain and moving with great difficulty, he returned to the squadron area and actively supervised the rearming of returning planes. His extraordinary heroism and conduct in this action are considered to be in keeping with the highest traditions of the Naval Service.

== See also ==
- List of Medal of Honor recipients for World War II
- List of Medal of Honor recipients for the Attack on Pearl Harbor
