= Marine Barracks, Naval Air Station Midway =

- Active: 1 Mar 1941 – 31 Oct 1949
- Country: United States of America
- Branch: United States Marine Corps
- Type: Air Defense/Coastal Defense (WWII)
- Size: ~Approx 800 men (1942)
- Engagements: World War II; *First Bombardment of Midway; *Battle of Midway

Commanders
- Current commander: N/A
- Notable commanders: Charles I. Murray; Harold D. Shannon

The Marine Barracks, Naval Air Station Midway was a United States Marine Corps detachment responsible for security at Naval Air Station Midway following World War II. The unit was originally formed in March 1941 as the 6th Defense Battalion with the mission of providing air and coastal defense for advanced naval bases. During the war the battalion is most noted for defending Midway Atoll against Japanses air raids during the Battle of Midway. The 6th Defense Battalion garrisoned Midway for the remainder of the war and was later re-designated as the Marine Barracks, Naval Air Station Midway on 1 February 1946. Marine Barracks Midway was decommissioned on 31 October 1949

== History ==
=== World War II ===
==== Formation, training and movement to Midway ====
The 6th Defense Battalion was commissioned on 1 March 1941 in San Diego, California. After formation and initial training the battalion departed San Diego on board the USS Wharton (AP-7), arriving at Pearl Harbor on 22 July 1941. The battalion's main body departed Hawaii on 7 September, arriving at Midway Atoll on 11 September. The 6th Defense Battalion relieved the 3rd Defense Battalion on Midway and continued defensive preparations.

==== Early action during the war ====
On 7 December 1941, upon hearing of the Attack on Pearl Harbor, the 6th Defense Battalion immediately went to general quarters; however, no attacks transpired that day. That evening, two destroyers from the Imperial Japanese Navy, the Sazanami and Ushio began shelling the atoll for 23 minutes. One 5-inch battery from the 6th Defense Battalion engaged the destroyers during their second run until they departed the area. During this engagement, First Lieutenant George H. Cannon was mortally wounded; however, he refused evacuation while reorganizing his battery's command post. For his actions he was posthumously awarded the Medal of Honor. In total, ten marines from the battalion were killed in action and an additional ten more were wounded in action.

The battalion received additional reinforcements at the end of December with the arrival of the seaplane tender USS Tangier carrying personnel from the 4th Defense Battalion and more importantly, ground based radars for the early detection of incoming Japanese aircraft.

The next attack on Midway occurred on the evening of 25 January 1942, when a Japanese submarine, nicknamed "Oscar" by the defenders of the island, surfaced and began shelling Sand Island. Batteries from the 6th Defense Battalion engaged; however, these attacks continued off and on for the next few days until the submarine was caught out in the open and strafed by Marine fighter planes from VMF-221.

==== Battle of Midway ====
Our job is to hold Midway....Keep cool, calm, and collected; make your bullets count.

— LtCol Harold D. Shannon, Commanding Officer, 6th Defense Battalion.

On 2 May 1942, Admiral Chester W. Nimitz spent the entire day at Midway inspecting the island. He spent a great deal of time with LtCol Shannon and inquired about what his defense battalion required in order to repel an amphibious assault. LtCol Shannon also assured Nimitz that if properly supported he could hold the island. Upon returning to his headquarters at Pearl Harbor, Admiral Nimitz wrote a joint letter to LtCol Shannon and Commander Cyril T. Simard, Commanding Officer of the Naval Air Station. He instructed both that they had been spot promoted to Colonel and Captain respectively, their garrison would receive his full support and he also let them know that he had intelligence that Midway was going to be attacked by the Japanese at the end of the month. Shortly thereafter, five additional antiaircraft batteries from the 3d Defense Battalion reinforced the island along with two companies from the Marine Corps' 2nd Raider Battalion. Battalion strength had swelled to nearly 1700 personnel by early June 1942. by At 0555 on the morning of 4 June 1942, 6th Defense Battalion's SCR-270 early warning radar picked up a large force of Japanese aircraft approximately ninety miles out and approaching from 320 degrees. Thirty-six Japanese bombers eventually made it to Midway in two waves and were engaged by the guns of the reinforced battalion. Japanese after action reports detail losing three aircraft to antiaircraft fire that morning. The 6th Defense Battalion's battle standard can be seen in the early portions of John Ford's film The Battle of Midway. The film also depicts members of the battalion engaging Japanese aircraft during the battle.

=== Post War & Decommissioning ===
The 6th Defense Battalion remained at Midway for the remainder of World War II. Unlike all of the other defense battalions which were either decommissioned or had their coastal guns removed and were converted to anti-aircraft battalions, the 6th retained its moniker throughout the war. On 1 February 1946 the 6th Defense Battalion was re-designated as Marine Barracks, Naval Air Station Midway. The Marine Barracks was officially decommissioned on 31 October 1949.

== Unit awards ==
A unit citation or commendation is an award bestowed upon an organization for the action cited. Members of the unit who participated in said actions are allowed to wear on their uniforms the awarded unit citation. Marine Barracks, Naval Air Station Midway has been presented with the following awards:

Streamer	Award	Year(s)	Additional Info
A green streamer with red, gold, and blue horizontal stripes along the top and bottom with one silver star in the center	Navy Unit Commendation Streamer	1942	Midway
	Asiatic-Pacific Campaign Streamer		
	World War II Victory Streamer	1941–1945	Pacific War

=== Navy Unit Commendation citation ===
For outstanding heroism in support of military operations prior to and during the Battle of Midway, June 1942. Assuming a tremendous operational and service load in preparing defenses of Midway against anticipated Japanese attack, the officers and men of the Sixth Defense Battalion carried on intensive night battle training, completed and installed underwater obstacles, unloaded and distributed supplies, emplaced guns and constructed facilities for stowing ammunition and for protecting personnel. Alert and ready for combat when enemy planes came in to launch high and dive-bombing attacks and low-level strafing attacks on June 4, they promptly opened and maintained fire against the hostile targets, downing 10 planes during the furious 17-minute action which resulted in the destruction of the Marine galley and mess-hall, equipment, supplies and communication facilities. Working as an effective team for long periods without relief, this Battalion cleared the debris from the bomb-wrecked galley; reestablished disrupted communications, and serviced planes, thereby contributing greatly to the success of operations conducted from this base. This high standards of courage and service maintained by the Sixth Defense Battalion reflect the highest credit upon the United States Naval Service.

== See also ==
- Marine Defense Battalions
- List of United States Marine Corps aviation support units
