= Billy Werber =

American baseball player (1908–2009)

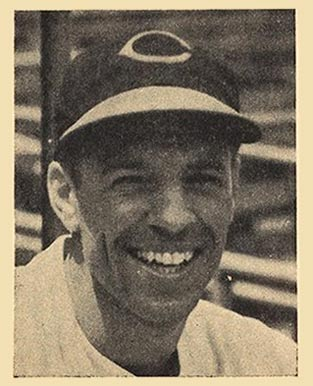
- Third baseman
- Born: June 20, 1908; Berwyn Heights, Maryland, U.S.
- Died: January 22, 2009 (aged 100); Charlotte, North Carolina, U.S.
- Batted: Right Threw: Right

MLB debut
- June 25, 1930, for the New York Yankees

Last MLB appearance
- September 5, 1942, for the New York Giants

MLB statistics
- Batting average: .271
- Home runs: 78
- Runs batted in: 539
- Stats at Baseball Reference

Teams
- New York Yankees (1930, 1933); Boston Red Sox (1933–1936); Philadelphia Athletics (1937–1938); Cincinnati Reds (1939–1941); New York Giants (1942)

Career highlights and awards
- World Series champion (1940); 3× AL stolen base leader (1934, 1935, 1937); Cincinnati Reds Hall of Fame

William Murray Werber (June 20, 1908 – January 22, 2009) was an American professional baseball third baseman in Major League Baseball who played for the New York Yankees (1930, 1933), Boston Red Sox (1933–1936), Philadelphia Athletics (1937–1938), Cincinnati Reds (1939–1941) and New York Giants (1942). He led American League third basemen in putouts and assists once each, and also led National League third basemen in assists, double plays and fielding percentage once each. A strong baserunner, he led the AL in stolen bases three times and led the NL in runs in 1939 as the Reds won the pennant. He was born in Berwyn Heights, Maryland and batted and threw right-handed.

== Biography ==
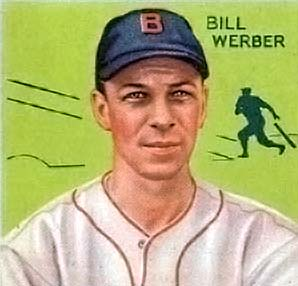
Bill Werber 1934 baseball card

A 5'10", 170-pound infielder, Werber was at spring training and toured for several weeks in July with the Yankees in 1927. He returned to North Carolina to attend school at Duke University, where he was the first Duke basketball player to earn All-America honors and also earned All-America honors in baseball. He was a member of the Sigma Chi fraternity and a recipient of the Significant Sig Award. After the spring season, he briefly played semiprofessionally until 1930 when he officially became a Yankee rookie in 1930. He appeared in only four games that season, and was sent to the minors. In his first professional game, he reached base five times, including his first at bat where, according to Ford Frick, then a sportswriter, and later commissioner of baseball, "Werber, in his first time at bat in big league competition, with two strikes on him, watched the next four balls with the coolness of a veteran." Decades later, Werber enjoyed admitting that he was so frozen by fear that he was unable to move his arms to make a swing at the ball. In 1933, Frankie Crosetti was chosen as the Yankees' shortstop, and with Tony Lazzeri at second base and Joe Sewell on third, Werber was traded to the Boston Red Sox. In that season, he appeared in 108 games with Boston as a utility infielder at shortstop, second, and third base.

In 1934, Werber became the starting third baseman of the Red Sox. He responded with a career-high .321 batting average, including 200 hits; led the American League with 40 stolen bases, and posted double digits in doubles (41), triples (10) and home runs (11). He led the league in stolen bases in 1935 (29) and 1937 (35). Boston traded him to the Philadelphia Athletics for the 1937 season, and he joined the Cincinnati Reds in 1939.

In his first National League season, Werber became the first player ever to bat on television during a game between Cincinnati and the Brooklyn Dodgers at Ebbets Field (August 26, 1939). He ended the season with a .289 average in 147 games and led the league with 115 runs. In the post-season, Cincinnati faced the Yankees in the 1939 World Series and lost in four games. The following season belonged to Werber and the Reds, though, and, although his batting numbers were generally down from 1939, he led the league with a .962 fielding average and finished 10th in voting for the NL's MVP Award. The 1940 World Series was the only Series in a six-year span that the Yankees did not win. Cincinnati beat the Detroit Tigers in seven games as Werber led the Reds with a .370 average (10-for-27). Werber still holds one Major League record, as he is the only player to hit four consecutive doubles in both leagues (with Boston in the A.L. and with the Reds in the N.L.) After that, he played with the New York Giants in 1942, his last major league season.

In an 11-season career, Werber was a .271 hitter with 78 home runs and 539 RBI in 1,295 games. One of the most aggressive baserunners of the 1930s, he stole 215 bases. He was inducted into the Cincinnati Reds Hall of Fame in 1961. Werber was known as a tough competitor who prided himself on working hard and outsmarting his opponents. He once took second base on a walk while noting that the catcher turned to argue the umpire's ball four call.

Werber had a very successful business career following his retirement from baseball. He began selling pension plans, and his work ethic and good communication skills yielded results. He ultimately oversaw the operations of the Werber Insurance Agency, started by his father in 1904. He was a top producer until his retirement in the early 1970s. Billy's son, Bill, married the daughter of US Army Adjutant General, Herbert M. Jones.

He retired to Naples, Florida, but lived in a retirement home in Charlotte, North Carolina until the time of his death.

Werber was a vivid storyteller and would often share tales of playing with Babe Ruth and Lou Gehrig and hunting trips with President Eisenhower and J.W. Marriott, among many others retold in his three authored books: Circling the Bases (1978), Hunting Is for the Birds (1981), and Memories of a Ballplayer (2001).

Prior to his death, Werber said that he no longer watched baseball. One of his stated reasons was that he was dismayed to see Johnny Damon's long hair and beard. In 2008, Werber said, "I don't like the appearance of a lot of the players. The hair's too long. Their beards are too evident. They're a grubby-looking bunch of caterwaulers."

== Death ==
Werber died on January 22, 2009, in a Charlotte, North Carolina assisted living facility, at age 100. At the time of his death, Werber was recognized as the oldest living former player of Major League Baseball. Werber was also the final surviving teammate of Babe Ruth.

== See also ==
- List of Major League Baseball annual runs scored leaders
- List of Major League Baseball annual stolen base leaders
- List of Major League Baseball career stolen bases leaders
- List of centenarians (Major League Baseball players)
- List of centenarians (sportspeople)

== Bibliography ==
- Circling the Bases by Bill Werber (self-published, 1978)
- Hunting Is for the Birds by Bill Werber (self-published, 1981)
- Memories of a Ballplayer: Bill Werber and Baseball in the 1930s by Bill Werber and C. Paul Rogers III (SABR, 2001) ISBN 0-910137-84-6

Records
Preceded by Rollie Stiles	Oldest recognized verified living baseball player July 22, 2007 – January 22, 2009	Succeeded by Tony Malinosky
