= George H. Cannon =

USMC Medal of Honor recipient (1915–1941)

George Ham Cannon
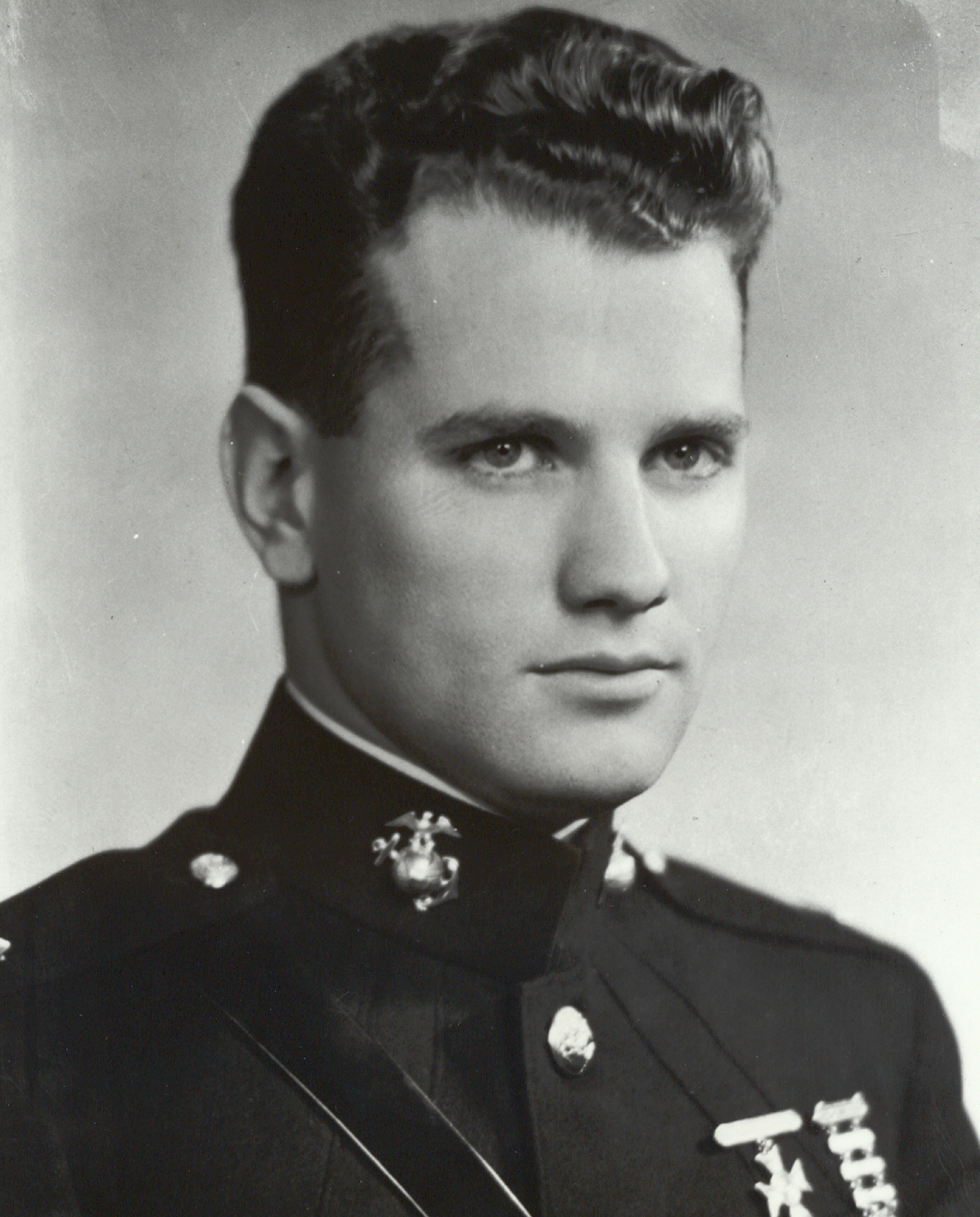
- George H. Cannon, Medal of Honor recipient
- Born: November 5, 1915; Webster Groves, Missouri
- Died: December 7, 1941 (aged 26); Sand Island, Midway Islands
- Burial place: National Memorial Cemetery of the Pacific
- Military career
- Allegiance: United States of America
- Branch: United States Marine Corps
- Service years: 1938–1941
- Rank: First Lieutenant
- Unit: 6th Defense Battalion
- Conflicts: World War II: First Bombardment of Midway †
- Awards: Medal of Honor; Purple Heart Medal

First Lieutenant George Ham Cannon, USMC, (November 5, 1915 – December 7, 1941) was the first United States Marine in World War II to receive the nation's highest military award—the Medal of Honor.

He posthumously received the medal for "distinguished conduct in the line of his profession, extraordinary courage, and disregard of his own condition" during the bombardment of Midway Island by Japanese forces on December 7, 1941. He remained at his command post, despite being mortally wounded by enemy shell fire. He refused to be evacuated until his men who had been wounded by the same shell were evacuated, and he continued to direct the reorganization of his command post until forcibly removed. He refused medical attention until he was assured communications were restored to his command post. As a result of his utter disregard of his own condition, he later died from loss of blood.

== Biography ==
George Ham Cannon was born on November 5, 1915, in Webster Groves, Missouri. He later moved to Detroit, Michigan, where he graduated from Southeastern High School. He also attended the Culver Military Academy in Culver, Indiana, prior to entering the University of Michigan in Ann Arbor. While in attendance at that university he was a member of the Reserve Officers Training Corps, and graduated with a Bachelor of Science degree in Mechanical Engineering in June 1938.

He was commissioned a second lieutenant in the Engineer Reserve, U.S. Army during his last year in the University of Michigan. While at the University of Michigan he became a member of the Sigma Chi fraternity. He resigned his commission in the army upon graduation, in order to accept a commission as second lieutenant in the United States Marine Corps. Commissioned on June 25, 1938, he was ordered to duty on July 5, 1938, at the Philadelphia Navy Yard to await assignment to the next class of Basic School. He began studies on July 18, that year.

His first tour of duty as a U.S. Marine was on board the USS Boise, following the completion of his schooling May 20, 1939. He was assigned to the Post Service Battalion at the Marine Barracks, Quantico, Virginia, on July 10, 1940, and two weeks later entered the Base Defense Weapons Course at the Marine Corps Schools.

Ordered to the Marine Corps Base in San Diego, California, in December 1940, he joined Battery H, 2d Defense Battalion on February 16, 1941. In March 1941, the battery joined the 6th Defense Battalion and in July the unit sailed for Pearl Harbor. In August 1941, he was promoted to first lieutenant with the rank dating back to from June 25, 1941.

On September 7, 1941, 1stLt. Cannon reported to Midway Island as a platoon leader and member of the Battalion Coding Board. He was killed in action on the same day the Japanese drew the United States into World War II, December 7, 1941, during the sneak attack by Japanese forces.

After his burial on Midway, his remains were then removed to Halawa Cemetery in Hawaii, and from there to the Honolulu Memorial Cemetery ("Punchbowl"), where he is permanently interred. Cannon also has a cenotaph in his parents burial plot in Glen Cove Cemetery in Knightstown, Indiana.

== Military awards ==
Cannon received the following military decorations and awards:

Medal of Honor
Purple Heart	Combat Action Ribbon	American Defense Service Medal with one 3/16" bronze star ("Base" Clasp)
American Campaign Medal	Asiatic-Pacific Campaign Medal with one 3/16" bronze star	World War II Victory Medal

== Medal of Honor citation ==
The President of the United States takes pleasure in presenting the Congressional MEDAL OF HONOR posthumously to

FIRST LIEUTENANT GEORGE H. CANNON
UNITED STATES MARINE CORPS

for service during an attack on the United States Fleet in Midway Islands as set forth in the following CITATION:

For distinguished conduct in the line of his profession, extraordinary courage, and disregard of his own condition during the bombardment of Sand Island, Midway Islands, by Japanese forces on December 7, 1941. Lieutenant Cannon, Battery Commander of Battery "H", Sixth Defense Battalion, Fleet Marine Force, U. S. Marine Corps, was at his Command Post when he was mortally wounded by enemy shell fire. He refused to be evacuated from his post until after his men, who had been wounded by the same shell were evacuated, and directed the reorganization of his Command Post until forcibly removed, and as a result of his utter disregard of his own condition he died from loss of blood.

/S/ FRANKLIN D. ROOSEVELT

== Honors ==
- The first school on Midway Island, which was established after World War II, was named the George Cannon School, "in honor of Midway's war hero."
- The USS Cannon was named in honor of 1LT Cannon, sponsored by his mother, Mrs. Estelle Ham Cannon, and launched at the Dravo Corporation, Wilmington, Delaware, on May 25, 1943.
- The Cannon Memorial Recreation Center (closed in 2006) in Detroit was built and named in his honor, as well as a Marine Corps recruiting center in downtown Detroit.
- An annex to Marine Corps Air Station Yuma located a few miles to the southeast is titled the Cannon Air Defense Complex. It was formerly the home of the 2nd Light Antiaircraft Missile Battalion but now houses Marine Air Control Squadron 1 (MACS-1) and Marine Wing Support Squadron 371 (MWSS-371).
- Lieutenant Cannon's Medal of Honor is on display at Culver Military Academy as the centerpiece of an exhibit honoring the five Medal of Honor recipients who are CMA alumni.

== See also ==
- List of Medal of Honor recipients
- List of Medal of Honor recipients for World War II
