= USS Herbert C. Jones =

1943 Edsall-class destroyer escort

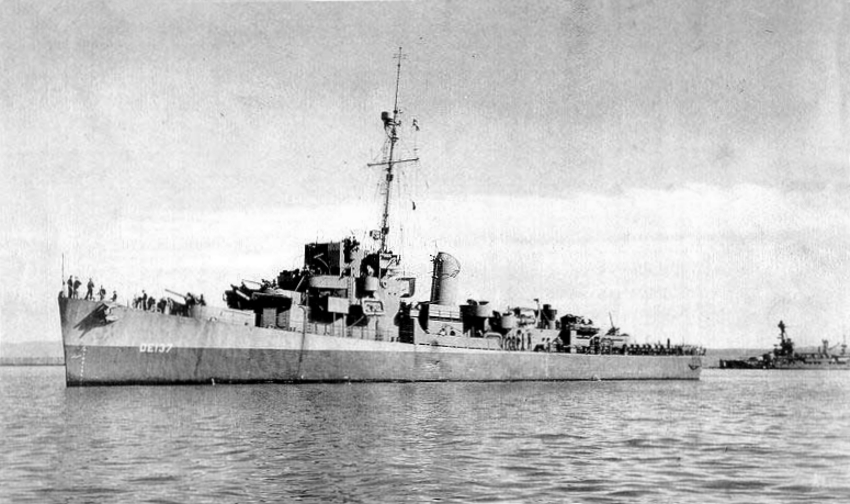

History

United States
- Namesake: Herbert C. Jones
- Builder: Consolidated Steel Corporation, Orange, Texas
- Laid down: 30 November 1942
- Launched: 19 January 1943
- Commissioned: 21 July 1943
- Decommissioned: 2 May 1947
- Stricken: 1 July 1972
- Honours and awards: 3 Battle stars for World War II and Navy Unit Commendation
- Fate: Sold 19 July 1973, scrapped

General characteristics
- Class & type: Edsall-class destroyer escort
- Displacement: 1,253 tons standard; 1,590 tons full load
- Length: 306 feet (93.27 m)
- Beam: 36.58 feet (11.15 m)
- Draft: 10.42 full load feet (3.18 m)
- Propulsion: 4 FM diesel engines, 4 diesel-generators, 6,000 shp (4.5 MW), 2 screws
- Speed: 21 knots (39 km/h)
- Range: 9,100 nmi. at 12 knots; (17,000 km at 22 km/h)
- Complement: 8 officers, 201 enlisted
- Armament: 3 × single 3 in (76 mm)/50 guns; 1 × twin 40 mm AA guns; 8 × single 20 mm AA guns; 1 × triple 21 in (533 mm) torpedo tubes; 8 × depth charge projectors; 1 × depth charge projector (hedgehog); 2 × depth charge tracks

USS Herbert C. Jones (DE-137) was an Edsall-class destroyer escort built for the U.S. Navy during World War II. She served in the Atlantic Ocean and provided destroyer escort protection against submarine and air attack for Navy vessels and convoys.

She was named in honor of Herbert Charpoit Jones, who was awarded the Medal of Honor posthumously for his brave actions during the Japanese attack on Pearl Harbor on 7 December 1941. She was launched 19 January 1943 by the Consolidated Steel Corp., Orange, Texas; sponsored by Mrs. Joanne Ruth Jones, widow; and commissioned 21 July 1943.

== North Atlantic operations ==
After a Caribbean shakedown, Herbert C. Jones reported to the Naval Research Laboratory, Washington, D.C., to participate in experiments on the method of control used by the Nazis in their glider bombs.

== Testing radio-jamming equipment ==
The new destroyer escort departed Norfolk, Virginia, 7 October for the Mediterranean, arriving Algiers via Gibraltar 16 October to begin a year of escort duty along the North African coast. In a German attack 6 November, Herbert C. Jones destroyed one enemy plane. As she escorted a convoy bound from Algiers to Bizerte, Herbert C. Jones distinguished herself in an intensive 2-hour German attack the afternoon of 26 November. In addition to splashing one fighter, the ship studied the performance characteristics of enemy radio-directed glider bombs. As a result of these under-fire investigations, Herbert C. Jones and her sister ship USS Frederick C. Davis were fitted with powerful radio-jamming sets in early December to counteract and misdirect the glider bombs. This new electronic warfare capability was to find almost immediate use as Herbert C. Jones patrolled off the Italian coast 22 January 1944 while Allied troops stormed ashore to establish the Anzio beachhead. With her special gear, Herbert C. Jones jammed and decoyed into the sea the great majority of the many glider bombs directed at the naval task force. She also intercepted radio messages which enabled her to give warning of impending German air attacks. Herbert C. Jones received the Navy Unit Commendation for her work off Anzio.

== Supporting Operation Dragoon ==
The destroyer escort saw her next major action as she arrived off the French coast 16 August, D-day plus one, to support Operation Dragoon, the invasion of southern France. After 2 months of antisubmarine patrol, Herbert C. Jones reached New York 17 October for overhaul and coastal convoy duty.

== End-of-war activity ==
In December 1944 USS Herbert C. Jones joined a hunter-killer task force for antisubmarine patrol in the Atlantic out of Norfolk. Remaining on this duty until V-E Day, Herbert C. Jones sailed for the Pacific 24 June 1945 after training exercises in Cuba. She was at Pearl Harbor when news of the Japanese capitulation was received 15 August, and from there sailed to the Marshall Islands for precautionary air-sea patrol duty.

== Post-war decommissioning ==
Herbert C. Jones sailed to Green Cove Springs, Florida, via San Diego, California, the Panama Canal, and New York City 15 March 1946. She decommissioned and was placed in reserve 2 May 1947. She was berthed at Philadelphia, Pennsylvania, and struck from the Navy list in July 1972. She was sold on 19 July 1973 and scrapped.

== Awards ==
For her participation in World War II, Herbert C. Jones was awarded three battle stars in addition to the Navy Unit Commendation.
