= Aviation ordnanceman =

United States Navy occupational rating

Aviation Ordnanceman
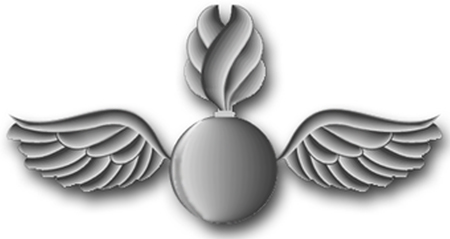
- Rating insignia
- Issued by: United States Navy
- Type: Enlisted rating
- Abbreviation: AO
- Specialty: Aviation

Aviation Ordnanceman (abbreviated as AO) is a United States Navy occupational rating.

== History ==
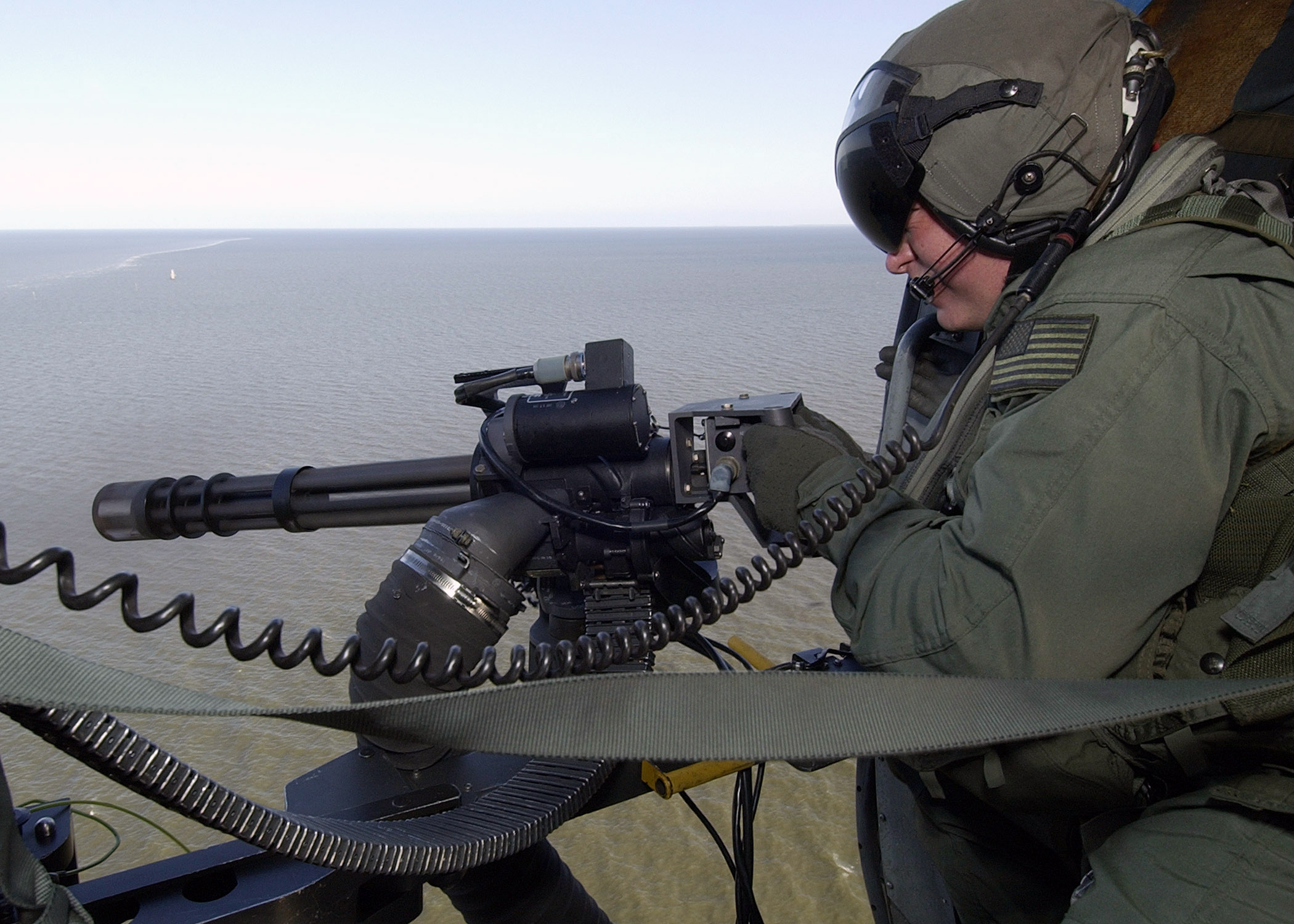
An Aviation Ordnanceman fires a GAU-17 Minigun aboard HH-60H Seahawk helicopter during a live-fire exercise.

Aviation Ordnancemen operate and handle aviation ordnance equipment. They are responsible for the maintenance of guns, bombs, torpedoes, rockets, and missiles. Their duties include the stowing, issuing, and loading of munitions and small arms. There are three different types of ordnanceman; "O" (organizational) level, "I" (intermediate) level, and "D" (depot) level. O-level ordnanceman are attached to squadrons ashore and afloat. They perform loading/downloading operations on aircraft. I-level perform maintenance on bomb racks, missile launchers, and all other aircraft armament components. as well as store, inventory, issue, and assemble all ordnance. Aviation ordnanceman "A" School is currently held at Pensacola Naval Air Station, in Florida, by the Naval Air Technical Training Center. Aviation ordnanceman training is approximately 5 weeks long. At aviation ordnanceman "A" School, subjects are taught basic aviation theory and skills, along with electronic troubleshooting. To become an aviation ordnanceman, one must have color perception and 20/20 vision or have their vision correctable to 20/20. One must also have an ASVAB score of VE+AR+MK+AS=185 or MK+AS+AO=140. While some aviation ordnanceman tasks require a secret security clearance, all ordnancemen must be eligible for the clearance.

Ship's company, who are stationed on board ship and are also "O" level AOs, work in the magazines below decks or on the flight deck of aircraft carriers. They are in charge of inventory of the weapons on the flight deck whether they are loaded on aircraft or stored behind the island. "I" level ordnancemen work in the aviation intermediate maintenance departments on ships at sea or in facilities ashore. They perform such tasks as preventive maintenance, testing of bomb racks, missile launchers, rocket launchers, handling equipment, loading equipment, aircraft guns for issue to squadrons, and perform any repairs needed. Depot "D" level is for equipment that needs to be completely overhauled and is beyond the capabilities of "I" level maintenance. In a 20-year period, an average aviation ordnanceman spends about 60 percent assigned to fleet units and 40 percent to shore stations.

Aviation Ordnancemen are a close-knit community and one of the few ratings in the U.S. Navy to have their own association, the Association of Aviation Ordnancemen. In addition, aviation ordnanceman had come up with an acronym "IYAOYAS" meaning, "If you ain't ordnance, you ain't shit." One of the most notable aviation ordnancemen was Lieutenant John William Finn, who came up as an enlisted sailor making it to the rank of chief petty officer. He was awarded the Medal of Honor for his actions during the attack on Pearl Harbor on December 7, 1941.

== See also ==
- List of United States Navy ratings
