= First Bombardment of Midway =

World War II engagement

Coordinates: 28.206°N 177.379°W

- Part of the Pacific War; World War II
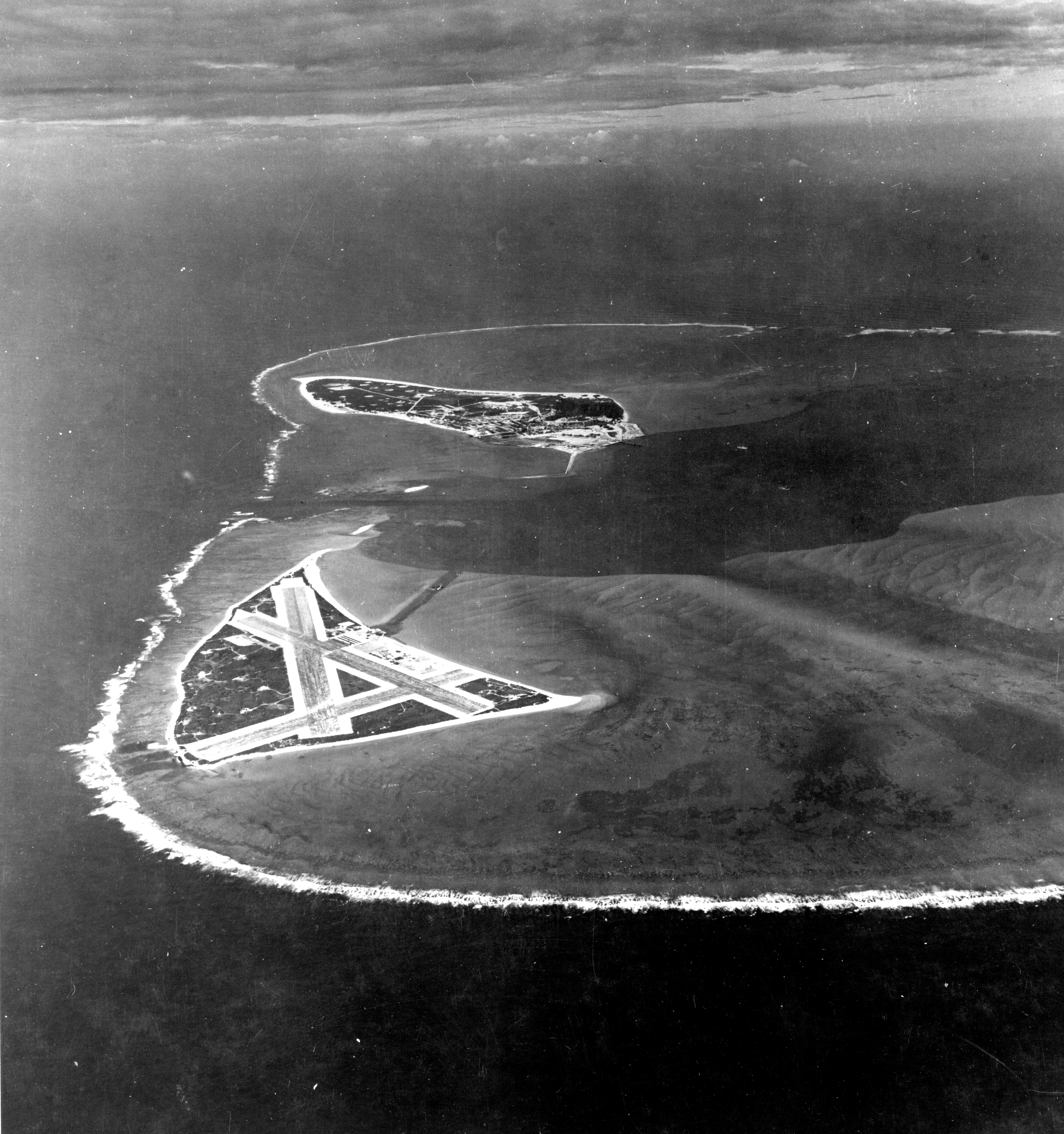
- Midway Atoll on November 24, 1941.
Date	December 7, 1941
Location	Sand Island, Midway Atoll, Hawaiian Archipelago, Pacific Ocean
Result	Midway bombarded; IJN destroyers retire.

Belligerents
United States	Japan

Commanders and leaders
(United States) Lieutenant Colonel Harold D. Shannon (United States) First Lieutenant George H. Cannon †	(Empire of Japan) Captain Kaname Konishi

Strength
Land: unknown marines, unknown sailors, unknown shore batteries Air: unknown aircraft	2 destroyers

Casualties and losses
4 killed, 10 wounded, 1 aircraft destroyed, Midway base damaged	1 destroyer damaged; light casualties

The First Bombardment of Midway, or the First Bombardment of Sand Island, or Attack on Midway, was a small land and sea engagement of World War II. It occurred on the very first day of the Pacific War, 7 December 1941, not long after the major attack on Pearl Harbor. Two Imperial Japanese destroyers bombarded Sand Island of Midway Atoll. The Japanese successfully damaged the U.S. Marine base before being engaged by American shore batteries and forced to flee.

== Background ==
Before the beginning of the Pacific War, American marines were stationed on Midway and had established a small base with the ability to service land, sea and air forces. The marines also constructed all of the bases' fortifications; civilian contractors constructed the buildings. They used 5 inch (127 mm) guns, built in 1916, and 3 inch (76 mm) guns of 1921 to defend the islands. Fortifications had been manned since 1905. Not only were Pearl Harbor, Wake Island, Guam and the Philippines attacked in the opening phase of the conflict, but Midway was shelled as well by two Japanese destroyers, Ushio and Sazanami.

== Bombardment ==
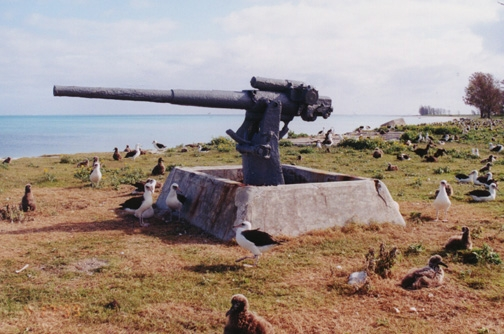
A shore gun on Sand Island.

The two destroyers were part of the Japanese fleet that had just attacked Pearl Harbor. Overall, the unit was under the command of Captain Kaname Konishi, though Lieutenant Commander Yoshitake Uesugi skippered Ushio and Lieutenant Commander Hiroshi Uwai skippered the other destroyer. The engagement began at 09:31 and lasted 54 minutes. The American command, communications and power plant building was damaged by a 5 in (130 mm) shell, which deflected off an adjacent laundromat. Battery "H" commander—First Lieutenant George H. Cannon—was hit by shrapnel in the pelvis while inside the command building. By this time, the communications were down from enemy fire, so Lieutenant Cannon refused medical attention until he was assured that the communications were restored to the post and the wounded marines around him were evacuated.

By the time Cannon received aid from a medic, it was too late; he perished due to blood loss. For Cannon's "distinguished conduct in the line of his profession, extraordinary courage, and disregard of his own condition", he received the first Medal of Honor issued to a U.S. Marine for actions in the Second World War. A street on Sand Island was named after Cannon and continues to be known by that name, a 1943 destroyer escort—USS Cannon (DE-99)—was also named after him. Six Japanese rounds struck and entered the main PBY Catalina hangar and destroyed a PBY inside; the Pilot and Fireman were killed (see next paragraph), while other civilians inside survived without injury. The hospital was hit also and burned. All of the damaged buildings were quickly rebuilt by the civilian contractors.

Shell craters littered the ground all around the buildings of Sand Island. The Marines did not use aircraft against the attacking Japanese. They did use their artillery batteries and managed to damage one of the destroyers when they came within range. The other destroyer quickly laid a smokescreen and the two vessels retired. Four men died on Midway that morning: Navy Ensign Donald J. Kraker and Fireman Second Class Ralph E. Tuttle and Marines Lieutenant Cannon and Private First Class Elmer R. Morrell. Several others were injured. Navy Chief mechanics engineer John J. Szajkowski survived with another sailor by jumping in the water when they saw the planes coming for the hangar. Japanese casualties are unknown. Ushio fired 109 rounds and Sazanami fired 193.

== Aftermath ==
This was mentioned in the Infamy speech with the lines "Yesterday the Japanese Government also launched an attack against Malaya. Last night Japanese forces attacked Hong Kong. Last night Japanese forces attacked Guam. Last night Japanese forces attacked the Philippine Islands. Last night the Japanese attacked Wake Island. And this morning the Japanese attacked Midway Island." .

In February 1942, a Japanese submarine bombarded the atoll. In June 1942, the Battle of Midway was won by American forces. The Marines by that time had received reinforcements, both personnel and some newer and bigger guns, all of which were used by the Marine garrison when they engaged attacking Japanese A6M2 Zeros in June 1942.

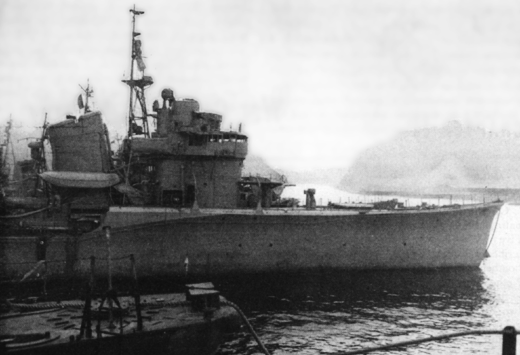
Ushio from the side.

== See also ==
- Attacks on the United States
- Infamy Speech
- Niihau incident
- Bombardment of Howland Island
- Battle of Wake Island
