= Herbert M. Jones =

U.S. Army major general

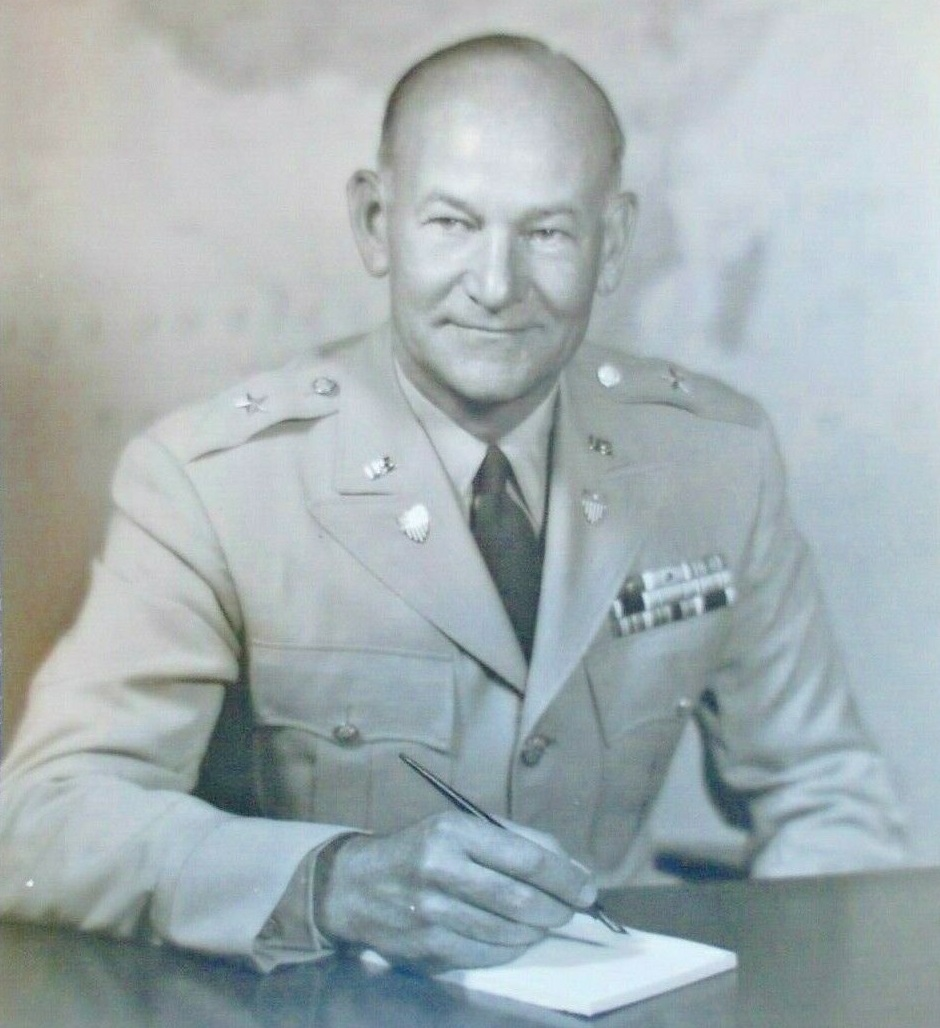
Jones as a brigadier general in 1953

Herbert Maury Jones (11 October 1898 – 22 December 1990) was an American military officer who was Adjutant General of Supreme Headquarters Allied Powers Europe and Adjutant General of the U.S. Army. He held the rank of major general.

== Biography ==
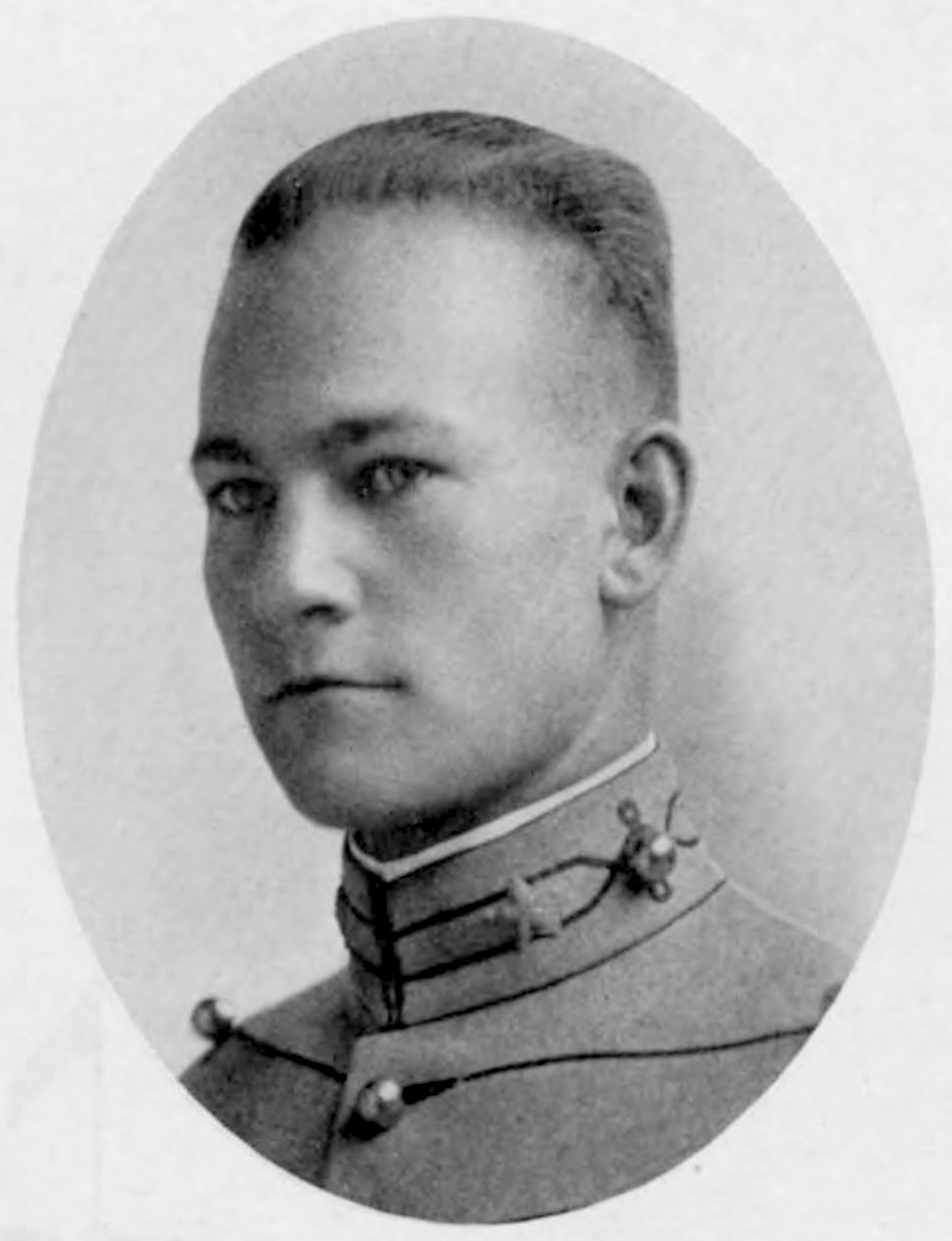
As a West Point cadet

General Herbert M. Jones was a native of Washington, D.C. and a graduate of Central High School. He graduated from the U.S. Military Academy at West Point in 1919 and was assigned to field artillery en route to tours of duty in France, Belgium, Italy, and Germany.

During the 1920s and 1930s, he served at various posts in the United States and Panama, including West Point, where he was an assistant professor of physics, and Fort Sill, Oklahoma, where he was a field artillery instructor.

During World War II, he served in the Pacific as adjutant general of the 3rd Air Force and later as chief of staff of the Espirito Santo Island Command and the Okinawa Base Island Command.

Postwar, he played a role in the formation of the Supreme Headquarters Allied Powers Europe (SHAPE), for which he later was adjutant general.

He served as adjutant general of the U.S. Army from 1 January 1957 to 31 October 1958.

He retired from the Army in 1958. His military decorations included a Legion of Merit with Oak Leaf Cluster and a Distinguished Service Medal. He was appointed to the Army Advisory Board of Directors in 1964.

In 1989, he moved to the Knollwood Retirement Community in Washington, formerly the Army Distaff Hall, and was its first male resident. He died at his daughter's home in Rockville, Maryland on 22 December 1990 and is buried at Arlington National Cemetery.

General Jones married Anabel Hunter in 1925 and had one daughter, Ailcey Jones Werber, who married William W. Werber, son of MLB player Billy Werber.
