= USS Cannon =

Cannon-class destroyer escort

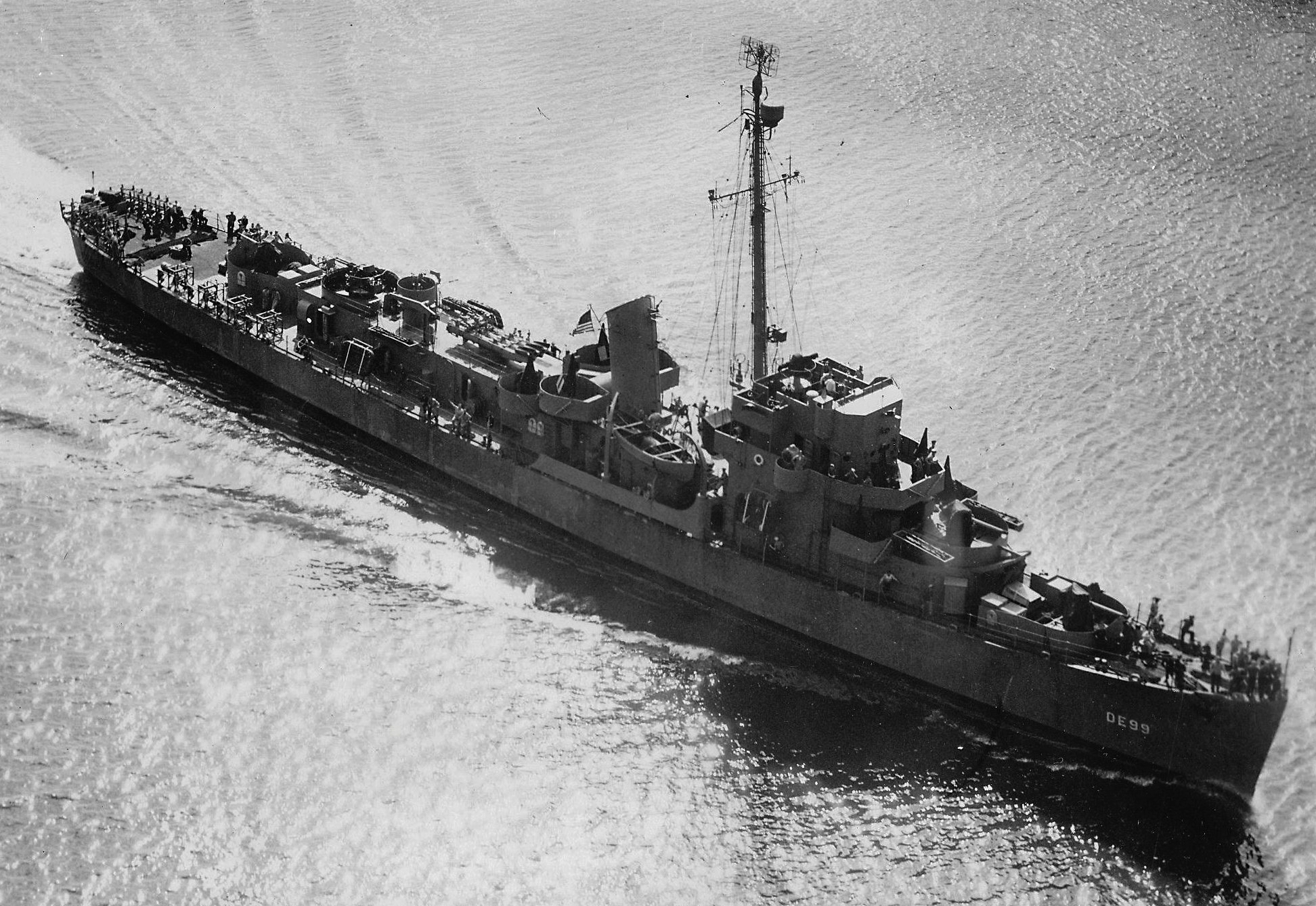
- USS Cannon (DE-99) on 5 September 1943

History

United States
- Name: USS Cannon (DE-99)
- Namesake: George H. Cannon
- Builder: Dravo Corporation, Wilmington, Delaware
- Launched: 25 May 1943
- Commissioned: 26 September 1943
- Decommissioned: 19 December 1944
- Stricken: 20 July 1953
- Fate: Transferred to Brazil

History

Brazil
- Name: Baependi
- Acquired: 19 December 1944
- Out of service: 1975

General characteristics
- Class & type: Cannon-class destroyer escort
- Displacement: 1,240 long tons (1,260 t)
- Length: 306 ft (93 m)
- Beam: 36 ft 8 in (11.18 m)
- Draft: 8 ft 9 in (2.67 m)
- Speed: 21 kn (39 km/h; 24 mph)
- Complement: 186
- Armament: 3 × 3 in (76 mm)/50 guns (3×1); 2 × 40 mm Bofors AA guns (1x2); 8 × 20 mm Oerlikon AA guns (8×1); 3 × Torpedo tubes for 21-inch Mark 15 torpedo (1×3); 8 × depth charge projectors; 1 × Hedgehog anti-submarine mortar; 2 x depth charge tracks

USS Cannon (DE-99) was a destroyer escort launched on 25 May 1943 by the Dravo Corporation in Wilmington, Delaware and was sponsored by Mrs. E. H. Cannon. Cannon was commissioned on 26 September 1943 and reported to the United States Atlantic Fleet. The ship was named in honor of George H. Cannon, a Medal of Honor recipient.

== Service history ==
On 30 November 1943, Cannon cleared Philadelphia for Trinidad, where she arrived on 5 December to begin a year of duty escorting convoys from that oil rich island to Recife and Rio de Janeiro, Brazil. During this time, she made one voyage from Brazil to Gibraltar, guarding convoys whose tankers carried the fuel essential to the operations in the Mediterranean.

Cannon's protection of the Allied fuel supply through the sea lanes of the Caribbean and the Atlantic Narrows ended on 4 December 1944, when she arrived at Natal, Brazil to begin training a Brazilian crew in the operation of the ship. Cannon was decommissioned and transferred to Brazil on 19 December 1944 at Natal. She continued to serve in the Brazilian Navy as Baependi until 1975.

== Awards ==

American Campaign Medal	World War II Victory Medal
