= Bert Jones (rugby union, born 1918) =

England international rugby union player

- Full name: Herbert Arthur Jones
- Born: 22 August 1918 Landkey, Devon, England
- Died: 5 December 1998 (aged 80) North Devon, England

Rugby union career
- Position: Lock
International career
Years	Team	Apps	(Points)
1950	England	3	(0)

Herbert Arthur Jones (22 August 1918 - 5 December 1998) was an English international rugby union player.

A farmer from Landkey, Devon, Jones made three appearances for England as a lock in the 1950 Five Nations Championship, debuting against Wales at Twickenham. He purportedly lost his place in the side for the final fixture against Scotland due to a fight he had with the French forwards in the match at Colombes.

Jones captained the combined Devon and Cornwall team against the touring 1951–52 Springboks.

== See also ==
- List of England national rugby union players
