= Herbert W. Jones =

African-American physicist

Herbert Whittier Jones
- Born: 31 January 1927; Chicago, Illinois
- Died: 2 October 2002 (aged 75)
- Education: University of Illinois Urbana-Champaign; University of Michigan
- Scientific career
- Workplaces: Florida A&M University
- Thesis: [ProQuest 301845396 A Method of Obtaining and Analyzing Time-Resolved Intensity Patterns of the Radiation from Various Regions of a Vacuum Spark Discharge] (1960)
- Doctoral advisor: W. Wallace McCormick
- Other academic advisors: Charles L. Dolph; Ralph A. Sawyer; Marcellus Lee Wiedenbeck; Ralph A. Wolfe

Herbert Whittier Jones (31 January 1927 - 2 October 2002) was an American physicist and longtime professor at Florida A&M University. He was known for his research in developing methods for the evaluation of overlap and Coulomb integrals over Slater-type orbitals (STOs) for molecular calculations. He is credited as a founder of the Florida A&M University physics department.

== Early life and education ==
Jones was born in 1927 in Chicago, Illinois, to John and Ada V. Jones. He served in the Navy during World War II.

He received his bachelor's degree in 1949 from the College of Liberal Arts and Sciences at the University of Illinois Urbana-Champaign, and graduated with honors in the physical sciences. He then completed his graduate studies at the Horace H. Rackham School of Graduate Studies at the University of Michigan, graduating with a master's degree in physics in 1950 and a PhD in physics in 1959. His thesis was titled "A Method of Obtaining and Analyzing Time-Resolved Intensity Patterns of the Radiation from Various Regions of a Vacuum Spark Discharge." His doctoral committee included W. Wallace McCormick, Charles L. Dolph, Ralph A. Sawyer, Marcellus Lee Wiedenbeck, and Ralph A. Wolfe.

At the University of Michigan, he was a member of the Sigma Xi honor society, Phi Beta Kappa, and the Alpha Phi Alpha fraternity.

== Career ==
Jones was a professor of physics at Florida A&M University for 43 years, and served as chair of the physics department for 12 years. In 1976, he was also the head of the university's Division of Natural Sciences and Mathematics.

During his time at Florida A&M University, Jones led the Molecular Physics Project along with Charles Weatherford and Babu L. Jain. The project was supported by multiple NASA grants. From August 3-6, 1981, Jones and Weatherford hosted the first International Conference on ETO Multicenter Molecular Integrals in Tallahassee, Florida. The conference was sponsored by Florida A&M University's Institute for Molecular Computations and physics department, and involved 34 scientists from eight different countries. The proceedings were compiled into a 1981 book, "ETO Multicenter Molecular Integrals."

In 1982, Jones spent a sabbatical period with the Quantum Theory Group at the University of Uppsala in Uppsala, Sweden.

== Research ==
Jones "contributed greatly to the solution of the STO integral problem." He based his work on the Löwdin alpha functions, and with Charles Weatherford, made considerable progress in the development of the so-called C-matrix with all integer elements. His later research involved building a detector for magnetic monopoles.

Between 1976 and 1995, with a grant from the U.S. Air Force, Jones developed a computer program in Fortran language to implement Slater-type orbital calculations digitally.

== Publications ==
- Bouferguene, Ahmed; Weatherford, Charles A.; Jones, Herbert W. (February 1999). "Addition theorem of Slater-type orbitals: Application to H 2 + in a strong magnetic field". Physical Review E. 59 (2): 2412–2423. Bibcode:1999PhRvE..59.2412B. doi:10.1103/PhysRevE.59.2412.
- Jones, Herbert W.; Weatherford, Charles A. (September 1989). "The löwdin α function and its application to the multi-center molecular integral problem over slater-type orbitals". Journal of Molecular Structure. 199: 233–243. doi:10.1016/0166-1280(89)80055-7.

== Awards and legacy ==
In 2000, Jones was awarded the National Millennium Award for Research by the White House Initiative on Historically Black Colleges. Ronald E. Mickens was Jones' fellow honoree for this award.

The Herbert W. Jones Endowed Scholarships at Florida A&M University are named for Jones and are awarded to undergraduate students in the college of science and technology. In 2002, FAMU began hosting the annual Herbert W. Jones Memorial Seminar.

== Personal life ==
Jones was married to Gladys Hurt Jones, who he met at the University of Michigan. They had one daughter.
