= Herbert C. Jones =

US Navy Medal of Honor recipient (1918–1941)

Herbert Charpiot Jones
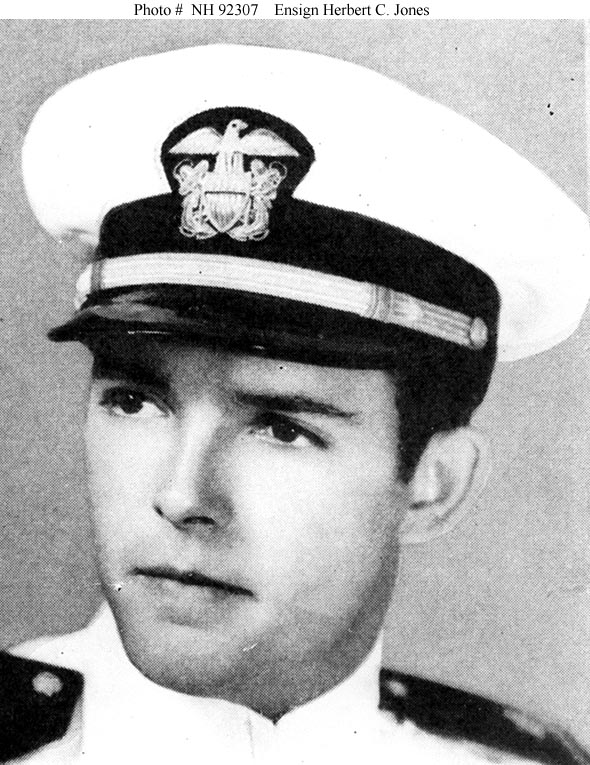
- Ensign Herbert Charpiot Jones
- Born: January 21, 1918; Los Angeles, California
- Died: December 7, 1941 (aged 23); Pearl Harbor, Territory of Hawaii
- Burial place: Fort Rosecrans National Cemetery, San Diego, California
- Military career
- Allegiance: United States of America
- Branch: United States Navy
- Service years: 1935 – 1941
- Rank: Ensign
- Unit: USS California (BB-44)
- Conflicts: World War II: Attack on Pearl Harbor †
- Awards: Medal of Honor

Herbert Charpiot Jones (January 21, 1918 – December 7, 1941) was an officer in the United States Navy who was posthumously awarded the Medal of Honor for his actions during the attack on Pearl Harbor.

== Biography ==
Herbert Jones was born on January 21, 1918, at Los Angeles, California and enlisted in the United States Naval Reserve May 14, 1935. He was commissioned an ensign on November 14, 1940, and reported to the battleship USS California (BB-44) at Pearl Harbor two weeks later.

On December 7, 1941, the 23-year-old ensign was about to relieve the officer-of-the-deck on California when Japanese planes swooped in to attack. In the first wave, a torpedo and a bomb hit the ship. Jones dove into a smoke-filled hatchway and crawled along oil-slicked decks to rescue a stricken sailor before being temporarily overcome by fumes. Reviving, he saw an anti-aircraft battery without a leader and, staggering to his feet, took command. As a second wave of Japanese planes came in, the young officer fired his guns until all their ammunition was expended. Since the torpedo had put California's ammunition hoist out of action, Jones quickly organized a party of volunteers to go below and pass the ammunition up by hand. The vitally needed shells had just begun to reach the battery when a bomb hit the ship and mortally wounded him.

== Medal of Honor citation ==
For conspicuous devotion to duty, extraordinary courage, and complete disregard of his own life, above and beyond the call of duty, during the attack on the Fleet in Pearl Harbor, by Japanese forces on 7 December 1941. Ens. Jones organized and led a party, which was supplying ammunition to the antiaircraft battery of the U.S.S. California after the mechanical hoists were put out of action when he was fatally wounded by a bomb explosion. When 2 men attempted to take him from the area which was on fire, he refused to let them do so, saying in words to the effect, "Leave me alone! I am done for. Get out of here before the magazines go off."

== Awards and decorations ==

1st row	Medal of Honor		Purple Heart
2nd row	Combat Action Ribbon	Navy Good Conduct Medal	American Defense Service Medal with fleet clasp
3rd row	American Campaign Medal	Asiatic-Pacific Campaign Medal with one campaign star	World War II Victory Medal

=== Namesake ===
USS Herbert C. Jones (DE-137) was named in his honor. The ship was launched January 19, 1943, by the Consolidated Steel Corporation, Orange, Texas; sponsored by Mrs. Joanne Ruth Jones, his widow; and commissioned on July 21, 1943, Lieutenant Commander Alfred W. Gardes, Jr. in command.

== See also ==
- List of Medal of Honor recipients
- List of Medal of Honor recipients for World War II
