= Marine defense battalions =

U.S. Marine Corps WWII-era coastal defense battalions

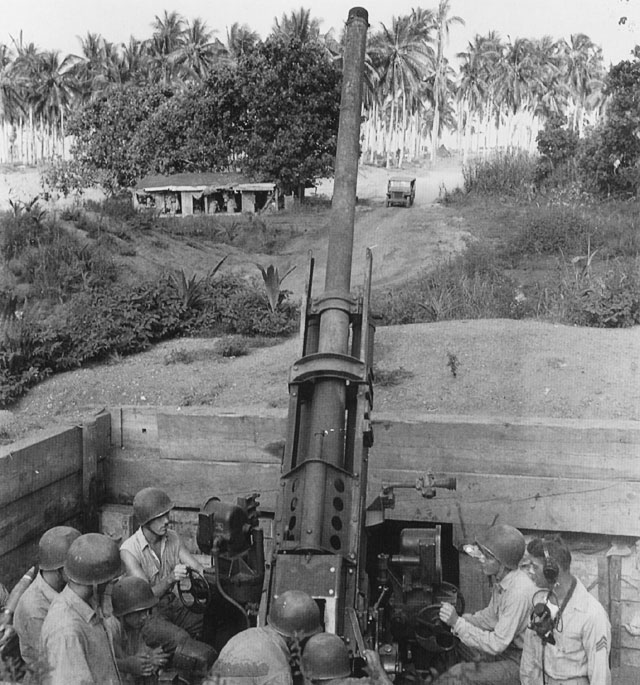
3rd Defense Battalion with a 90 mm antiaircraft gun at Guadalcanal

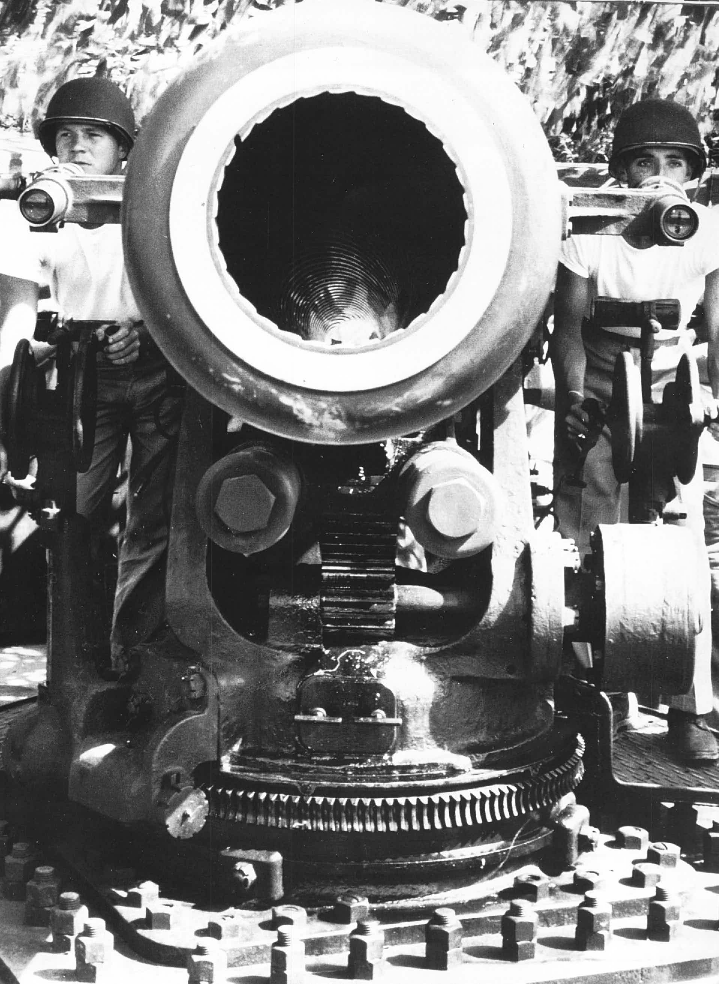
A Marine Defense Battalion with a 5"/51 caliber gun for coast defense at Guantanamo Bay, Cuba

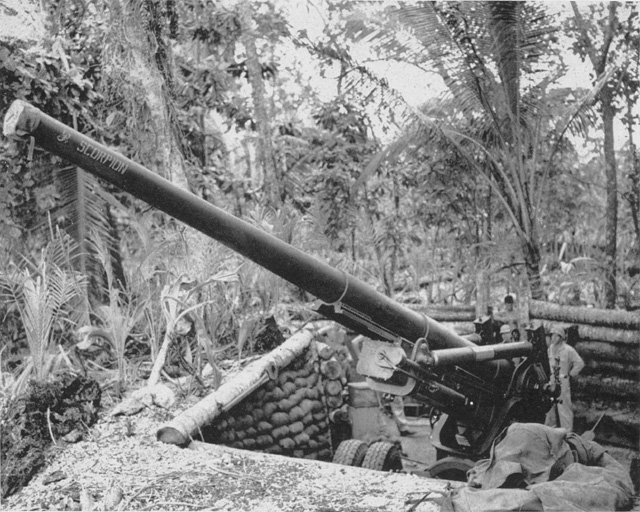
155 mm Long Tom gun "Scorpion" of the 4th Marine Defense Battalion at Barakoma Airfield on Vella Lavella in the South Pacific.

Marine Defense Battalions were United States Marine Corps battalions charged with coastal and air defense of advanced naval bases during World War II. They maintained large anti-ship guns, anti-aircraft guns, searchlights, and small arms to repel landing forces.

== Organization ==
Unlike the mobile Marine forces involved in offensive actions, defense battalions were detached to key outposts, in the Pacific and one in Iceland, and remained at the station they defended. Most varied greatly in size and equipment. The battalions often had several coastal gun batteries, several anti-aircraft batteries, a detection battery (searchlights and radar), and machine gun units. While a few had composite infantry companies attached, most defense battalions were responsible for providing their own riflemen.

A 1939 table of organization and equipment (TOE) included:

- HQ Company
- Service battery
  - Six platoons, each with a searchlight and aircraft sound locator
- Coast Defense Group
  - Three batteries, each with two Mark 15 5"/51 caliber guns
- Antiaircraft Group
  - Four AAA gun batteries, each with four mobile 3-inch M3 guns
  - Two AAA machine gun companies, each with 24 Browning M2 .50-caliber machine guns on AA mounts
  - Two beach protection machine gun companies, each with 24 Browning M1917A1 water-cooled .30-caliber machine guns

It is likely that the 5"/51 caliber guns were replaced by the 155 mm Long Tom and the 3-inch guns were replaced by the 90 mm Gun M1/M2/M3 by early 1943.

== History ==
The defense battalions were first conceived from the fixed defense concept during the Marine Corps's, as well the United States Navy's, critical change in their traditional sea service role to a more "aggressive" amphibious landing force. They conducted "fixed" defense exercises on Culebra Island of Puerto Rico throughout the first half of the 20th century, and other areas around the Caribbean.

The first battalions were created in 1939, when the outbreak of World War II caused concerns that overseas bases might be attacked by the Imperial Japanese Navy.

Colonel Harry K. Pickett's 3rd Defense Battalion occupied Midway Island on 29 September 1940. In February 1941, the 4th Defense Battalion, under Colonel Jesse L. Perkins, landed on Guantanamo Bay, Cuba.

In July 1941 the Colonel Lloyd L. Leech's 5th Marine Defense Battalion landed in Iceland as part of the 1st Provisional Marine Brigade alongside the 6th Marine Regiment and other elements of the 2nd Marine Division, augmenting British forces until they departed in September. The battalion had left its Coast Defense Group behind and exchanged the aircraft sound locators for SCR-268 radar sets. In March 1942 the battalion was relieved by the Army's 61st Coast Artillery Regiment. After the attack on Pearl Harbor, where defenders shot down three planes on 7 December 1941, the battalions grew rapidly.

On 8 December, the Japanese began an assault on Wake Island, and the defenders, including 399 Marines of the 1st Defense Battalion, surrendered after a prolonged battle on 23 December.

Defense battalions deployed early and often throughout the Pacific campaigns, serving in a succession of distant places, some dangerous, others boring. They did not benefit from post-battle rest— though few rest areas lived up to their name —nor were their accommodations comparable to those of an aircraft wing sharing the same location. The Marines of the defense battalions endured isolation, sickness, monotonous food, and primitive living conditions for long periods, as they engaged in the onerous task of protecting advance bases in areas that by no stretch of the imagination resembled tropical paradises. After putting up with these conditions for months [or years], many of these same Marines went on to serve as replacements in the six Marine divisions in action when the war ended.

— From Condition Red: Marine Defense Battalions in World War II by Major Charles D. Melson USMC (Ret), the Marine Corps' official history of the defense battalions.

The year 1942 became a period of defense for the Pacific Theater, and as such, the Marine defense battalions saw much reinforcement, redeployment, and growth. On 4 June, the Marines at Midway Island fended off a Japanese aerial attack, which contributed to the victory of the naval battle hundreds of miles away.

On 7 August, the 3rd Defense Battalion went ashore with the infantry to Guadalcanal and defended the island (and others in the Solomon Islands) against Japanese counterattacks during the Battle of Guadalcanal.

In the summer of 1943, elements of the 9th, 10th, and 11th Defense Battalions supported the Army's XIV Corps in the central Solomons campaign. Other battalions helped clear the northern islands, including Bougainville, and by the spring of 1944, they were all taken.

In early 1944, the Marshall Islands became the next target in the Pacific, and the Marine defenders moved in. By summer, they landed in the Mariana Islands, including Saipan, and Guam. During that time, Commandant of the Marine Corps Lt. Gen. Alexander Vandegrift began to scale back on defense battalions. Two were disbanded, and the remaining began to gradually focus on anti-aircraft defense, rather than coastal defense. Only the 6th, the 51st, and the 52nd remained designated as defense battalions; the rest had become anti-aircraft units under Fleet Marine Force, Pacific.

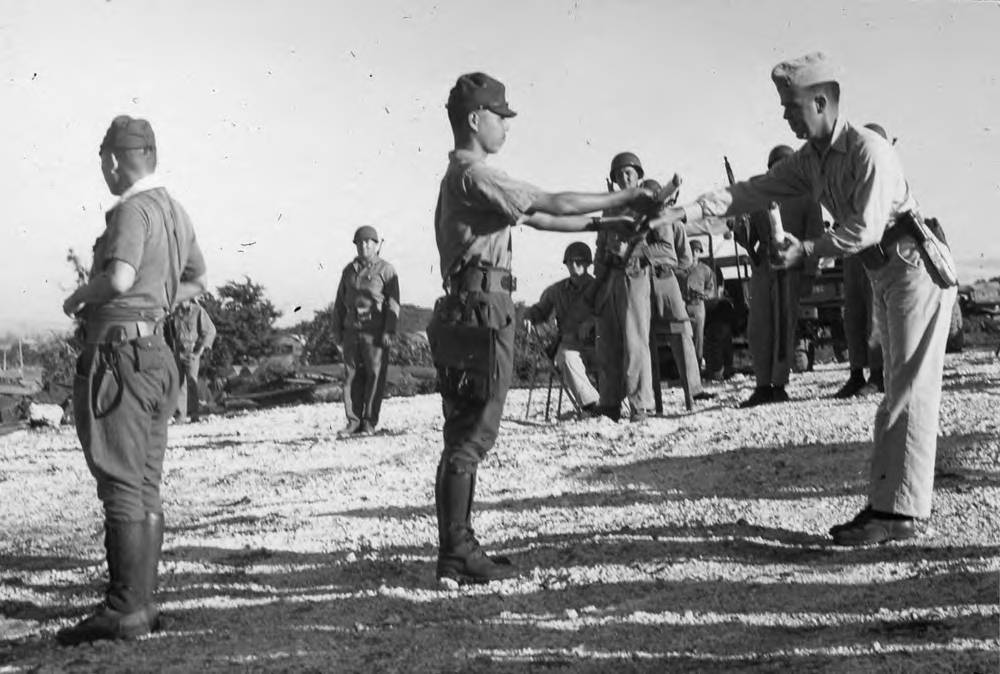
Japanese Imperial Army Captain Sakee Oba surrenders his Samurai sword to Lieutenant Colonel Howard G. Kurgis, USMC, at Saipan, Mariana Islands on Saturday morning, December 1, 1945.

In late 1944, the 2nd, 5th, 8th, and 16th Antiaircraft Artillery (formerly Defense) Battalions formed the 1st Provisional Antiaircraft Artillery Group in preparation to invade the Japanese Home Islands. These battalions did not participate in the Battle of Iwo Jima, however they did land on Okinawa in April 1945. For the Battle of Okinawa the 1st Provisional Antiaircraft Group was tasked with providing antiaircraft defenses for Yontan Airfield and the III Marine Amphibious Corps beaches in the Yontan Area, Southern Okinawa. The Japanese surrender in August 1945 led to a dramatic downsizing in the Marine Corps' Air Defense units.

The 52d Defense Battalion was the last defense battalion in the Marine Corps. It was redesignated as the 3d Antiaircraft Artillery Battalion (Composite) on May 15, 1946.

Marine defense battalions were seen as an ideal unit type for creating and deploying African American units with white leadership, since they trained independently and fought in isolated areas. Those recruits slated for defense battalions were trained at the then-segregated Montford Point, North Carolina (now known as Camp Gilbert H. Johnson, part of the Marine Corps Base Camp Lejeune complex). They would then be assigned to the two black defense battalions, the 51st and 52nd.

== List of battalions ==
Insignia	Battalion Name	Nickname	Location(s)	Notable Commanding Officers
	1st Defense Battalion	Wake Island Defenders	Pearl Harbor, Hawaii; Wake Island; Johnston Island; Palmyra Island; Marshall Islands; Mariana Islands; Guam	Bertram A. Bone; Augustus W. Cockrell; John H. Griebel; Lewis A. Hohn
	2nd Defense Battalion		Hawaii; American Samoa; Tarawa; Guam; Okinawa	Bertram A. Bone; Thomas E. Bourke; Charles I. Murray; Raymond E. Knapp
	3rd Defense Battalion		Pearl Harbor, Hawaii; Midway Island; Guadalcanal; Tulagi; Bougainville	Robert H. Pepper; Harry K. Pickett; Harold C. Roberts; Kenneth W. Benner; Edward H. Forney
	4th Defense Battalion		Guantanamo Bay, Cuba; Pearl Harbor, Hawaii; Midway Island; New Hebrides Islands; New Zealand; Guadalcanal; Vella Lavella; Peleliu; Okinawa	George F. Good Jr. William H. Rupertus; Harold S. Fassett
	5th Defense Battalion		Iceland; New Caledonia; Tulagi; Ellice Islands; Hawaii; Okinawa	Lloyd L. Leech; George F. Good Jr.
	6th Defense Battalion		Hawaii; Midway Island	Charles I. Murray; Raphael Griffin; Harold D. Shannon; Lewis A. Hohn
	7th Defense Battalion		American Samoa; Upolu; Ellice Islands; Peleliu; Hawaii	Lester A. Dessez; Henry R. Paige
	8th Defense Battalion		American Samoa; Wallis Islands; Gilbert Islands; Hawaii; Okinawa	Clyde H. Hartsel; Lloyd L. Leech
	9th Defense Battalion	Fighting Ninth	Guantanamo Bay, Cuba; Guadalcanal; New Georgia; Arundel Island; Guam	David R. Nimmer; William J. Scheyer; Archie E. O'Neil
	10th Defense Battalion		Russell Islands; New Georgia; Arundel Island; Marshall Islands	Robert Blake; Wallace O. Thompson
	11th Defense Battalion		New Hebrides; Guadalcanal; Russell Islands; New Georgia; Arundel Island; Guadalcanal	Charles N. Muldrow
	12th Defense Battalion		Woodlark Island; New Britain; Russell Islands; Peleliu	William H. Harrison; Merlyn D. Holmes
	13th Defense Battalion		Guantanamo Bay, Cuba; Hawaii	Richard M. Cutts Jr.
	14th Defense Battalion	Five: Fourteenth	Tulagi; St. Matthias Islands; Guadalcanal; Guam	Jesse L. Perkins; Galen M. Sturgis
	15th Defense Battalion	First: Fifteenth	Marshall Islands; Mariana Islands	Francis B. Loomis Jr. Peter J. Negri
	16th Defense Battalion		Johnston Island; Hawaii; Tinian; Okinawa	Richard P. Ross Jr. Galen M. Sturgis
	17th Defense Battalion	Two: Seventeen	Saipan; Tinian	Thomas G. McFarland
	18th Defense Battalion		Saipan; Tinian	Harold C. Roberts; William J. Van Ryzin
	51st Defense Battalion		Ellice Islands	William B. Onley; Floyd A. Stephenson
	52nd Defense Battalion		Mariana Islands; Guam	Augustus W. Cockrell; Joseph W. Earnshaw

== See also ==
- Organization of the United States Marine Corps
- List of United States Marine Corps battalions
- History of ground based air defense in the United States Marine Corps
