= History of ground based air defense in the United States Marine Corps =

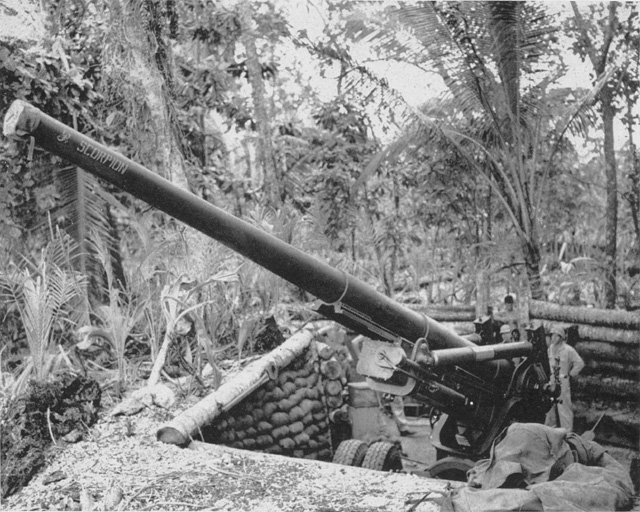
155 mm Long Tom gun "Scorpion" of the 4th Marine Defense Battalion at Barakoma Airfield on Vella Lavella in the South Pacific.

The History of ground based air defense in the United States Marine Corps dates back to the early 1930s with the establishment of the Advanced Base Force. World War II would be the high-water mark for air defense units when 20+ defense/anti-aircraft battalions were formed with many seeing significant action throughout the Pacific Theater. Following the war, the Marine Corps divested itself of most of its air defense capability at a time when the service was facing deep personnel cuts and fighting for its institutional survival. Beginning in the early 1950s the Marine Corps aligned itself with the Navy and their development of surface-to-air missiles (SAMs). The Marine Corps retained both flak weapons and SAMs throughout the 1950s until the fielding of the MIM-23 Hawk Missile System in 1960. The HAWK Missile was employed by Light Antiaircraft Missile (LAAM) battalions and remained a mainstay of Marine Corps ground based air defense for the next four decades.

Beginning in the mid-1950s the Marine Corps also teamed up with the United States Army to develop a Man-portable air-defense system (MANPAD) for more expeditionary operations. This led to the development and fielding of the FIM-43 Redeye in the mid-1960s and its successor, the FIM-92 Stinger. MANPAD systems were originally utilized by Forward Area Air Defense (FAAD) units until the Low Altitude Air Defense (LAAD) battalions were formed in the early 1980s. Following the Cold War, the Marine Corps divested itself of its medium air defense capability with the deactivation of the HAWK Missile battalions. Since the late 1990s the Marine Corps has retained a small air defense capability with its LAAD Battalions which utilize the Stinger Missile. With the recent proliferation of unmanned aerial vehicles and Cruise missiles on the battlefield it appears that air defense in the Marine Corps is set to grow again as leadership explores Directed-energy weapons, electronic warfare and other new technologies to counter emerging threats.

== Background ==
The United States Marine Corps has a long history of seizing and defending advance bases. Prior to World War I, base defense was the Marine Corps' primary mission. During the war the Marines fought alongside the Army as part of an extended land campaign in France. Following the war, the Advance Base Force concept, which had been adopted in 1913, was reinvigorated with the Marines as a coastal and naval base defense force designed to set up mobile and fixed bases in the event of major landing operations within, and beyond, the territorial United States. Established in the beginning of the 20th century, the Advanced Base Force was the United States' first combined task force built on the concept of the Marine Corps' traditional role in expeditionary warfare. The slow development of the advanced base force played a significant role in the controversy over the removal of the ships' guards (Marines on Navy ships) in 1908–1909.

On December 7, 1933, Secretary of the Navy Claude A. Swanson issued General Order 241 defining the Fleet Marine Force. This change was brought about because the Marine Corps had recently adopted amphibious warfare in order to seize and defend advanced naval bases in conjunction with the fleet. Defending advanced naval bases brought with it the need for an air defense capability. Thus, in the fall of 1933 the Marine Corps assigned four students to the Coast Artillery School at Fort Monroe, Virginia. Then 1stLt James P. S. Devereaux was one of these four men. These men graduated in the summer of 1934 and were assigned to the two new batteries of coastal artillery that were commissioned at Marine Corps Base Quantico. One of these new batteries was a .50cal antiaircraft machine gun battery. Concurrent to this in 1934, the Marine Corps also started a nine month long Base Defense Weapons Course at MCB Quantico. This course instructed Marines on both coastal defense and aintiaircraft weapons. This remained the sole antiaircraft battery in the Marine Corps until July 20, 1937 when the 1st and 2d Antiaircraft Battalions were formed at MCB Quantico.

By 1939, the looming threat of Japanese aggression in the Pacific solidified the need for advance base defense in the region. Commandant Major General Thomas Holcomb formed four Defense Battalions to defend advance naval bases from ground and air attack. The core of the original battalions was formed from two infantry battalions, 1st and 2nd Battalion, 15th Marine Regiment. Subsequent Defense Battalions were formed with air defense personnel and artillerymen; infantrymen were attached as required. The first Defense Battalions included nearly 900 Marines divided into three anti-aircraft batteries, three seacoast batteries, and ground and anti-aircraft machine gun batteries. Follow-on evolutions included more sophisticated artillery, anti-aircraft guns, and search radars. These Defense Battalions provided the first combined arms teams and proved to be a very effective fighting force.

== World War II ==
In the spring of 1941, Secretary of the Navy Frank Knox approved the creation of separate infantry battalions to serve with the Defense Battalions in response to growing concern that Defense Battalions could not repel a major hostile amphibious landing. However, the United States' subsequent entry into the war created more demand for infantry units elsewhere and the Defense Battalions only occasionally received infantry support. Consequently, every Marine in a Defense Battalion also trained to fight as an infantryman. This training, while hugely beneficial to Defense Battalion Marines, failed to account for the fact that they could not defend against ground and air threats simultaneously.

In July 1941 the 5th Defense Battalion landed in Iceland as part of the 1st Provisional Marine Brigade alongside the 6th Marine Regiment and other elements of the 2nd Marine Division, augmenting British forces until they departed in September. The battalion had left its Coast Defense Group behind and exchanged the aircraft sound locators for SCR-268 radar sets. Iceland was the first ever operational use of a radar by the Marine Corps. In March 1942 the battalion was relieved by the Army's 61st Coast Artillery Regiment.

By December 1941, the Marine Corps' six Defense Battalions consisted of 5,000 Marines and constituted 20 percent of the total FMF. These six battalions were given sole responsibility for defending the islands of Wake, Johnston, and Midway, and represented the Allies' first line of defense against any Japanese aggression in the Pacific. Defense Battalions were among the first to embrace the "detachment concept" and task organize as required for the mission on each island. After the attack on Pearl Harbor, where defenders shot down three planes on 7 December 1941, the defense battalions expanded rapidly. On 8 December, the Japanese began an assault on Wake Island, and the defenders, including 399 Marines of the 1st Defense Battalion, surrendered after a prolonged battle on 23 December.

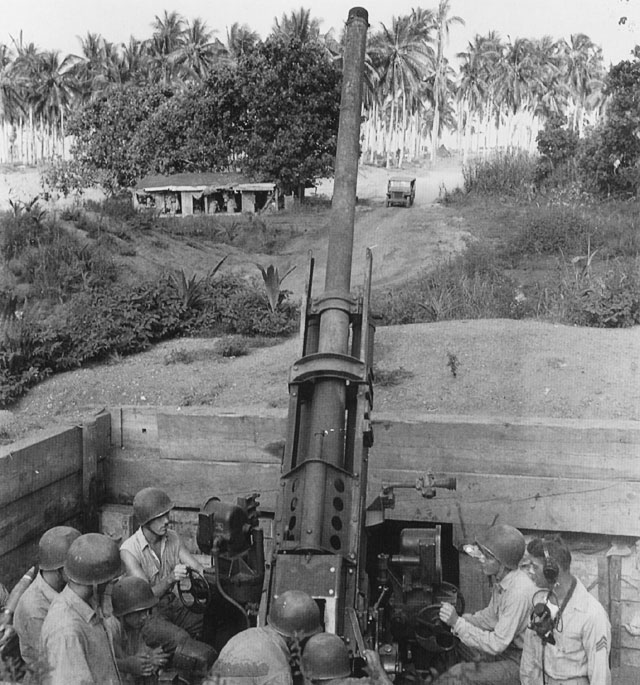
An anti-aircraft gun crew of the 3rd Defense Battalion at Guadalcanal

1942 saw the Marine defense battalions reinforce, redeploy and grow. On 4 June, the Marines of the 6th Defense Battalion at Midway Island fended off a Japanese aerial attack, which contributed to the victory of the naval battle hundreds of miles away. On 7 August, the 3rd Defense Battalion went ashore at Guadalcanal in support of the 1st Marine Division. After Henderson Airfield was secured, the battalion assumed perimeter security and repulsed several enemy counterattacks.

In the summer of 1943, elements of the 9th, 10th, and 11th Defense Battalions supported the Army's XIV Corps in the central Solomons campaign. In 1944 additional battalions helped clear the northern islands, including Bougainville. By the end of 1943, the Defense Battalions reached a maximum strength 26,685 Marines across 19 Battalions. As the threat to advanced naval bases decreased later in the war, Defense Battalions were decommissioned or reformed as anti-aircraft battalions.

As the war progressed, the Marine Corps executed more offensive missions and shifted focus from solely defending bases to seizing and defending enemy islands. The transition to a more offensive employment method forced the Defense Battalions to adapt, leading to tremendous growth in strength, weaponry, and capabilities. During subsequent assaults, Defense Battalions landed with initial assault waves of the amphibious force and protected key terrain such as beachheads, harbors, and airfields, thereby freeing infantry units to push inland and conduct more offensive operations.

In early 1944, the Marshall Islands became the next target in the Pacific, and the Marine defenders moved in. By summer, they came ashore in the Mariana Islands, including Saipan, and Guam. During that time, Commandant of the Marine Corps Lt. Gen. Alexander Vandegrift began to scale back on defense battalions. Two were disbanded, and the remaining began to gradually focus on anti-aircraft defense, rather than coastal defense. Only the 6th, 51st, and 52nd remained designated as defense battalions by 1945 with the rest becoming anti-aircraft artillery units under Fleet Marine Force, Pacific.

In late 1944, the 2nd, 5th, 8th, and 16th Antiaircraft Artillery (formerly Defense) Battalions formed the 1st Provisional Antiaircraft Artillery Group in preparation to invade the Japanese Home Islands. While they did not participate in the Battle of Iwo Jima, they did land on Okinawa in April 1945. Soon after, the Japanese surrender most of the defense battalions were deactivated as the Marine Corps dramatically scaled down in size.

Marine defense battalions were seen as an ideal platform for integrating African Americans into units with white leaders, since they trained independently and fought in isolated areas. Those recruits slated for defense battalions were trained at the then-segregated Montford Point (now known as Camp Gilbert H. Johnson, part of the Marine Corps Base Camp Lejeune complex in North Carolina). They would then be assigned to the two black defense battalions, the 51st and 52nd.

== Demobilization, the Korean War and development of SAMs ==
The close of World War II and subsequent manpower reductions left the island-hopping AA Battalions without a legitimate peacetime role. These battalions were among the first units to be deactivated and by the outbreak of the Korean War the Marine Corps was down to two active duty 90mm AAA Battalions in the Fleet Marine Force. The majority of the Marine Corps' air defense capability during this time was maintained in the reserves with air defense batteries scattered all around the country. Expansion of the Marine Corps during the Korean War did see the addition of two Anti-Aircraft Artillery (Automatic Weapons) Battalions and a 75mm Anti-Aircraft Artillery Battery. The automatic Weapons battalions initially utilized M-55 quad-.50 machine guns and towed, 40mm Bofors cannons. These battalions eventually upgraded to M42 Dusters and mounted the M-55 quad-.50 machine guns on the back of an M16 Multiple Gun Motor Carriages in order to be completely self-propelled. The 1st 75mm Anti-Air Artillery Battery

With the advent of Surface-to-Air Missile (SAM) systems the Marine Corps began to re-evaluate its current force posture. 3d Defense Battalion, which was deactivated in December 1944, was reactivated as 1st Provisional Marine Guided Missile Battalion on 11 October 1951 at Naval Air Weapons Station China Lake, CA. Four years later, on 7 February 1955, the 1st Provisional Marine Guided Missile Battalion was re-designated the 1st Terrier Surface-To-Air Missile Battalion after its newly adopted primary weapon system, the Convair RIM-2 Terrier. The USMC had two Terrier battalions equipped with specially modified twin sea launchers for land use that fired the SAM-N-7 version of the missile. The launchers were reloaded by a special vehicle that carried two Terrier reloads. The Terrier was the first surface-to-air missile operational with the USMC. On 1 June 1956 the battalion's designation was changed to the 1st Medium Anti-Aircraft Missile Battalion (1st MAAM Battalion). Even as the Terrier Missile System was being fielded the Marine Corps was aware that the system did not meet the expeditionary needs of the service. To that end, the Marine Corps was already pursuing another medium-range SAM that being developed by the Army, the MIM-23 Homing All the Way Killer (HAWK).

HAWK development began in 1952 when the United States Army initiated the search for a medium range, semi-active radar homing SAM. Northrop Grumman received the development contract for the launcher, radars, and fire control systems in July 1954. Raytheon would be responsible for missile construction. The first test launch of the missile, then designated the XSAM-A-18, occurred in June 1956. By July 1957, development was completed and the missile's designation changed from XM3 to XM3E1.

The U.S. Army fielded the first HAWK missiles in 1959 with the Marine Corps following suit a year later. A new weapon system meant re-designation for the Terrier Battalions, so 1st MAAM Battalion became the 3rd Light Antiaircraft Missile (LAAM) Battalion. In May 1962, command of Marine Corps air defense units was transferred from the artillery focused Force Troops to underneath the auspices of Marine Corps Aviation who now had full control of all aircraft and missiles. This transfer was the result of the fielding of the HAWK Missile and the development of the Marine Tactical Data System which would be utilized by Marine Corps early warning radar units to cue the HAWKs to incoming threats. The In 1962, the USMC deployed elements of 3rd LAAM Battalion to South Florida and Guantanamo Bay Naval Base, Cuba, during the Cuban missile crisis. After the crisis passed, 3rd LAAM Battalion moved permanently from Twentynine Palms to Marine Corps Air Station Cherry Point North Carolina.

=== The Need for Redeye ===
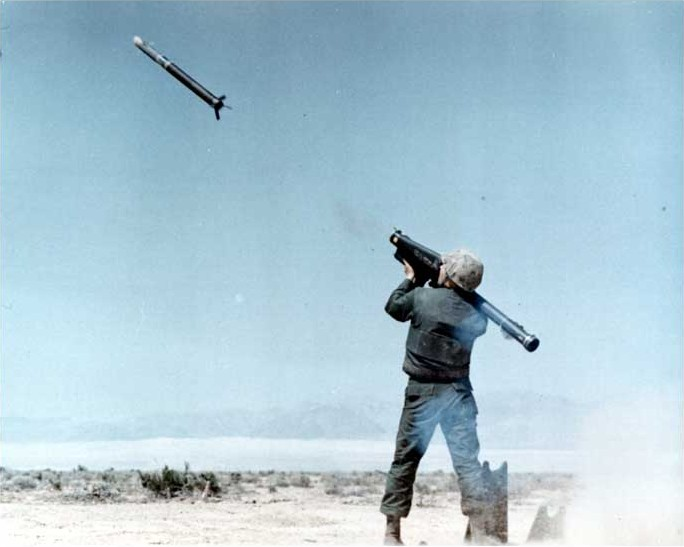
A Redeye surface-to-air missile being fired

By the mid-1950s, medium and high-altitude anti-aircraft missiles were becoming so effective that an increasing proportion of attack aircraft could be expected to enter the battle space at low altitudes. The ever-increasing speed and maneuverability of low-flying jet aircraft decreased warning time and increased the need for effective low-altitude air defense weapons. The existing fire control methods were inadequate to meet the challenges that advanced high-performance aircraft presented. Drawing upon its years of experience as a Navy missile development contractor, Convair began feasibility studies of a very lightweight, man-portable, low altitude missile system in 1951. Designed to be carried and shoulder-launched by individual field personnel using a bazooka-type launcher, the original missile, designated Redeye, was advertised with a Probability of Kill (PK) of 35 to 40 percent and a maximum effective range of about two nautical miles.

== Marine air defense during the Vietnam War ==
The Vietnam War was a Cold War military conflict that occurred in Vietnam, Laos, and Cambodia from November 1955 to April 1975. In 1954, colonial France surrendered to the Viet Minh rebels ending the First Indochina War, creating the nations of North and South Vietnam along the 17th parallel. The Vietnam War began shortly thereafter and was fought between North Vietnam, supported by such communist allies as China and the Soviet Union, and South Vietnam, supported by the United States and other anti-communist nations. North Vietnam initiated and maintained an insurgent campaign in the South under the National Liberation Front (NLF), otherwise known as the Viet Cong (VC), and provided NLF members with medicine, weapons, and training. Simultaneously, the North Vietnamese Army engaged in a more conventional war, at times committing large units to battle. The United States entered the war to prevent a communist takeover of South Vietnam as part of their wider strategy of containment. The U.S. was involved in Vietnam as early as 1950, when military advisors were sent to assist the French in the First Indochina War. The U.S. continued its advisory assistance to South Vietnam during the 1950s, with U.S. troop levels tripling in 1961 and tripling again a year later. U.S. combat units were deployed to Vietnam beginning in 1965 after the Tonkin Gulf Resolution, which authorized the President to deploy U.S. conventional forces and spurred the military buildup in the region.

On the early morning of 7 February 1965, VC forces attacked the U.S. compound at Pleiku in the Central Highlands. In a speech addressing the nation later that day, President Lyndon B. Johnson declared that he would deploy a HAWK missile battalion to South Vietnam in support of air operations into North Vietnam south of the 20th parallel.

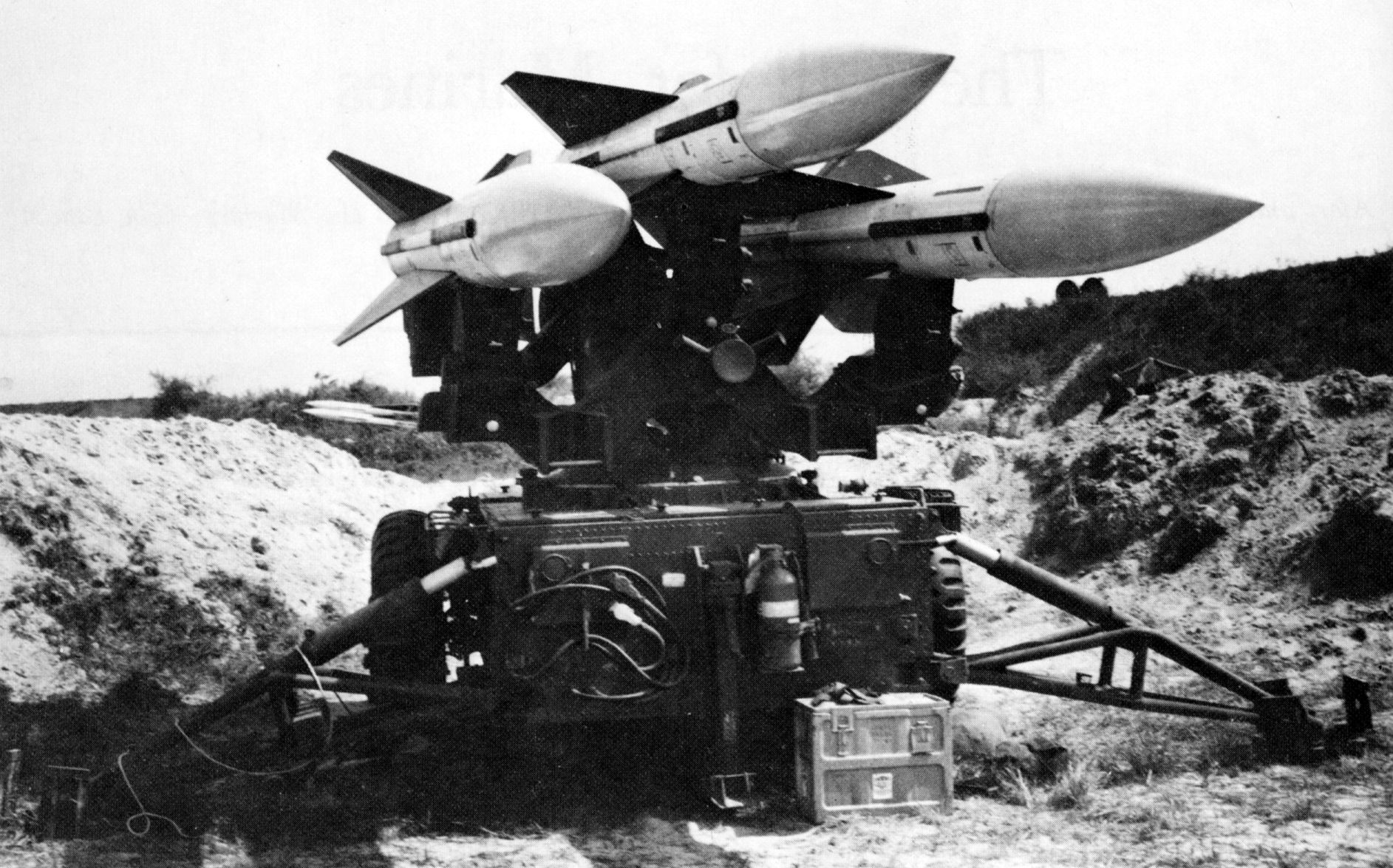
A Hawk missile launcher at Da Nang Airfled in 1965

On 15 November 1964, 1st LAAM Battalion began conducting a routine operational and readiness test exercise dubbed "Operation Anthill" at Marine Corps Base 29 Palms, California. Events quickly escalated and three days later the 600-man battalion was tasked to move out heading for an undisclosed location in the Western Pacific. 1st LAAM Battalion departed California in November 1964 arriving in Okinawa in December. Battery A, 1st LAAM was airlifted into Da Nang Air Base on 9 February and was operational that same day. Over the next week, the Air Force continually airlifted 1st LAAM Battalion Marines and equipment from Kadena Air Base on Okinawa. The battalion was increased on 18 February with the arrival of B Battery, and began establishing defensive positions around Da Nang Air Base. A Battery was emplaced on Monkey Mountain, B Battery on Hill 327 and C Battery arrived in June. As the Marine presence grew in Vietnam, 2d LAAM Battalion also joined the fight. 2nd LAAM Battalion was tasked with providing air defense for the Chu Lai Air Base. No enemy air attacks were ever attempted against the I Corps however the battalions did participate in numerous civic action programs and conducted numerous practice HAWK Missile engagements while in country.

On 1 July 1969, 1st LAAM Battalion received a warning order from higher headquarters that they would be departing Vietnam shortly. Their departure was part of President Nixon's planned reduction of American forces in Vietnam. On 19 July, after four and a half years in country, 1st LAAM ceased all air defense activities in Vietnam and began to prepare for embarkation. On 11 August 1969 Alpha and Charlie batteries boarded the USS Belle Grove (LSD-2) and the USS Tortuga (LSD-26) at Danang and departed Vietnam. Three days later, Bravo and H&S Batteries boarded the USS Tulare (AKA-112) and departed. After brief stops in Okinawa and Yokosuka the ships set sail for California. After LAAM's departure, air defense for the Danang area was provided by fighters located at the airbase.

The battalion began to arrive back in California in September 1969. Upon their return to Marine Corps Base 29 Palms, CA, 1st LAAM fell under the command of Marine Air Control Group 38 and the 3rd Marine Aircraft Wing. 1st LAAM Battalion was deactivated on 30 November 1970 as part of a post-Vietnam War cutback in the Marine Corps' end strength.

== Development of the Stinger and the growth of Low Altitude Air Defense ==
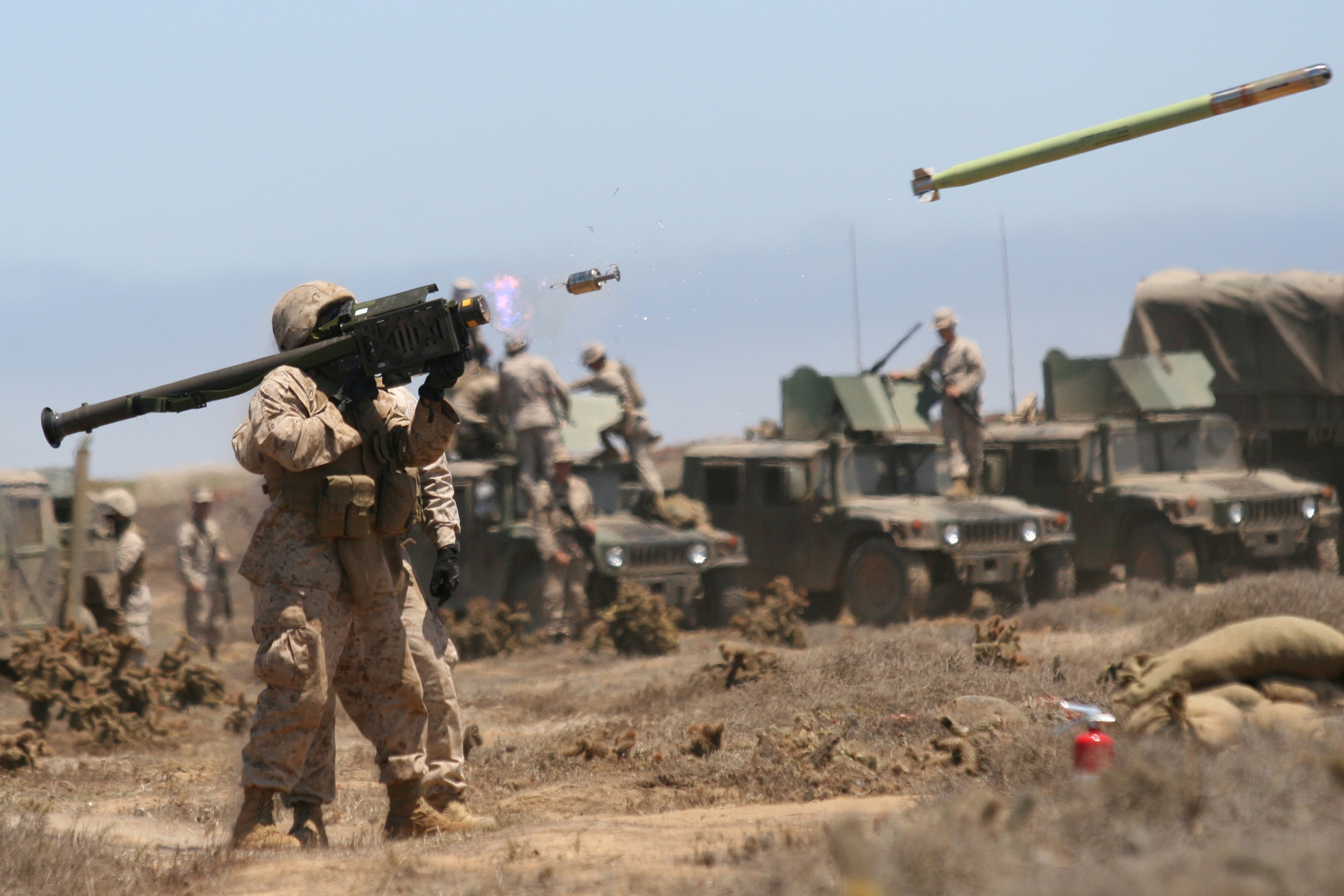
A U.S. Marine fires an FIM-92A Stinger missile during a July 2009 training exercise in California.

After the Redeye's initial fielding from 1968 to 1969, Convair engineers continued to reevaluate their design specifications and developed a faster, more agile, more accurate Redeye II in 1970. On 17 February 1971, during a special Man-portable Air Defense System (MANPADS) in-process review held at the United States Army Missile Command (MICOM), the Redeye II weapon was evaluated in competition with six other missiles. The review resulted in a recommendation for production of the Redeye II with its Identification Friend or Foe (IFF) and night vision device (NVD). On 10 March 1972, the Redeye II was re-designated as Stinger.

== LAV-AD & The Avenger ==
During the 1990s, LAAD Battalions began acquiring several new weapon systems to augment dismounted Marines carrying the Stinger missile on their shoulders. The Light Armored Vehicle-Air Defense Variant (LAV-AD) and the AN/TWQ-1 Avenger Weapons System were fielded taking into consideration concept of employment, personnel requirements, training, logistic support, and facilities requirements. The acquisition of the LAV-AD was not without opposition however the decision was made to purchase the LAV-AD due to table of organization structure availability, the current threat to the MAGTF, and the probable loss of HAWK.

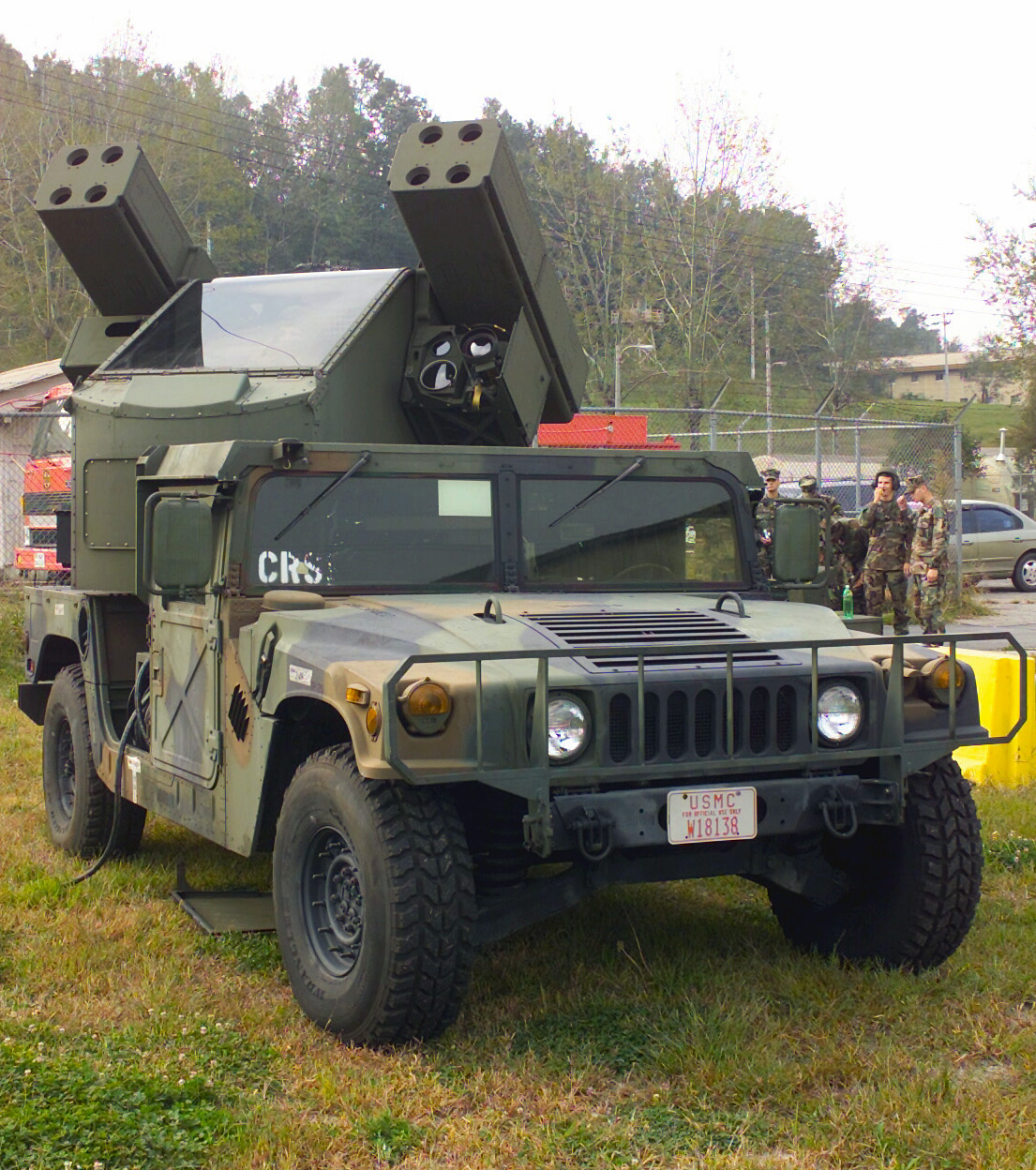
A Marine Corps FIM-92 Avenger, Pedestal Mounted Stinger Missile System mounted on a Humvee

The AN/TWQ-1 Avenger weapon system was introduced in January 1995. The Avenger provided Marine Corps air defenders with new capabilities in a lightweight, day/night, limited adverse weather fire unit for countering the threat of low altitude, high-speed fixed-wing or rotary wing aircraft. The firing unit incorporated two Standard Vehicle-Mounted Launcher (SVML) missile pods, a .50 caliber machine gun, Forward Looking Infrared (FLIR), Laser Range Finder (LRF), and IFF capability. The fully rotating, gyro-stabilized turret was mounted on the M1097 heavy High-Mobility Multipurpose Wheeled Vehicle (HMMWV). The fire unit could engage a target with missiles or the machine gun either with a gunner in the turret or from a remote location using the Remote Control Unit (RCU). On-board communication equipment provided for VHF radio and intercom operations.

== Global War on Terror ==
Marines from 2d and 3d LAAD Battalions were part of the Marine Forces that stormed into Iraq during the 2003 invasion. During the invasion they were tasked with providing mobile air defense and point defense of critical assets for the I Marine Expeditionary Force. As operations in Iraq became more static and US forces began conducting counter insurgency operations the LAAD Battalions shifted their focus of effort from ground based air defense to air base ground defense. During multiple deployments to Iraq, LAAD units coordinated the defense of Al Asad Airbase which was the home of the 3rd Marine Aircraft Wing while the Marine Corps was responsible for security in Anbar Province from 2004 through 2009.

== Future ==
In recent years the Marine Corps has been working with the Navy's Office of Naval Research to develop a vehicle mounted directed energy weapon system against all manner of emerging threats.

== See also ==
- Marine defense battalions
- United States Marine Corps Aviation
- 1st Anti-Aircraft Artillery (Automatic Weapons) Battalion
- List of United States Marine Corps aviation support squadrons
