= John H. Griebel =

U.S. Marine Corps Brigadier General

John Houghton Griebel
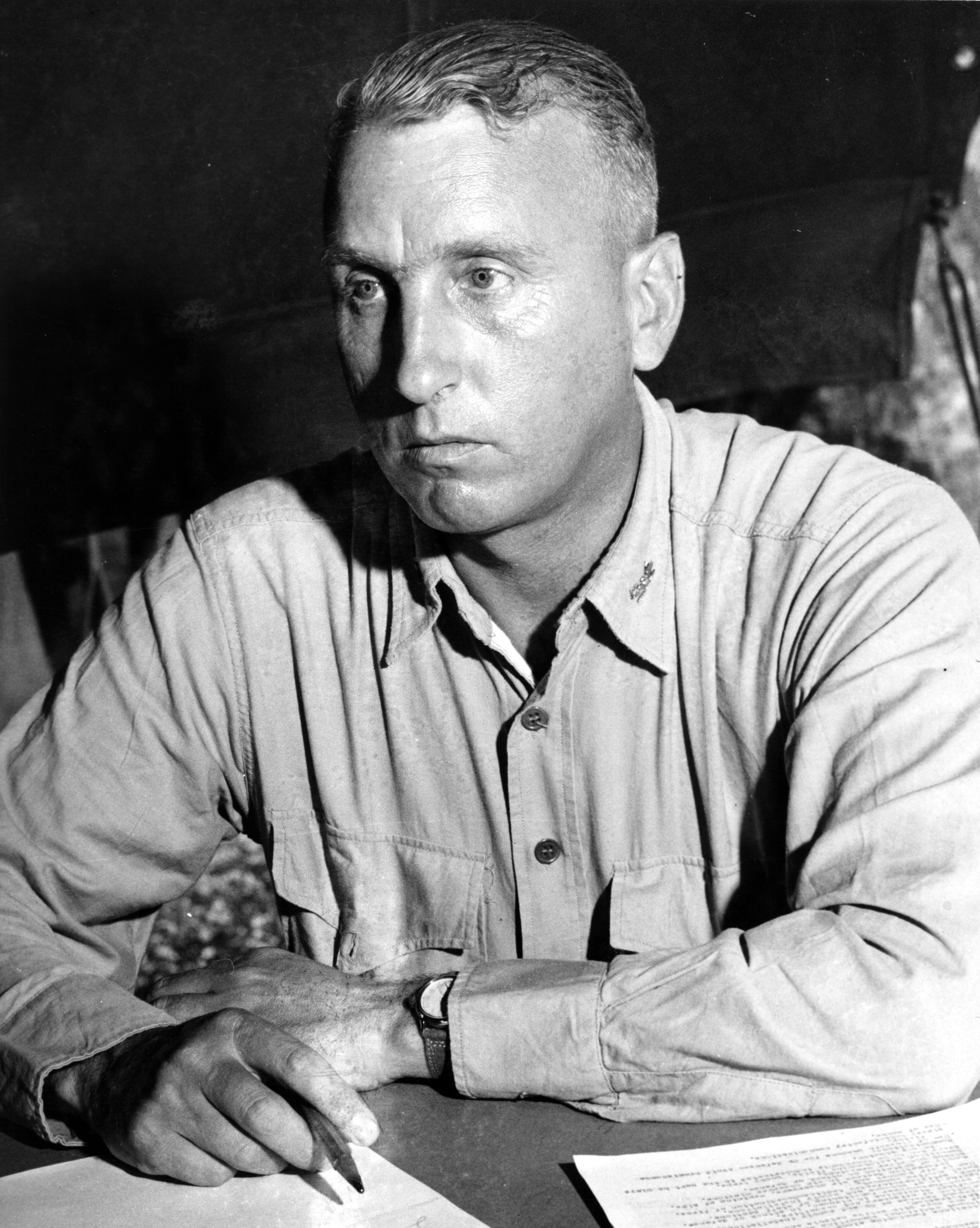
- John H. Griebel as Colonel, USMC
- Born: June 28, 1901; Hartford, Connecticut, U.S.
- Died: March 10, 1969 (aged 67); Harrison, New York, U.S.
- Military career
- Allegiance: United States of America
- Branch: United States Marine Corps
- Service years: 1926–1956
- Rank: Brigadier general
- Service number: 0-4132
- Commands: 2nd Service Group; 5th Marine Regiment; 8th Marine Regiment; 6th Defense Battalion; 1st Defense Battalion
- Conflicts: Nicaraguan Campaign; Yangtze Patrol; World War II: Attack on Pearl Harbor; Battle of Saipan; Battle of Tinian; Battle of Okinawa
- Awards: Legion of Merit; Bronze Star Medal; Army Commendation Medal

John Houghton Griebel (June 28, 1901 - March 10, 1969) was a decorated officer in the United States Marine Corps with the rank of Brigadier general. A veteran of Nicaraguan Campaign and Yangtze Patrol, he later distinguished himself as commanding officer, 5th Marine Regiment during the Battle of Okinawa.

== Early years ==
John H. Griebel was born on June 28, 1901, in Hartford, Connecticut, the son of William H. and Catherine Houghton Griebel. Following the high school, he entered the Rutgers University, where he was a member of the Reserve Officers' Training Corps and reached the rank of captain.

He graduated in June 1926 with Bachelor of Science degree in Civil Engineering and was commissioned second lieutenant in the Marine Corps that same month. Griebel was subsequently ordered to the Basic School at Philadelphia Navy Yard for basic officer training, which he completed in February 1927 and embarked for Nicaragua as a member of the 2nd Marine Brigade under Brigadier general Logan Feland.

Griebel took participated in the jungle patrols against Sandino bandits until August that year and returned to the United States. Following his return stateside, he was stationed for four months at the Marine Barracks, San Diego, California and then left for duty in China. Griebel served as a Company Officer with 6th Marine Regiment in Tianjin until January 1929, when he was transferred to 4th Marine Regiment in Shanghai.

He spent two months with guard duties at Shanghai International Settlement and then embarked for the Philippines for three-month duty with the Marine Barracks at Olongapo. Griebel then returned to Shanghai and remained there until February 1930, when he was ordered back to the United States.

Griebel subsequently served with the Marine Detachment at the Rapidan Camp at Criglersville, Virginia, which served as rustic retreat for President Herbert Hoover and his wife Lou Henry Hoover. He served in that assignment until December 1930 and embarked again for Nicaragua for duty with the 2nd Marine Brigade under Brigadier general Frederic L. Bradman. Upon his return stateside, Griebel served with the Marine Barracks at New York Navy Yard until January 1932, when he was ordered to the Panama Canal Zone for guard duties. While in this capacity, he was promoted to first lieutenant in November 1932.

He was ordered to the Marine Corps Schools, Quantico in June 1934 and completed the Junior Course several months later. Griebel then served at the Marine Barracks Quantico until June 1936, when he was promoted to captain and ordered to San Diego, where he received orders to join 4th Marine Regiment under Colonel Charles F. B. Price.

Griebel then served his second tour of duty in Shanghai until November 1937, when he was appointed Commanding officer of the Marine Detachment aboard the gunboat USS Sacramento. He participated in the patrol cruises off the coast of Shanghai until September 1938, when he returned for duty in Shanghai. In July 1939, Griebel was transferred to the Naval Station Cavite, Philippine Islands.

== World War II ==
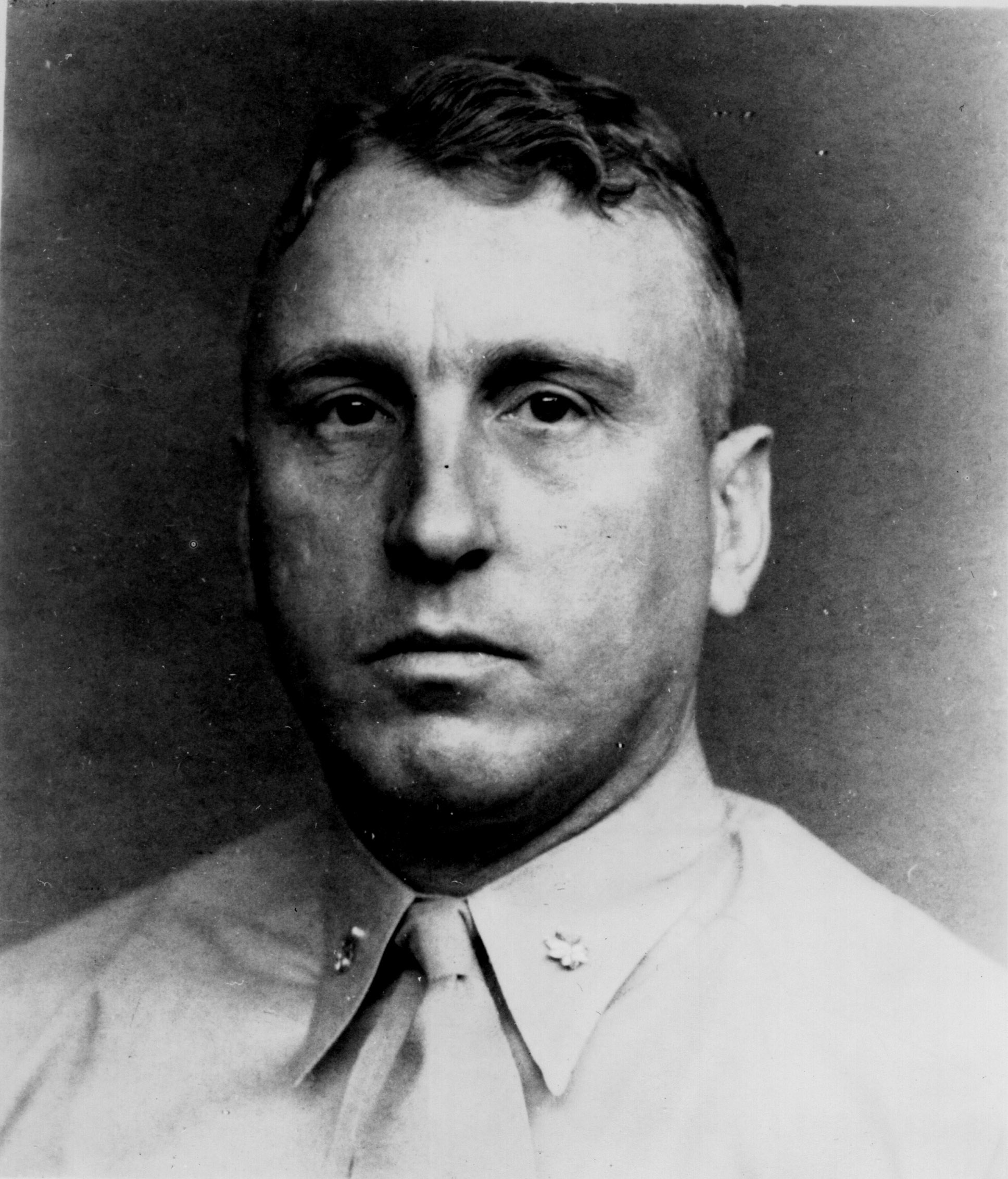
Griebel as Major in 1942

Griebel was ordered back to the United States in August 1940 and assumed duty as Post Maintenance Officer at Marine Barracks, Quantico under Major general Louis M. Little and Holland Smith consecutively. He served in this capacity until June 1942, when he assumed command of 155mm Group of the 10th Marine Defense Battalion under Colonel Robert Blake at San Diego, California.

The Marine Defense Battalions were special marine units, which were designated the defense force of the Pacific naval bases and should be placed on Midway Atoll, Wake Island, Johnston Atoll and Palmyra Atoll. Shortly after he joined the 10th Defense Battalion, he was promoted to major.

Griebel participated in the training of 10th Defense Battalion in San Diego until August 1942, when he was promoted to lieutenant colonel and ordered to Midway for duty as commanding officer, 6th Defense Battalion. His battalion was tasked with defense against possible Japanese attack from the sea or air just few weeks following the Battle of Midway, a decisive naval battle in the Pacific Theater. For his service on Midway, Griebel received Army Commendation Medal.

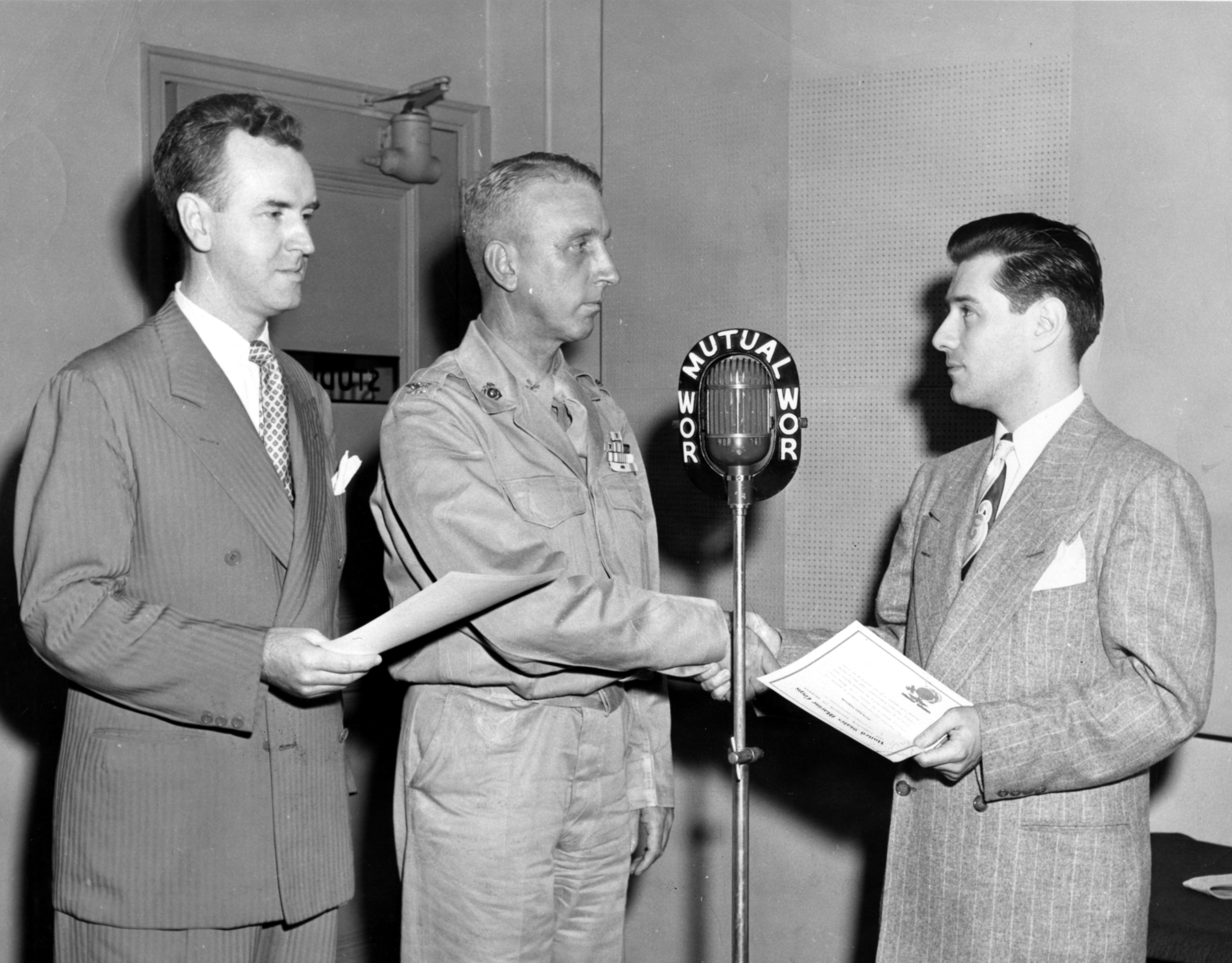
Griebel as Director of Third Marine Corps Reserve District, hands over the Letter of Appreciation to composers of Marine Reserve Marching Song.

He remained in that assignment until the end of December 1943 and joined 8th Marine Regiment as acting Commanding officer. The 8th Marines needed rest and refit after heavy fighting on Tarawa as the part of 2nd Marine Division and Griebel spent four months with the intensive training in mountainous area between the great volcanoes of Mauna Kea and Mauna Loa. He was relieved from his temporary command at the beginning of April 1944 and transferred to the staff of 2nd Marine Regiment under Colonel Walter J. Stuart as Executive officer.

The 2nd Marine Division, including 2nd Marines, finally embarked for Saipan, Mariana Islands in late May 1944 and Griebel took part in landing on June 15. The regiment subsequently assaulted Tinian Island in July/August 1944 and Griebel received Bronze Star Medal with Combat "V" for his service in the Marianas.

He was ordered back to the United States in September 1944 and attached to the Headquarters Marine Corps in Washington, D.C., but remained there only until the beginning of October that year, when he was promoted to colonel and ordered back to the Pacific area. Griebel subsequently assumed command of 5th Marine Regiment located at Peleliu, Palau Islands. The regiment took part in the heavy fighting and upon Griebel's arrival, began with gradual withdrawal to Pavuvu, Russell Islands for rest and refit.

Griebel was again tasked with the rebuilding of the regiment and after almost six months there, Fifth Marines embarked as the part of 1st Marine Division under Major general Pedro del Valle for Okinawa. He landed on Okinawa on April 1, 1945, and led his regiment during the heavy fighting of Awacha Pocket, Wana ridge, Shuri Castle and Makabe town. He distinguished himself during the campaign and was decorated with Legion of Merit with Combat "V".

== Postwar service ==
Following the Okinawa campaign, Griebel assumed command of 8th Service Regiment on Hawaii and his regiment consisted of engineer company, signal company, military police company, ordnance company, supply company, transport company and several Marine ammo companies, which provided logistics support for 2nd Marine Division units. Griebel's command was later redesignated 2nd Service Group and he led that command until May 1948.

Griebel was subsequently ordered to New York City, where he assumed duty as Director, 3rd Marine Corps Reserve District. His duty included also inspection of reserve and recruitment units, and to make calls on governors and other public officials. He held that command until August 1, 1956, when he retired after 30 years of commissioned service. Griebel was subsequently advanced to the rank of brigadier general for having been specially commended in combat.

Brigadier general John H. Griebel died of heart failure on March 10, 1969, aged 67, at his apartment in Harrison, New York.

== Decorations ==
Here is the ribbon bar of Brigadier General Griebel:

1st Row	Legion of Merit with Combat "V"		Bronze Star Medal with Combat "V"
2nd Row	Army Commendation Medal	Navy Presidential Unit Citation with one star	Marine Corps Expeditionary Medal
3rd Row	Second Nicaraguan Campaign Medal	China Service Medal	American Defense Service Medal
4th Row	Asiatic-Pacific Campaign Medal with four 3/16 inch service stars	World War II Victory Medal	National Defense Service Medal

== See also ==
- Marine defense battalions
- Battle of Okinawa

Military offices
Preceded by Harold D. Harris	Commanding Officer, 5th Marine Regiment; October 1, 1944 - June 23, 1945	Succeeded by Julian N. Frisbie
Preceded by Paul D. Sherman	Commanding Officer, 8th Marine Regiment; January 2, 1944 - April 9, 1944	Succeeded by Clarence R. Wallace
