= 2nd Antiaircraft Artillery Battalion (Composite) =

18th Antiaircraft Artillery Battalion
- 18th Defense Battalion insignia
- Active: 15 Jul 1943 – Sep 1947
- Country: United States of America
- Branch: United States Marine Corps
- Type: Air Defense/Coastal Defense
- Size: ~1000 men
- Engagements: World War II

Commanders
- Current commander: N/A
- Notable commanders: Harold C. Roberts; William J. Van Ryzin

The 2d Antiaircraft Artillery Battalion (Composite) (2d AAA Bn [Composite]) was a United States Marine Corps antiaircraft unit that served during World War II. Formed in 1943 as the 3d Airdrome Battalion, its original mission was strictly providing air defense. On 1 October 1943 the battalion was redesignated the 18th Defense Battalion. During the war the battalion provided air defense for the Saipan and Tinian area of operations. The battalion returned to Marine Corps Base Camp Lejeune, North Carolina after the war receiving its final designation on 16 May 1946. The battalion was decommission in September 1947.

== History ==
The 3d Airdrome Battalion was commissioned on 15 July 1943 at Marine Corps Base Camp Lejeune, North Carolina. The Airdrome battalions were essentially defense battalions minus the coastal defense capabilities. The Marine Corps had planned to utilize them to defend airfields overseas. On 1 October 1943 the battalion was re-designated as the 18th Defense Battalion. As the war progressed, the Marine Corps removed coastal artillery from the defense battalions in order to form additional heavy artillery units for the Fleet Marine Force. Because of the divestiture of the coastal defense mission, the battalion was re-designated as the 18th Antiaircraft Artillery Battalion on 15 May 1944.

3d Airdrome Battalion Table of Organization:

- Headquarters and Service Battery
  - Light tank platoon
- 90mm Gun Group
  - 3 x 90mm Gun batteries
- Searchlight Batteries
  - 2 x batteries each w/ six lights
- Special Weapons Group
  - 40mm Battery (w/ 12 guns)
  - 2 x machine gun platoons
    - 12 x .50cal water-cooled antiaircraft guns
    - 12 x .30cal water-cooled antiaircraft guns

The battalion departed from San Diego, California in late June 1944 and arrived at Pearl Harbor, Hawaii in early July 1944. By August 1944, elements of the battalion were located on both Saipan and Tinian. The battalions was finally consolidated on Tinian by September 1944. It remained on Tinian providing air defense coverage for the remainder of the war. On December 1, 1945, the commanding officer of the 18th Anti-Aircraft Battalion, LtCol Howard G. Kirgis, accepted the surrender of the last Imperial Japanese garrison on Saipan led by Captain Sakae Ōba. In January 1946 the battalion embarked onto the USS Manila Bay and USS Wheatland (AKA-85) to return to the United States. It arrived at Marine Corps Base Camp Lejeune in February 1946.

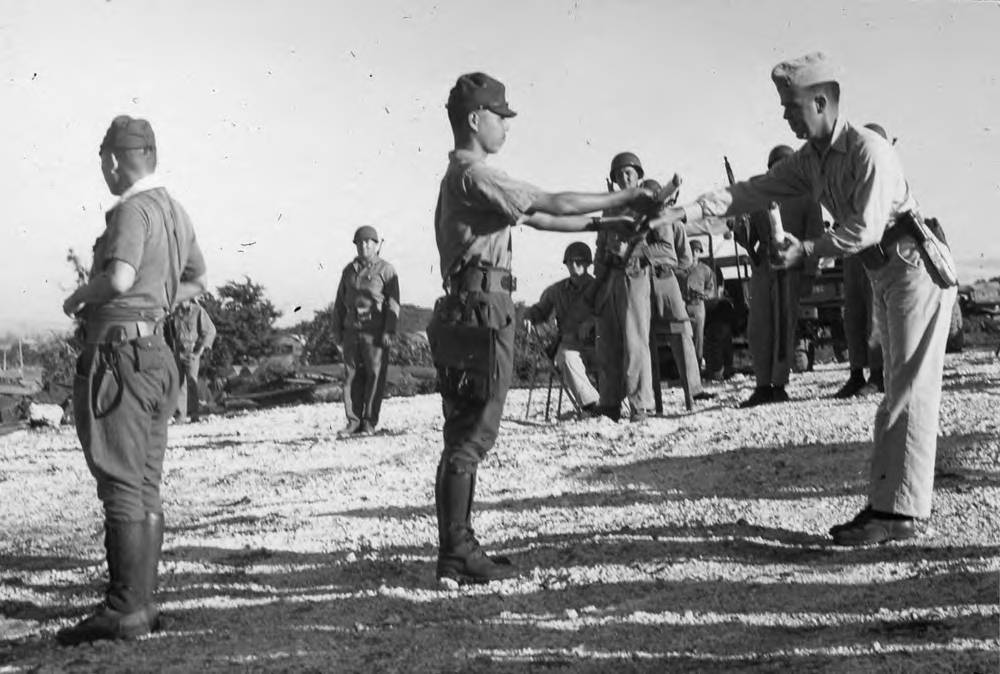
Japanese Imperial Army Captain Sakae Ōba surrenders his Samurai sword to Lieutenant Colonel Howard G. Kurgis, USMC, at Saipan, Mariana Islands on Saturday morning, December 1, 1945.

By May 1946, the 9th and 18th Antiaircraft Artillery Battalions were the last two remaining. They were re-designated as the 1st and 2d Antiaircraft Artillery Battalions (Composite).

== Unit awards ==
A unit citation or commendation is an award bestowed upon an organization for the action cited. Members of the unit who participated in said actions are allowed to wear on their uniforms the awarded unit citation. The 2d Antiaircraft Artillery Battalion (Composite) has been presented with the following awards:

Streamer	Award	Year(s)	Additional Info
	World War II Victory Streamer	1941–1945	Pacific War

== See also ==
- Marine Defense Battalions
- List of United States Marine Corps aviation support units
