= Charles I. Murray =

U.S. Marine Corps Brigadier General

Charles Ira Murray
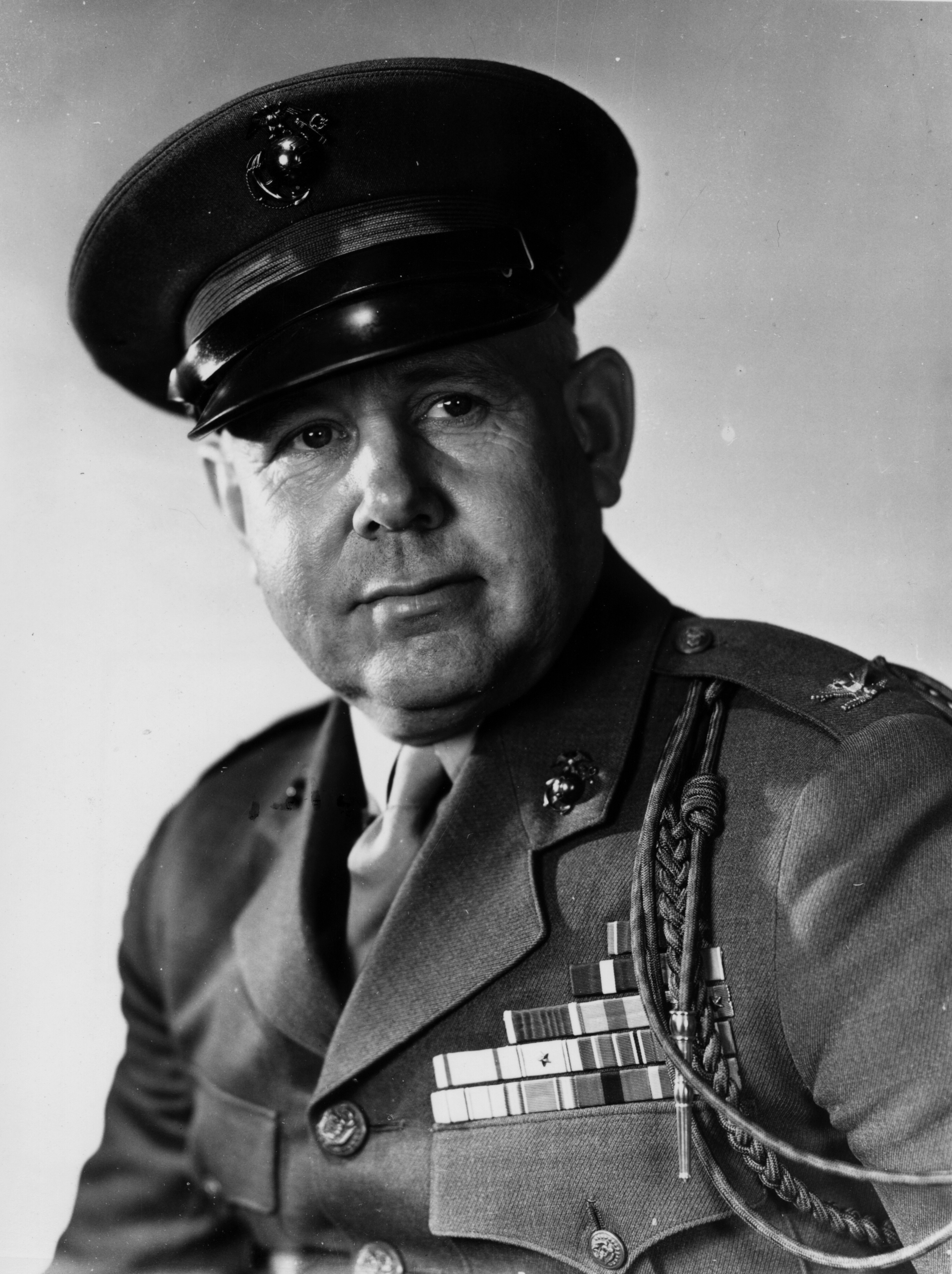
- Murray as colonel, USMC
- Born: May 4, 1896; Sewickley, Pennsylvania, US
- Died: September 24, 1977 (aged 81); Fort Sam Houston, Texas, US
- Burial place: Fort Sam Houston National Cemetery
- Military career
- Allegiance: United States
- Branch: United States Marine Corps
- Service years: 1917–1948
- Rank: Brigadier general
- Service number: 0-700
- Commands: 4th Marine Regiment; 6th Defense Battalion; 2nd Defense Battalion
- Conflicts: World War I: Battle of Belleau Wood; Battle of Blanc Mont Ridge; Meuse-Argonne Offensive; Yangtze Patrol; Haitian Campaign; World War II: Occupation of Iceland; Recapture of Guam
- Awards: Navy Cross; Distinguished Service Cross; Bronze Star Medal; Purple Heart

Charles Ira Murray (May 4, 1896 – September 24, 1977) was a highly decorated officer of the United States Marine Corps with the rank of brigadier general, who distinguished himself while serving with 6th Marine Regiment during World War I.

Murray later served as deputy commander with the military staff on Guam.

== Early career and World War I ==
Charles I. Murray was born on May 4, 1896, in Sewickley, Pennsylvania, and later attended the Culver Military Academy in Culver, Indiana. Following his graduation in May 1917, he was commissioned a second lieutenant on May 21, then was subsequently sent to the Marine Corps Rifle Range in Winthrop, Maryland for basic training, where he remained until the end of June.

At the beginning of July 1917, Murray was ordered to the Basic School at Marine Barracks Quantico, where he received further officers training. In August of the same year, he was promoted to the rank of first lieutenant and subsequently attached to 79th Company, 2nd Battalion, 6th Marine Regiment.

His regiment under Colonel Harry Lee sailed overseas and arrived in France in January 1918. Murray entered the trenches in the Toulouse sector near Verdun in March 1918 and subsequently participated in the Battle of Belleau Wood on June 6. During the night attack near Bouresches, he led his platoon until he was wounded in both arms by enemy machine gun fire. Murray remained with his platoon until he was not able to advance and subsequently refused assistance and walked to the rear alone.

For his gallantry in action, Murray was decorated with the Distinguished Service Cross and later with the Navy Cross. He also received the Purple Heart for his wounds.

Following his recovery, Murray was promoted to the rank of captain on July 1, 1918, and returned to his company. He participated in the Battle of Blanc Mont Ridge and Meusse Argonne Offensive and upon the Armistice he later returned to the United States in January 1919. For his service in France, Murray was also decorated with Belgian Order of Leopold II, rank Chevalier and received the French Fourragère.

== Interwar period ==
Following his return to the United States in February 1919, Captain Murray was assigned to the Marine Barracks Mare Island, California, but one month later, he received his orders for transfer to Headquarters Marine Corps in Washington, D.C. Here he was appointed to the very prestigious job for a junior officer, Aide-de-camp to the Commandant of the Marine Corps, Major General George Barnett. When Barnett was tasked with the activation of the Department of the Pacific in San Francisco at the end of 1920, he requested Murray again as his aide-de-camp in March 1921.

Murray remained in this capacity until October 1921, when he was transferred to the Marine detachment aboard the battleship USS Oklahoma. He took part in the patrol cruises over with the Pacific Fleet and during May 1924, Murray was transferred to Spokane, Washington, for recruiting duty. While in this capacity, he attended special courses of Bookkeeping, Accounting and Auditing at Marine Corps Institute in January 1925.

The recruiting duties lasted until October 1926, when he was ordered to the Marine barracks at Hingham Naval Ammunition Depot, Massachusetts, where he served as Company officer for two years. His next service assignment was the same with Marine Barracks at the Brooklyn Navy Yard from June to September 1928, before he was ordered for foreign shore duty to Haiti. Murray served as an instructor with Garde d'Haïti and also took part in the skirmishes with rebel forces. For his distinguished service there, he was decorated with Haitian Distinguished Service Medal and Diploma by the Government of Haiti.

Murray returned stateside in August 1931 and was assigned to the Marine Corps Schools Quantico, Virginia in order to attend the Field Officers Course. Following completion of the instruction, he was ordered to Annapolis, Maryland, and appointed commanding officer of Marine detachment aboard the USS Reina Mercedes, which served as a detention vessel and barracks ship for the United States Naval Academy. While in this capacity, he was promoted to the rank of major in July 1932.

During the May 1933, Murray was transferred to the staff of Fleet Marine Force in San Diego under Major General Charles H. Lyman. Under his command, he was promoted to the rank of lieutenant colonel on October 1, 1935. When General Lyman was appointed commanding general of Department of the Pacific in San Francisco at the beginning of July 1937, Murray followed him to California and served on his staff again. He spent several months in sunny California until he was ordered to the Naval Base Guam in March 1938 as commanding officer of the local Marine Barracks.

Murray was subsequently appointed executive officer of the 4th Marine Regiment under Colonel Charles F. B. Price and sailed for China, where he participated in the guard duty at Shanghai International Settlement. During his time in China, he also had the privilege to command the 4th Marines, when he was appointed temporary commanding officer at the beginning of December 1939. Murray was succeeded by Colonel Dewitt Peck on January 2, 1940, and continued as executive officer until August 1940.

== World War II ==
His next orders brought him back to San Diego, where he was attached to 2nd Marine Brigade under Brigadier General Clayton B. Vogel, however during the end of November 1940, Murray was transferred to Hawaii and appointed commanding officer of the 2nd Defense Battalion stationed there. In this command, he was tasked with anti-aircraft and coastal defense of the Hawaii Islands until the end of February 1941.

Murray was subsequently appointed commanding general of the newly activated 6th Defense Battalion on Hawaii, before he was ordered back to the United States to the 2nd Marine Division. During July 1941 Murray was transferred to the staff of 1st Provisional Marine Brigade under Brigadier General John Marston and sailed to Iceland, where he participated in the occupation of the Island as Brigade Executive officer until late 1941.

Following his return stateside, Murray served with 2nd Marine Division until January 1942, when he was promoted to the rank of colonel and transferred to Panama Canal Zone, where he served as commanding officer of the Marine Barracks Balboa and District Marine Officer, 15th Naval District under Rear Admiral Frank H. Sadler.

Murray remained in Panama until August 1943, when he was ordered back to San Diego and appointed chief of staff of the Fleet Marine Force under Major General Holland M. Smith. Colonel Murray finally sailed for Pacific theater in April 1944, when he was appointed deputy commander for plans of the Military Government on Guam under Major General Henry L. Larsen.

He distinguished himself in this capacity and was decorated with a Bronze Star Medal at the end of his tour of duty in June 1945. Murray was subsequently transferred to Okinawa, where he served as deputy commander, U.S. Naval Government under Rear admiral John D. Price until June 1946.

== Postwar life ==
Colonel Murray returned to the United States during summer of 1946 and, after a brief leave, was appointed deputy commander and chief of staff of Department of the Pacific in San Francisco under his old superior, Major General Henry L. Larsen. He finally retired from the Marine Corps on August 1, 1948, and was advanced to the rank of brigadier general for having been specially commended in combat.

Upon his retirement, he resided in Fort Sam Houston, Texas, where he later died on September 24, 1977, and was buried at Fort Sam Houston National Cemetery together with his wife, Kathleen H. Murray.

== Decorations ==
Here is the ribbon bar of Brigadier General Charles I. Murray:

| 1st Row | Navy Cross | | Distinguished Service Cross | Bronze Star Medal | French Fourragère |
| 2nd Row | Purple Heart | Marine Corps Expeditionary Medal | World War I Victory Medal with four battle clasps | China Service Medal | French Fourragère |
| 3rd Row | American Defense Service Medal with Fleet Clasp | European–African–Middle Eastern Campaign Medal | American Campaign Medal | Asiatic-Pacific Campaign Medal with two service stars | French Fourragère |
| 4th Row | World War II Victory Medal | Navy Occupation Service Medal | Belgian Order of Leopold II, rank Chevalier | Haitian Distinguished Service Medal and Diploma | French Fourragère |

Military offices
| Preceded by Newly activated unit | Commanding Officer of 6th Defense Battalion; March 1, 1941 - March 14, 1941 | Succeeded by Raphael Griffin |
| Preceded by Thomas E. Bourke | Commanding Officer of 2nd Defense Battalion; November 25, 1940 - February 28, 1941 | Succeeded by Raymond E. Knapp |
| Preceded by Joseph C. Fegan | Commanding Officer of 4th Marine Regiment; December 4, 1939 - January 2, 1940 | Succeeded by Dewitt Peck |
