= 11th Antiaircraft Artillery Battalion =

- Active: 15 Jun 1942 – 15 Dec 1944
- Country: United States of America
- Branch: United States Marine Corps
- Type: Air Defense/Coastal Defense
- Size: ~1100 men
- Engagements: World War II: Solomon Islands campaign

Commanders
- Current commander: N/A

The 11th Antiaircraft Artillery Battalion (11th AAA Bn) was a United States Marine Corps antiaircraft unit that served during World War II. Formed in 1942 as the 11th Defense Battalion, its original mission was to provide air and coastal defense for advanced naval bases. During the war the battalion defended took part in combat operations in the Solomon Islands. The battalion's tank platoon also saw extensive action on New Georgia and Arundel Island. The battalion was decommissioned before the end of the war on December 15, 1944.

== History ==
=== Organization ===
The 11th Defense Battalion was commissioned on June 15, 1942 at Marine Corps Recruit Depot Parris Island, South Carolina. On August 26, 1942 the battalion was moved to Marine Corps Air Station New River, North Carolina. It departed New River via train on October 7, 1942 bound for the West Coast. After a month and a half in San Diego, California the battalion departed the United States on December 3, 1942.

=== Solomon Islands ===
The 11th Defense Battalion arrived at Efate in the New Hebrides on December 21, 1942. On January 14, 1943 the battalion sailed from Efate and landed at Tulagi on January 17. It was assigned air and coastal defense for the Purvis Bay area of the Florida Islands. An antiaircraft detachment from the 11th accompanied the 43rd Infantry Regiment as it cleared Banika on February 21, 1943. The det was later relieved by a detachment from the 10th Defense Battalion. During July 1943, M3A1 Stuart Light Tanks of the 11th Defense Battalion were assigned to support the 43rd Infantry Division securing Munda Point on New Georgia. After Munda, the tank section was transported via landing craft to Arundel Island where they again provided fire support for the 43rd Infantry during their seizure of the island. On July 13, 1943 another detachment was displaced when the 90 mm guns of Battery E were sent to support operations on New Georgia. Battery E went ashore on August 9 at Enogai Inlet to provide air defense following the Battle of Enogai. These 50 marines, with their 40 mm antiaircraft guns and .50 cal machine guns, were a welcome addition to the base's defense. That evening the Battery E Marines scored a "probable" shoot down on a Japanese aircraft. On September 24, 1943 the battalion ceased operations at Purvis Bay and prepared for embarkation on naval shipping.

=== New Georgia ===
The entire battalion arrived on New Georgia on September 26 and immediately began emplacing near Ondonga Airfield. On January 18, 1944 the battalion was notified that it would be soon relieved by incoming United States Army units. The battalion was officially relieved by the 276th Coast Artillery on February 10. During this time the battalion's Special Weapons Group was detached from the 40th Infantry Division on Guadalcanal. On March 10, 1944 the 11th Defense Battalion loaded all personnel and equipment onto the USS Hyperion (AK-107). New orders arrived and the ship had to be unloaded and the battalion instead moved to Arundel Island.

=== Reorganization, Hawaii and decommissioning ===
Beginning in 1944 the Marine Corps removed coastal artillery from the defense battalions in order to form additional heavy artillery units for the Fleet Marine Force. On April 20, 1944 the battalion was divested of its seacoast artillery. These Marines and their equipment were transferred to Guadalcanal and used to form 155mm gun battalions. Because of the divestiture of the coastal defense mission, the battalion was re-designated as the 11th Antiaircraft Artillery Battalion on May 16, 1944.

June 1944 saw the battalion stage on Ondongo Island preparing to move. On June 21, 481.5 short tons of the battalion's gear departed on the USS Kopara (AK-62). After some delay, an additional 440.7 short tons departed on board USS LST-398 on June 29. All elements of the battalion had arrived at Guadalcanal by July 10. The battalion continued training until November 27 when word was received that the battalion was going to be disbanded. All officers and Marines with two years overseas were sent home and other personnel were transferred to other units. The 11th Antiaircraft Artillery Battalion was decommissioned on December 15, 1944.

== Unit awards ==
A unit citation or commendation is an award bestowed upon an organization for the action cited. Members of the unit who participated in said actions are allowed to wear on their uniforms the awarded unit citation. The 11th Antiaircraft Artillery Battalion has been presented with the following awards:

Streamer	Award	Year(s)	Additional Info
	Asiatic-Pacific Campaign Streamer		Guadalcanal
	World War II Victory Streamer	1941–1945	Pacific War

== Notable former members ==
- Donald Regan - former United States Secretary of the Treasury

== See also ==
- Marine Defense Battalions
- List of United States Marine Corps aviation support units
