= Harold C. Roberts =

U.S. Marine Corps Colonel

Harold Cyrus Roberts
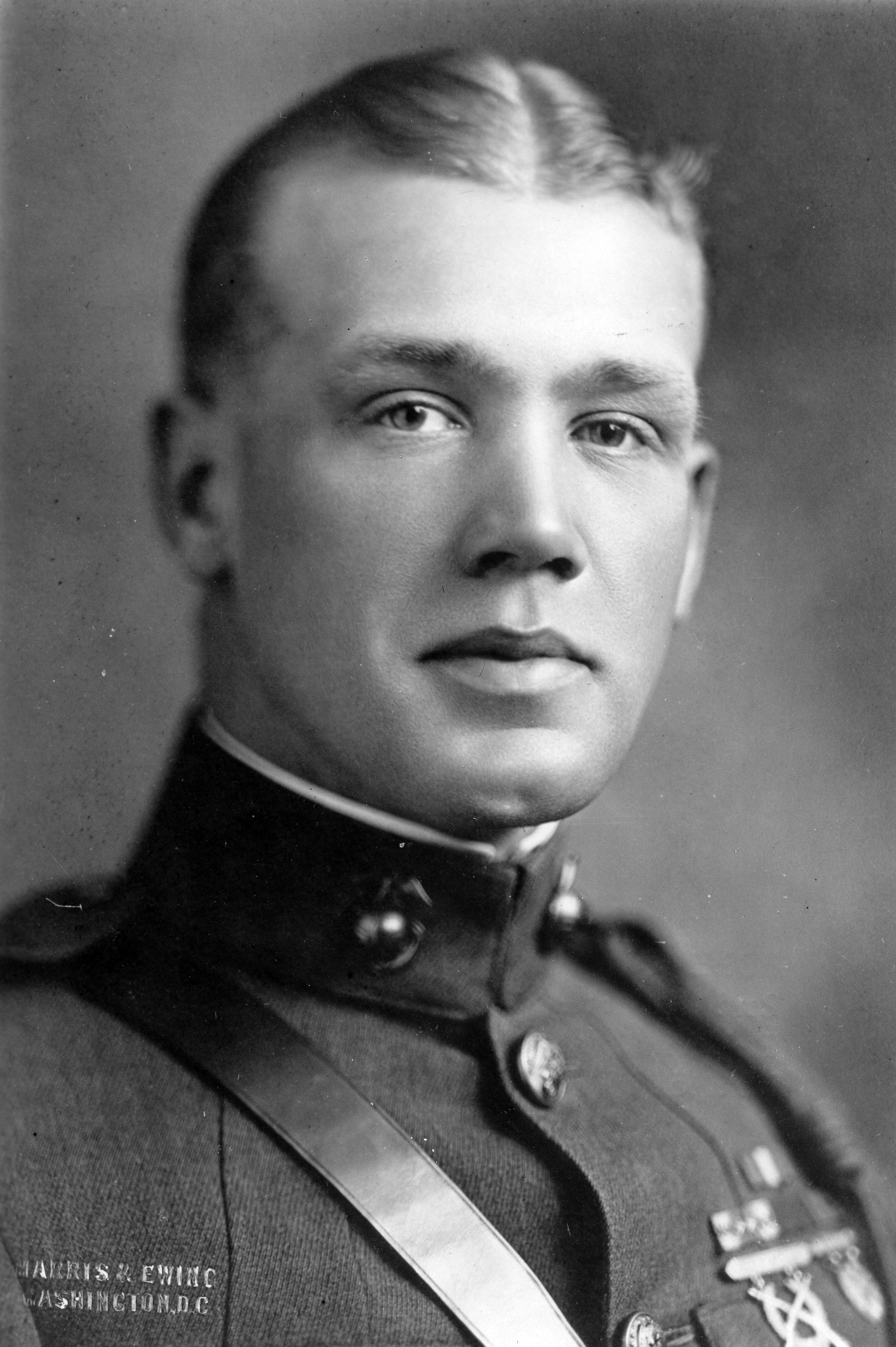
- Roberts as 2nd lieutenant, USMC
- Born: October 1, 1898; Buffalo, New York, US
- Died: June 18, 1945 (aged 46); Okinawa, Japan
- Military career
- Allegiance: United States
- Branch: United States Marine Corps
- Service years: 1917–1945
- Rank: Colonel
- Nickname: "Bob"
- Service number: 0-3825
- Commands: 22nd Marine Regiment; 3rd Defense Battalion
- Conflicts: World War I: Battle of Belleau Wood; Nicaraguan Campaign; Yangtze Patrol; World War II: Attack on Pearl Harbor; Battle of Guadalcanal; Battle of Leyte; Battle of Okinawa †
- Awards: Navy Cross (3); Silver Star; Legion of Merit; Navy and Marine Corps Medal; Purple Heart

Harold Cyrus Roberts (October 1, 1898 – June 18, 1945) was a highly decorated officer in the United States Marine Corps with the rank of colonel. He was the recipient of three Navy Crosses, the United States military's second-highest decoration awarded for valor in combat.

Roberts began his career as a Navy Corpsman attached to 5th Marine Regiment during World War I and earned his first Navy Cross during the Battle of Belleau Wood for evacuation of wounded Marines under heavy machine gun fire. He received his second Navy Cross during the Nicaraguan Campaign in fall 1928, where he distinguished himself while he led several Marine patrols against hostile bandits and the third one for his command of 22nd Marine Regiment during Battle of Okinawa in World War II. Roberts was killed in action by Japanese sniper at the end of Okinawa campaign.

== Early career ==
Harold C. Roberts was born on October 1, 1898, in Buffalo, New York, the son of George Fenn Roberts, M.D. and his wife Nettie Maude. He graduated from the high school and following the United States entry into World War I, he enlisted the United States Navy. Roberts was subsequently ordered to the Naval Station Great Lakes, Illinois, for basic training, which he completed several months later and was sent to the Naval Corpsman School at Fort Sam Houston, Texas.

Roberts was attached to 5th Marine Regiment and embarked for France. He participated in the Battle of Belleau Wood and distinguished himself on the night of June 7, 1918, when as a Pharmacist's Mate Third Class he showed exceptional heroism by volunteering to cross an open field under heavy machine-gun fire to bring in the wounded who were calling for help. For this act of valor, Roberts was decorated with the Navy Cross, the United States military's second-highest decoration awarded for valor in combat. He also received the Silver Star for his later part in the war.

Following the war, Roberts remained in the Navy, but applied for commission in the United States Marine Corps. He was commissioned as a second lieutenant on June 3, 1922, and was ordered to The Basic School at Marine Barracks, Quantico, Virginia, for basic officer training. Roberts then served at Quantico until June 1924, when he was attached to the Marine detachment aboard the battleship USS Pennsylvania. While aboard Pennsylvania he took part in the patrol cruises to Hawaii and to Melbourne, Australia and Wellington, New Zealand.

He was transferred to Marine Corps Base San Diego, California, in August 1926 and upon his promotion to first lieutenant on November 23, 1927, he was temporarily attached to the 3rd Marine Brigade in China. Roberts was transferred to 2nd Marine Brigade in January 1928 and ordered to Nicaragua, where he participated in the jungle patrols against Sandino bandits in Nueva Segovia Department. He distinguished himself during this assignment and was decorated with his second Navy Cross. Roberts also received the Navy and Marine Corps Medal for saving the life of a fellow Marine in March 1928 and the Government of Nicaragua bestowed him with the Presidential Medal of Merit with Diploma.

In July 1929, Roberts returned to the United States and assumed duty at Marine Barracks, Parris Island, South Carolina, where he served until June 1930. He was subsequently attached to the Marine detachment aboard the newly commissioned cruiser USS Houston and sailed for the Far East, where he participated in the patrol cruises off the coast of Shanghai, China.

Following the outbreak of the hostilities between China and Japan, Roberts was transferred to the 4th Marine Regiment in June 1931 and served at Shanghai International Settlement until December 1933, when he returned to the United States. He then served at the headquarters, Department of the Pacific in San Francisco until July 1934, when he was sent to the Marine Corps Schools, Quantico.

Roberts completed the Base Defense Weapons Course there and was promoted to captain on May 31, 1935. He then served at Quantico and was promoted to major on July 1, 1939. He was ordered to Hawaii in April 1940 and joined the 3rd Defense Battalion under Colonel Harry K. Pickett as a battery commander. The Marine defense battalions were special Marine units, which were designated as the defense force of the Pacific naval bases and were placed on Midway Atoll, Wake Island, Johnston Atoll and Palmyra Atoll.

In September 1940, Roberts led approximately a third of 3rd Defense Battalion to Midway and assumed responsibility for the anti-aircraft defense of the atoll. Upon the appointment of Lieutenant Colonel Robert H. Pepper as commanding officer, 3rd Defense Battalion in February 1941, Roberts was appointed his executive officer. The 3rd Defense Battalion was relocated to Hawaii in October 1941.

== World War II ==
=== Pearl Harbor ===
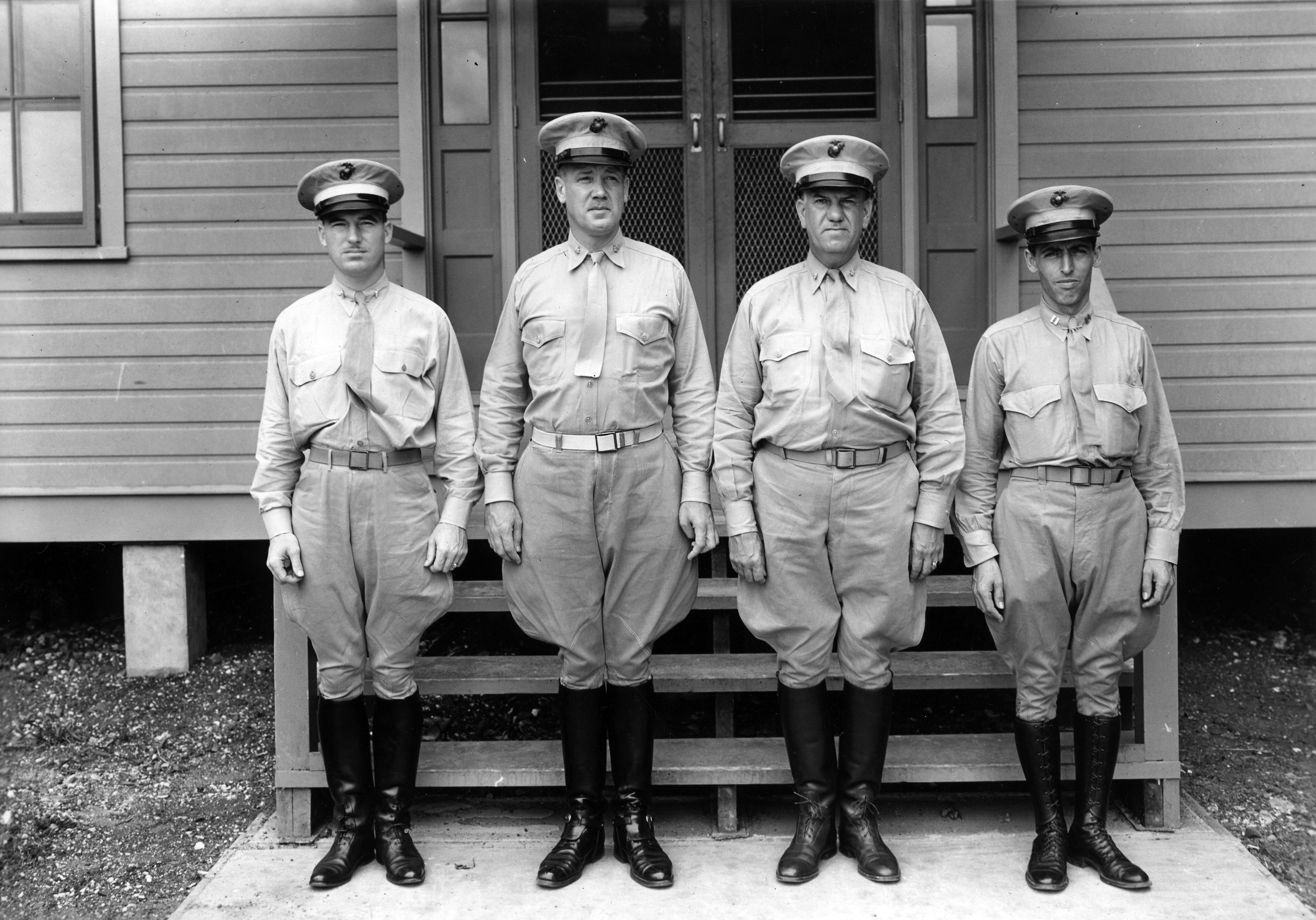
Roberts (second from left) with 3rd Defense Battalion Staff

At the time of Japanese Attack on Pearl Harbor, on December 7, 1941, Roberts served as acting commander of 3rd Defense Battalion in the absence of Colonel Pepper, who was on an observation tour of Higgins Boats near Midway. Roberts was sleeping in his quarters in Honolulu when he was woken up by a telephone call made by the battalion's assistant communication officer, Frederick M. Steinhauser. He was quickly briefed by Steinhauser and jumped into his car with Major Kenneth W. Benner, commanding officer of the battalion's 3-inch antiaircraft group.

They drove through the heavy traffic toward Pearl Harbor, witnessing Japanese planes attacking the Navy ships. Roberts reached the Marine Barracks at Pearl Harbor Navy Yard after a twenty minute trip and began organizing the anti-aircraft defense of his battalion. He directed medical personnel to set up dressing stations at each battalion headquarters; organized the precautions in the temporary wooden barracks, placing extinguishers in the front of them, along with shovels, axes and buckets of sand (the latter to deal with incendiary bombs); hose reel and chemical carts placed near the center hydrant near the mess hall; and all possible containers filled with water for both fighting fires and drinking.

In addition, he ordered cooks and messmen to prepare coffee and fill every other container on hand with water, and organized riflemen in groups of about 16 to sit on the ground with an officer or non-commissioned officer in charge to direct their fire. He also called for runners from all groups in the battalion and established his command post at the parade ground's south corner, and ordered the almost 150 civilians who had shown up looking for ways to help out to report to the machine gun storeroom and fill ammunition belts and clean weapons. Among other actions, he also instructed the battalion sergeant major to be ready to safeguard important papers from the headquarters barracks. Roberts directed anti-aircraft defense and subsequent fire extinguishing and recommended that the entire 3d Defense Battalion be commended for "their initiative, coolness under fire, and the alacrity with which they emplaced their guns."

=== Guadalcanal ===
Roberts and his battalion then reinforced Midway, Johnston and Palmyra atoll garrisons and was promoted to the temporary rank of lieutenant colonel on May 8, 1942. He ultimately embarked for Guadalcanal, Solomon Islands and took part in the Landing at Tulagi on August 7, 1942. The 3rd Defense Battalion successfully hit three enemy ships that had beached themselves to land troops and repulsed 133 bombing attacks by Japanese planes. Roberts then took part in Battle for Henderson Field at the end of October 1942 and his battalion defended Lunga Point against an enemy counterattack from the sea. He was promoted to temporary colonel on October 30, 1942.

The 3rd Defense Battalion departed Guadalcanal in February 1943 and arrived to New Zealand, where it was garrisoned near Masterton. Roberts succeeded Colonel Robert H. Pepper as commanding officer, 3rd Defense Battalion on March 15, 1943, and received Legion of Merit with Combat "V" and Navy Presidential Unit Citation for his service on Guadalcanal.

=== Stateside service and Leyte ===
Roberts returned to the United States in June 1943 and joined the headquarters, Fleet Marine Force, San Diego area. He returned to Pacific area in October 1944 and assumed duty as Chief of Staff of the Artillery, V Amphibious Corps under Brigadier General Thomas E. Bourke. While in this capacity, Roberts took part in the Battle of Leyte in the Philippines.

=== Okinawa ===
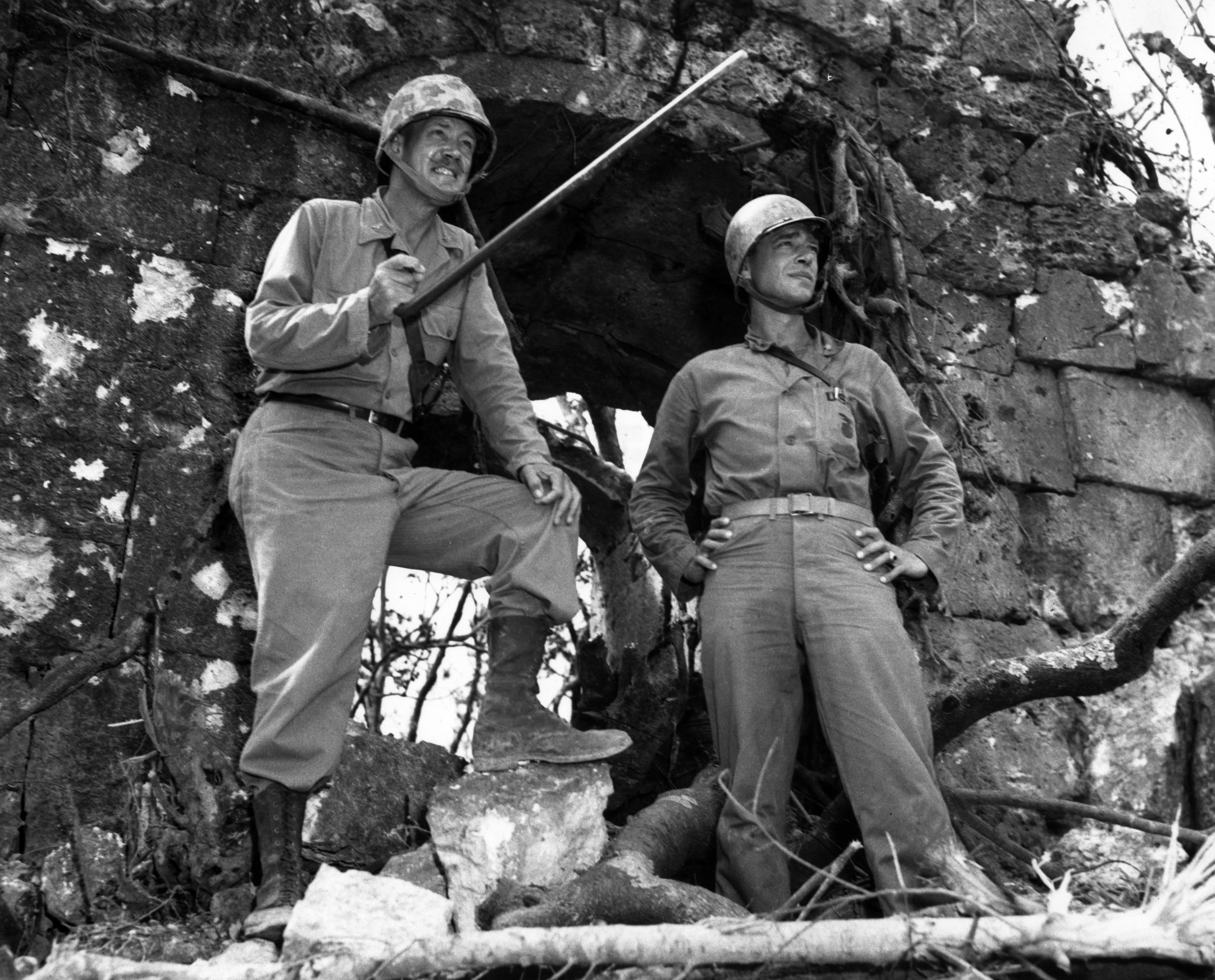
Roberts (left) only few days before his death, with commander of 3rd Battalion Clair W. Shisler. Okinawa, June 1945.

In January 1945, Roberts was ordered back to Guadalcanal, now a large supply and training base, where newly established 6th Marine Division under Major General Lemuel C. Shepherd Jr. conducted intensive training for further combat deployment in Pacific. He was attached to the division staff and took part in the preparations of plans and amphibious training for the Okinawa Campaign.

Roberts spent two months on Guadalcanal and embarked for the staging area at Ulithi, a little atoll in the Caroline Islands at the beginning of March 1945. The Sixth Marine Division went ashore on April 1, 1945, and met heavy Japanese resistance, mainly artillery, mortars, machine guns, and snipers. General Shepherd was not satisfied with the progress of 22nd Marine Regiment under Colonel Merlin F. Schneider.

General Shepherd thought that Schneider, who served in the Pacific area nonstop since June 1942 needed rest and ordered Roberts to relieve him. Roberts succeeded Schneider on May 17, 1945, after a six weeks of heavy fighting and the first thing he did was establishing of his command post immediately behind front lines. He wanted to demonstrate to his men, that their commander was with them on the front line and also wanted better overview of the tactical situation. He led his regiment during the combats near Naha and the capture of Sugar Loaf Hill. For his service at Sugar Loaf Hill, Roberts received his third Navy Cross.

On June 18, 1945, the Twenty-Second Marines were participating in the action of Hill 69 and Roberts had been up forward watching the advance of 2nd Battalion with his executive officer, Lieutenant Colonel August Larson, when a sniper opened fire on them. Roberts was hit in the chest and died a few moments later. Larson assumed command of the regiment.

== Decorations ==
Here is the ribbon bar of Colonel Roberts:

1st Row	Navy Cross with two 5/16" Gold Stars		
2nd Row	Silver Star	Legion of Merit with Combat "V"	Navy and Marine Corps Medal
3rd Row	Purple Heart	Navy Presidential Unit Citation with one star	World War I Victory Medal with four battle clasps
4th Row	Marine Corps Expeditionary Medal	Yangtze Service Medal	Second Nicaraguan Campaign Medal
5th Row	American Defense Service Medal with Base clasp	American Campaign Medal	Asiatic-Pacific Campaign Medal with four 3/16" service stars
6th Row	World War II Victory Medal	Nicaraguan Presidential Order of Merit with Gold star	Philippine Liberation Medal

=== First Navy Cross citation ===
Citation:

The President of the United States of America takes pleasure in presenting the Navy Cross to Pharmacist's Mate Third Class Harold C. Roberts (NSN: 0-3825), United States Navy, for extraordinary heroism while serving as a Corpsman attached to the Fifth Regiment (Marines), 2d Division, American Expeditionary Forces, in action at the front on the night of 7 June 1918. Pharmacist's Mate Third Class Roberts showed exceptional heroism by volunteering to cross an open field under heavy machine-gun fire to bring in the wounded who were calling for help.

=== Second Navy Cross citation ===
Citation:

The President of the United States of America takes pleasure in presenting a Gold Star in lieu of a Second Award of the Navy Cross to Captain Harold C. Roberts (MCSN: 0-3825), United States Marine Corps, for distinguished service in the line of his profession while acting as second in command of the Coco River Expedition in Nuevo Segovia, Nicaragua, between 4 September 1928 and 10 November 1928. Captain Roberts displayed great fortitude and marked ability as a leader in surmounting the countless obstacles which constantly jeopardized the lives and limbs of every member of the command and thereby materially assisted in successfully surmounting twenty-four extremely difficult and dangerous rapids.

=== Third Navy Cross citation ===
Citation:

The President of the United States of America takes pride in presenting a Second Gold Star in lieu of a Third Award of the Navy Cross (Posthumously) to Colonel Harold C. Roberts (MCSN: 0-3825), United States Marine Corps, for extraordinary heroism as commanding Officer of the Twenty-Second Marines, SIXTH Marine Division, in action against enemy Japanese forces on Okinawa, Ryukyu Islands, 16 June 1945. Preparing for the assault on an enemy-held ridge in which his regiment was making the main effort of a Marine Division, Colonel Roberts established his observation post on a hill about one-half mile from the objective, whence he could see the entire regimental zone of action. When by-passed Japanese pockets of resistance on the hill became active and subjected the observation post to constant, intense mortar, grenade, and small-arms fire, he courageously refused to leave his post but continued at the risk of his life to direct the assault and, by his outstanding leadership and superb coordination and employment of the combat units under his control, was largely responsible for the rapid seizure of the objective by his regiment. While observing the final overpowering of the enemy resistance, he was mortally wounded by hostile rifle fire. His aggressiveness and brilliant combat tactics were major factors in the successful operation of the division, and reflect the highest credit upon Colonel Roberts and the United States Naval Service. He gallantly gave his life for his country.

== See also ==
- Marine defense battalions
- Battle of Okinawa

Military offices
Preceded by Merlin F. Schneider	Commanding Officer, 22nd Marine Regiment; May 17, 1945 – June 18, 1945	Succeeded by August Larson
Preceded by Robert H. Pepper	Commanding Officer, 3rd Defense Battalion; March 15, 1943 – May 14, 1943	Succeeded by Unit redesignated
