= 13th Antiaircraft Artillery Battalion =

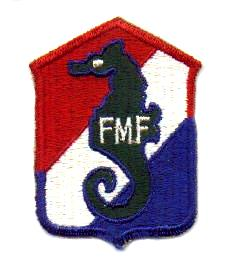
- 13th Defense Battalion Insignia
- Active: 25 Sep 1942 – 17 Sep 1944
- Country: United States of America
- Branch: United States Marine Corps
- Type: Air Defense/Coastal Defense
- Size: ~1100 men
- Engagements: World War II

Commanders
- Current commander: N/A

The 13th Antiaircraft Artillery Battalion (13th AAA Bn) was a United States Marine Corps antiaircraft unit that served during World War II. Formed in 1942 as the 13th Defense Battalion, its original mission was to provide air and coastal defense for advanced naval bases. During the war the battalion defended Guantanamo Bay, Cuba and Hawaii. The battalion was the first Defense/AAA Battalion to be decommissioned during the war officially folding its flag on September 7, 1944.

== History ==
=== Organization ===
The 13th Defense Battalion was commissioned on September 25, 1942 at Guantanamo Bay Naval Base, Cuba. The battalion's Headquarters and Service Battery was formed by the re-designation of the Marine Barracks, Naval Operating Base, Guantanamo Bay. The rest of the battalion's personnel were later joined from training units in North Carolina. The battalion remained at Guantanamo Bay. Cuba providing air and coastal defense until March 5, 1944 when it embarked on the SS George Washington bound for the United States. The battalion arrived in New Orleans on March 11, 1944 with follow on travel to Marine Corps Base Camp Lejeune, North Carolina.

Beginning in 1944 the Marine Corps removed coastal artillery from the defense battalions in order to form additional heavy artillery units for the Fleet Marine Force. Because of the divestiture of the coastal defense mission, the battalion was re-designated as the 13th Antiaircraft Artillery Battalion on April 15, 1944. In July 1944 the battalion travelled to the West Coase and sailed for Pearl Harbor, arriving on August 14, 1944. The 13th Antiaircraft Artillery Battalion was decommissioned on September 7, 1944 making it the first of the Defense/AAA Battalions to be decommissioned.

== Unit awards ==
A unit citation or commendation is an award bestowed upon an organization for the action cited. Members of the unit who participated in said actions are allowed to wear on their uniforms the awarded unit citation. The 13th Antiaircraft Artillery Battalion has been presented with the following awards:

Streamer	Award	Year(s)	Additional Info
	World War II Victory Streamer	1941–1945	

== See also ==
- Marine Defense Battalions
- List of United States Marine Corps aviation support units
