= 4th Antiaircraft Artillery Battalion =

Antiaircraft unit in the US Marine Corps

- Active: 1 Mar 1940 – 9 Jun 1945
- Country: United States of America
- Branch: United States Marine Corps
- Type: Air Defense/Coastal Defense
- Size: ~1100 men
- Part of: III Marine Amphibious Corps
- Engagements: World War II: Attack on Pearl Harbor; Battle of Vella Lavella

Commanders
- Current commander: N/A
- Notable commanders: George F. Good Jr. William H. Rupertus

The 4th Antiaircraft Artillery Battalion (4th AAA Bn) was a United States Marine Corps antiaircraft unit that served during World War II. Formed in 1940 as the 4th Defense Battalion, its original mission was providing air and coastal defense of advanced naval bases. It was one of first five defense battalions deployed in support of the color-coded war plans that called for the defense of Hawaii and other outlying United States possessions in the Pacific Ocean. These five battalions were nicknamed the "Rainbow Five." During the war the battalion took part in combat operations during the attack on Pearl Harbor and at Vella Lavella. The battalion was decommissioned on 9 June 1945 before the end of the war.

== History ==
=== Formation, Gitmo and Pearl Harbor ===
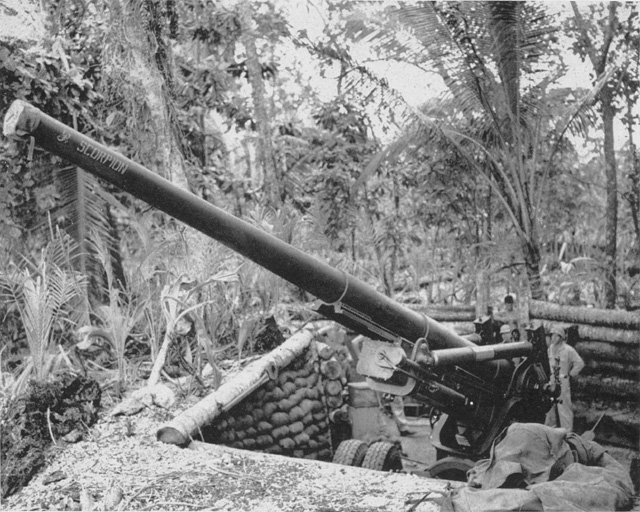
155 mm Long Tom gun "Scorpion" of the 4th Marine Defense Battalion at Barakoma Airfield on Vella Lavella in the South Pacific.

The 4th Antiaircraft Artillery Battalion was commissioned on February 1, 1940, at Marine Corps Recruit Depot Parris Island, South Carolina. The original manpower for the battalion came from a cadre from the 3rd Defense Battalion. The battalion departed the United States in February 1941 bound for Guantanamo Bay, Cuba. Upon arrival they immediately established camp at the Deer Point area of the base. The unit did not stay in Cuba long and in October 1941 it boarded ships headed for Hawaii. The battalion arrived at Pearl Harbor on 1 December 1941 and was present for the attack on Pearl Harbor six days later. Although the battalion did not have any heavy guns operational during the attack it was able to get antiaircraft machine guns operational against Japanese aircraft. On December 13 the battalion began manning air defense positions around Pearl Harbor. At the same time that portions of the battalion were manning those new antiaircraft positions a large portion of the battalion was loading onto the USS Tangier (AV-8) as part of the relief force for the garrison on Wake Island. The ship was loaded by December 13 however it was unable to leave until December 16 because it had to wait for the USS Saratoga (CV-3) to refuel. The relief expedition did not make it to Wake Island in time and was instead diverted to Midway. 4th Defense Battalion units at Pearl continued to man their positions until February 23, 1942, when they were relieved in order to prepare for movement to the South Pacific.

=== Efate ===
The 4th Defense Battalion departed Pearl Harbor March 15, 1942, and on March 29 landed at Efate in the New Hebrides. The battalion provided air defense coverage for the island and endured a significant malaria epidemic during its first few months ashore. In July 1942, the battalion provided a detachment, alongside Marine Aircraft Group 21 to protect the newly constructed airfield at Espiritu Santo helping to ensure the lines of communication between Hawaii and Australia remained open prior to the allied landings on Guadalcanal. In March 1943 the battalion departed Efate and sailed for New Zealand to rest and conduct additional training. The battalion departed New Zealand in July 1943 and arrived at Guadalcanal on 30 July 1943. During this time the battalion conducted additional preparations for upcoming operations in New Georgia.

=== Vella Lavella and re-designation ===
The 4th Defense Battalion came ashore on D-Day during the assault on Vella Lavella and established positions near Barakoma Airfield. The battalion claimed five enemy airplanes shot down on the first day of the battle. Enemy air raids came frequently after the initial assault however they soon declined as enemy losses mounted. Between 15 August and 6 October 1943, the 4th Defense Battalion claimed to shootdown 42 Japanese aircraft during 121 total air raids.

As the war progressed, the Marine Corps removed coastal artillery from the defense battalions in order to form additional heavy artillery units for the Fleet Marine Force. Because of the divestiture of the coastal defense mission, the battalion was re-designated as the 4th Antiaircraft Artillery Battalion on 15 May 1944. All elements of the 4th AAA Battalion were back on Guadalcanal by early July 1944.

=== Guadalcanal, Peleliu and decommissioning ===
The battalion remained on Guadalcanal until September 1944 when it was divided into a forward and rear echelon. The rear echelon remained on Guadalcanal while the forward echelon eventually arrived at the Kossol Roads on 25 October 1944 in order to assist the 12th Antiaircraft Artillery Battalion with defense of the Palau Islands. During this time they were under the operational control of the Army's 81st Infantry Division as the area ground defense commander for Peleliu.

On 27 February 1945, two 90mm batteries, one 20mm battery and a searchlight battery that were part of the rear echelon on Guadalcanal were disbanded. The 2nd platoon of the Searchlight Battery still on Saipan was maintained. On 20 April 1945 the battalion was relieved of its mission on Peleliu. The battalions 2d Platoon Searchlight Battery on Saipan was disbanded on 5 May 1945. During April/May 1945 the remainder of the forward and rear echelons of the battalion were consolidated on Guam. On 9 June 1945 the 4th Antiaircraft Artillery Battalion was decommissioned.

== Unit awards ==
A unit citation or commendation is an award bestowed upon an organization for the action cited. Members of the unit who participated in said actions are allowed to wear on their uniforms the awarded unit citation. The 4th Antiaircraft Artillery Battalion has been presented with the following awards:

Streamer	Award	Year(s)	Additional Info
	Asiatic-Pacific Campaign Streamer with two Bronze Stars		Pearl Harbor, Vella Lavella
	World War II Victory Streamer	1941–1945	Pacific War

== See also ==
- Marine Defense Battalions
- List of United States Marine Corps aviation support units
