= 10th Antiaircraft Artillery Battalion =

United States Marine Corps WWII antiaircraft unit

- Active: June 1, 1942 – November 25, 1944
- Country: United States of America
- Branch: United States Marine Corps
- Type: Air Defense/Coastal Defense
- Size: ~1,100 men
- Engagements: World War II; Solomon Islands campaign Battle of Kwajalein

Commanders
- Current commander: N/A
- Notable commanders: Robert Blake (USMC)

The 10th Antiaircraft Artillery Battalion (10th AAA Bn) was a United States Marine Corps antiaircraft unit that served during World War II. Formed in 1942 as the 10th Defense Battalion, its original mission was to provide air and coastal defense for advanced naval bases. During the war the battalion took part in combat operations in the Russell Islands and at the Eniwetok. The battalion's tank platoon also saw extensive action on New Georgia and Arundel Island. The battalion was decommissioned before the end of the war on 25 November 1944.

== History ==
=== Organization ===
The 10th Defense Battalion was commissioned on June 1, 1942, at Marine Corps Base San Diego, California. Lieutenant Colonel Robert Blake was the battalion's first commanding officer. At commissioning the battalion consisted of the following elements:

- H&S Battery
- 155mm Artillery Group
- 90mm AA Group
- Special Weapons Group

=== Russell Islands ===
On August 21, 1942, the battalion embarked on the SS Day Star and sailed for the Territory of Hawaii. They arrived at Pearl Harbor on August 31, 1942, and proceeded to establish themselves at nearby Camp Catlin. Not long for Hawaii, the battalion departed on February 6 on board the USS Pinkney and the SS Robin Wentley. After a layover in Espiritu Santo they arrived at the Florida Islands on February 24, 1943. The first echelon of the battalion departed on March 14 for the Russell Islands. The remainder of the battalion arrived by March 28, 1943. "A" Battery was located on Pavuvu while "B" Battery was stationed on Mbanika. Originally the battalion established an SCR-270 radar on a mountain on Mbanika. Problems supplying the radar and moisture caused by cloud cover caused it to be moved to a hill on the northeast portion of the island. During May and June 1943, antiaircraft guns of the 10th Defense Battalion engaged numerous Japanese air raids against the newly constructed airfield on Banika. During this time the Commanding Officer of the 10th Defense Battalion also assumed the responsibilities as the Antiaircraft Commander, Russell Islands and Commander Marine Defense Group Solomons.

During July 1943, M3A1 Stuart Light Tanks of the 10th Defense Battalion were assigned to support the 43rd Infantry Division securing Munda Point on New Georgia. After Munda, the tank section was transported via landing craft to Arundel Island where they again provided fire support for the 43rd Infantry during their seizure of the island. On December 30, 1943, the US Army's 13th Antiaircraft Group assumed responsibility for air and coastal defense of the Russell Island.

=== Eniwetok ===
From February 1–7 the battalion loaded on board the SS William H. Allen and the SS Santa Cruz. The ships departed the Russell Islands on February 10 and arrived at Tarawa, where it received verbal orders to proceed to Kwajalein Atoll. Upon arrival off the coast of Kwajalein on February 18 the battalion received orders to organize a 500-man infantry unit (10th Defense Battalion Provisional Landing Force). It was going to serve as the V Amphibious Corps reserve for the upcoming assault on the atoll. The 10th did not land on D-Day as Marines from the 22nd Marine Regiment accomplished the mission on February 22. The battalion went ashore on Eniwetok on February 24 and began set up air and coastal defense guns. It assumed responsibility for air defense of Eniwetok along with Air Warning Squadron 1 whose Air Defense Control Center provided early warning radar and Ground-controlled interception for fighters.

=== Reorganization, Hawaii and decommissioning ===
As the war progressed, the Marine Corps removed coastal artillery from the defense battalions in order to form additional heavy artillery units for the Fleet Marine Force. Because of the divestiture of the coastal defense mission, the battalion was re-designated as the 10th Antiaircraft Artillery Battalion on May 31, 1944. The seacoast artillery section departed Eniwetok on August 29 sailing for Kauai, Hawaii. Shortly thereafter on September 16 the 51st Defense Battalion assumed responsibility for defense of Eniwetok and Parry Islands. The 10th Antiaircraft Artillery Battalion departed the Marshall Islands on September 17 and arrived in Kauai on September 27, 1944. The 10th Antiaircraft Artillery Battalion was decommissioned on November 25, 1944, by authority of Fleet Marine Force, Pacific Special Order Number 104-44.

== Unit awards ==
A unit citation or commendation is an award bestowed upon an organization for the action cited. Members of the unit who participated in said actions are allowed to wear on their uniforms the awarded unit citation. The 10th Antiaircraft Artillery Battalion has been presented with the following awards:

Streamer	Award	Year(s)	Additional Info
	Asiatic-Pacific Campaign Streamer with three Bronze Stars		Solomon Islands, Eniwetok
	World War II Victory Streamer	1941–1945	Pacific War

== See also ==
- Marine Defense Battalions
- List of United States Marine Corps aviation support units
