= Thomas E. Bourke =

American Marine Corps general

Thomas Eugene Bourke
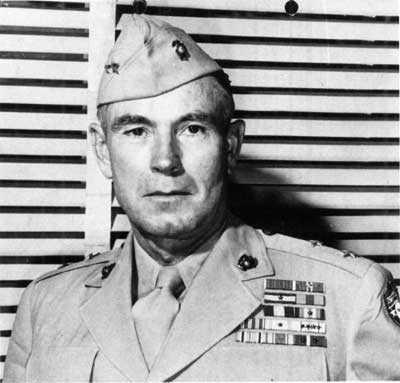
- Thomas E. Bourke, USMC
- Born: May 5, 1896; Robinson, Maryland, U.S.
- Died: January 9, 1978 (aged 81); Santa Clara, California, U.S.
- Burial place: Arlington National Cemetery
- Military career
- Allegiance: United States of America
- Branch: Maryland National Guard; United States Marine Corps
- Service years: 1917–1946
- Rank: Lieutenant general
- Service number: 0-96
- Commands: 5th Marine Division; 10th Marine Regiment; Inspector General of FMFPac
- Conflicts: Pancho Villa Expedition; World War I Nicaraguan Campaign; World War II: Battle of Guadalcanal; Battle of Tarawa; Battle of Saipan; Battle of Leyte
- Awards: Legion of Merit; Bronze Star (2)

Thomas Eugene Bourke (May 5, 1896 – January 9, 1978) was a United States Marine Corps general who, during World War II, commanded Marine artillery units at the Battle of Guadalcanal, Tarawa and Leyte. At the end of World War II, he commanded the 5th Marine Division in the occupation of Japan, and the Fleet Marine Force, Pacific.

== Biography ==
Bourke was born on May 5, 1896, in Robinson, Maryland, and later attended high school in Boonsboro, Maryland. He later attended the St. John's College, Annapolis, Maryland, and graduated with Bachelor of Arts degree. Following his graduation, Bourke served with the Maryland National Guard along the Mexican border, before he accepted the commission as second lieutenant in the Marine Corps on February 5, 1917.

While en route to Santo Domingo for his first tour, he and 50 recruits were diverted to St. Croix, becoming the first U.S. troops to land on what had just become the American Virgin Islands.

Post-World War I tours included service at Quantico, Parris Island, San Diego, and Headquarters Marine Corps. He also served at Pearl Harbor; was commanding officer of the Legation Guard in Managua, Nicaragua; saw sea duty on board the battleship USS West Virginia (BB-48); and commanded the 10th Marine Regiment.

Following the Guadalcanal and Tarawa campaigns, General Bourke was assigned as the V Amphibious Corps artillery officer for the invasion of Saipan. He next trained combined Army-Marine artillery units for the XXIV Army Corps, then preparing for the Leyte operation. With Leyte secured, he assumed command of the 5th Marine Division which was planning for the invasion of Japan.

After the war's sudden end, the division landed at Sasebo, Kyūshū, and assumed occupation duties. With disbandment of the 5th Marine Division, General Bourke became deputy commander and inspector general of Fleet Marine Force Pacific. Bourke retired from the Marine Corps in 1946 with a rank of lieutenant general.

Bourke died on January 9, 1978. He is buried in Arlington National Cemetery.

== Awards ==

1st row	Legion of Merit with Combat "V"			
2nd row	Bronze Star with one 5/16" gold star	Navy Presidential Unit Citation with one star	Marine Corps Expeditionary Medal	Mexican Border Service Medal
3rd row	World War I Victory Medal with one clasp	Second Nicaraguan Campaign Medal	American Defense Service Medal with Fleet clasp	American Campaign Medal
4th row	Asiatic-Pacific Campaign Medal with four 3/16 inch service stars	World War II Victory Medal	Navy Occupation Service Medal	Philippine Liberation Medal with two stars
