= Arundel Island =

Island in Solomon Islands

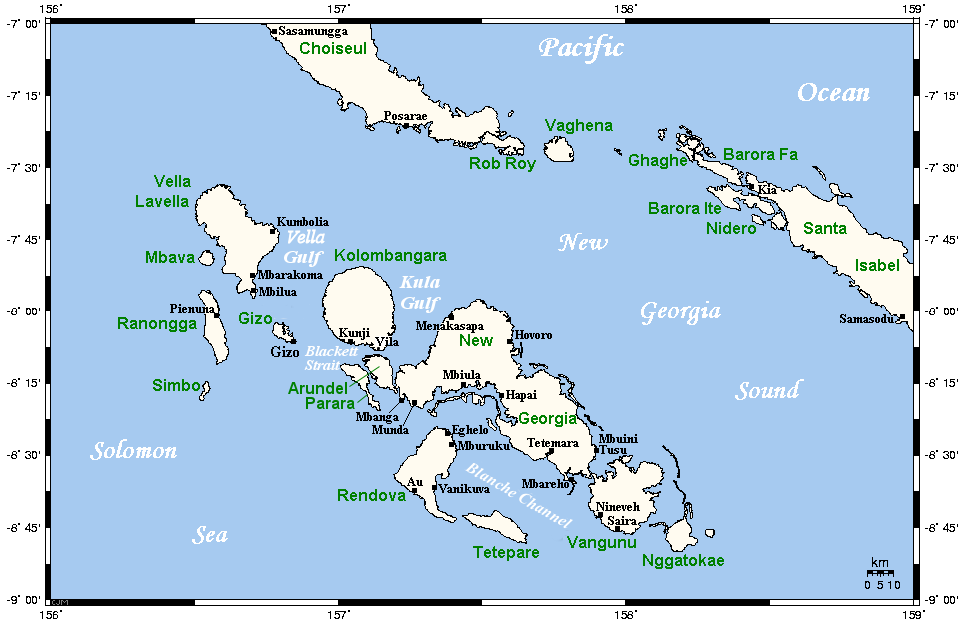
Location of the island in the New Georgia Island Group

Arundel Island is an island of the New Georgia Islands archipelago in the Western Province of Solomon Islands. Its indigenous names are Kohinggo and Ndokulu.

== Geography ==
Arundel Island is located between Kolombangara and New Georgia islands, in the Western Province, at 8°12′S 157°8′E. It is separated from Kolombangara by Blackett Strait. To the west lies Vonavona Island, and to northwest lies Ferguson Passage.

Round Hill, with a height of 250 feet or 76 meters, is located in the southern part of the island.

== Wartime history ==
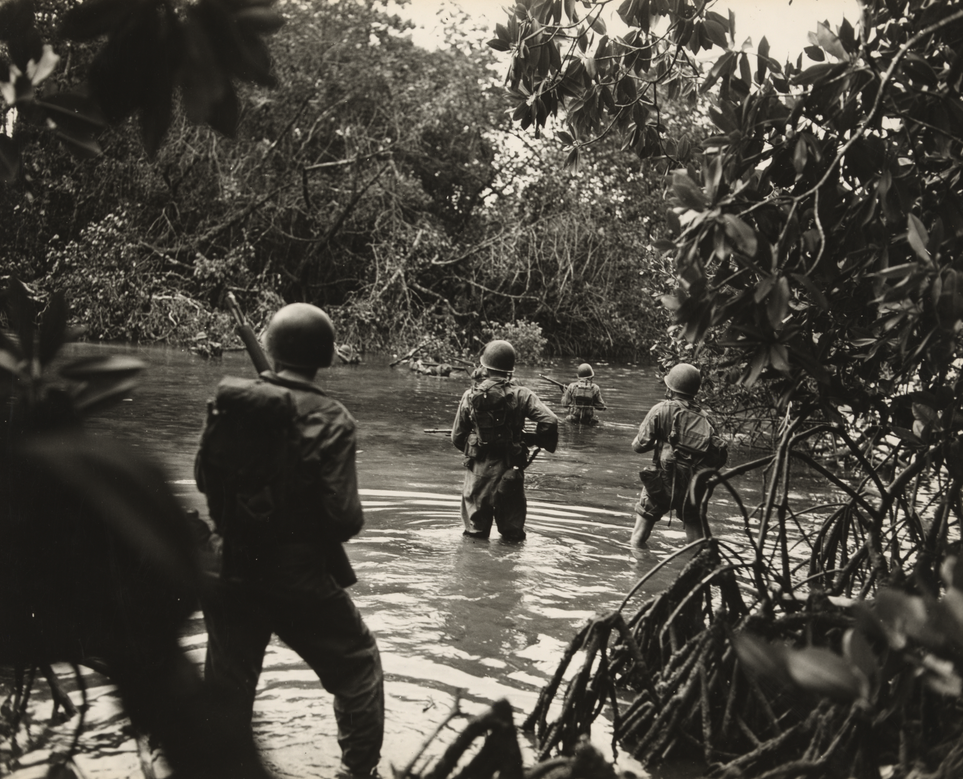
Operations Against the Japanese on Arundel and Sagekarsa Islands by John Bushemi, 1943.

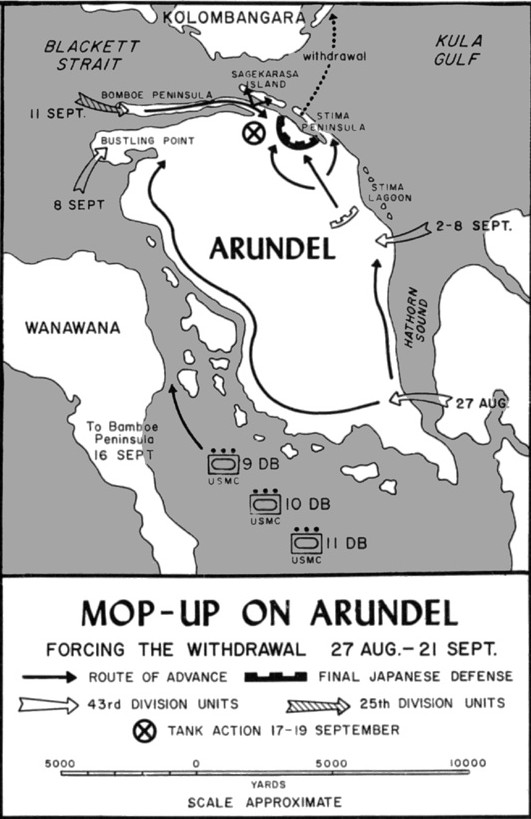
Military operations on Arundel during World War II

On August 27, 1943, the island was attacked by American forces. The Japanese lost 345 killed and 500 wounded during the fighting for the island. Eventually, General Sasaki withdrew from Arundel and Gizo on September 20–21, 1943. Kolombangara had already been liberated by the American invasion of Vella Lavella, and, at the end of September, the Japanese began to evacuate their last base in the New Georgia islands.
