= 51st Defense Battalion =

World War II American coastal defense unit

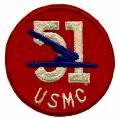
- Insignia for the 51st Defense Battalion
- Active: Aug 18, 1942 – Jan 31, 1946
- Country: United States of America
- Branch: United States Marine Corps
- Type: Air Defense/Coastal Defense
- Size: ~1100 men
- Engagements: World War II

The 51st Defense Battalion was an antiaircraft and coastal defense unit in the United States Marine Corps that served during World War II. The battalion was originally formed in August 1942 and was the first African American unit in the Marine Corps. Its original mission was to provide air and coastal defense for advanced naval bases. During the war the battalion served in the Ellice and Marshall Islands, in the Pacific Theater. The 51st returned to Marine Corps Base Camp Lejeune, North Carolina after the war and was decommissioned on January 31, 1946. To date, no other Marine Corps battalion has carried the lineage and honors of the 51st Defense Battalion.

== History ==
=== Background ===
There was little desire amongst Marine Corps (USMC) senior leadership to integrate African Americans prior to World War II. In April 1941, Commandant of the Marine Corps Thomas Holcomb stated that African Americans had no right to serve as Marines. He went on to say that, "If it were a question of having a Marine Corps of 5,000 whites or 250,000 Negroes, I would rather have the whites."

On June 25, 1941, President Franklin D. Roosevelt issued Executive Order 8802, mandating the elimination of racial discrimination from federal departments, agencies, the military, and private defense contractors. Secretary of the Navy Frank Knox was then directed by the President to accept black recruits into the Navy and Marine Corps. In February 1942, the Marine Corps agreed to accept African American recruits for the first time since the Revolutionary War. In order to comply with the Presidential directive, yet still maintain strict racial segregation, Lieutenant General Holcomb proposed the establishment of an all-black Defense Battalion. To initially make this battalion self-supporting so that it could train in isolation and deploy independently, Holcomb saw to it that a rifle company, special weapons platoons, and light tank platoon were added.

On June 1, 1941, in Oklahoma City, Oklahoma, at 12:01 a.m, Alfred Masters and George O. Thompson were the first African Americans to be enlisted into the Marine Corps since the Revolutionary War. Although the initial group of black USMC recruits was admitted beginning June 1, 1942, they were not immediately trained because separate, segregated facilities had not been completed. Black volunteers began their basic training in August at Montford Point in North Carolina, a satellite base to Marine Barracks, New River, later called Marine Corps Base Camp Lejeune. The first black recruit to arrive in camp was Howard P. Perry on August 26, followed that day by 12 others.

=== Organization ===
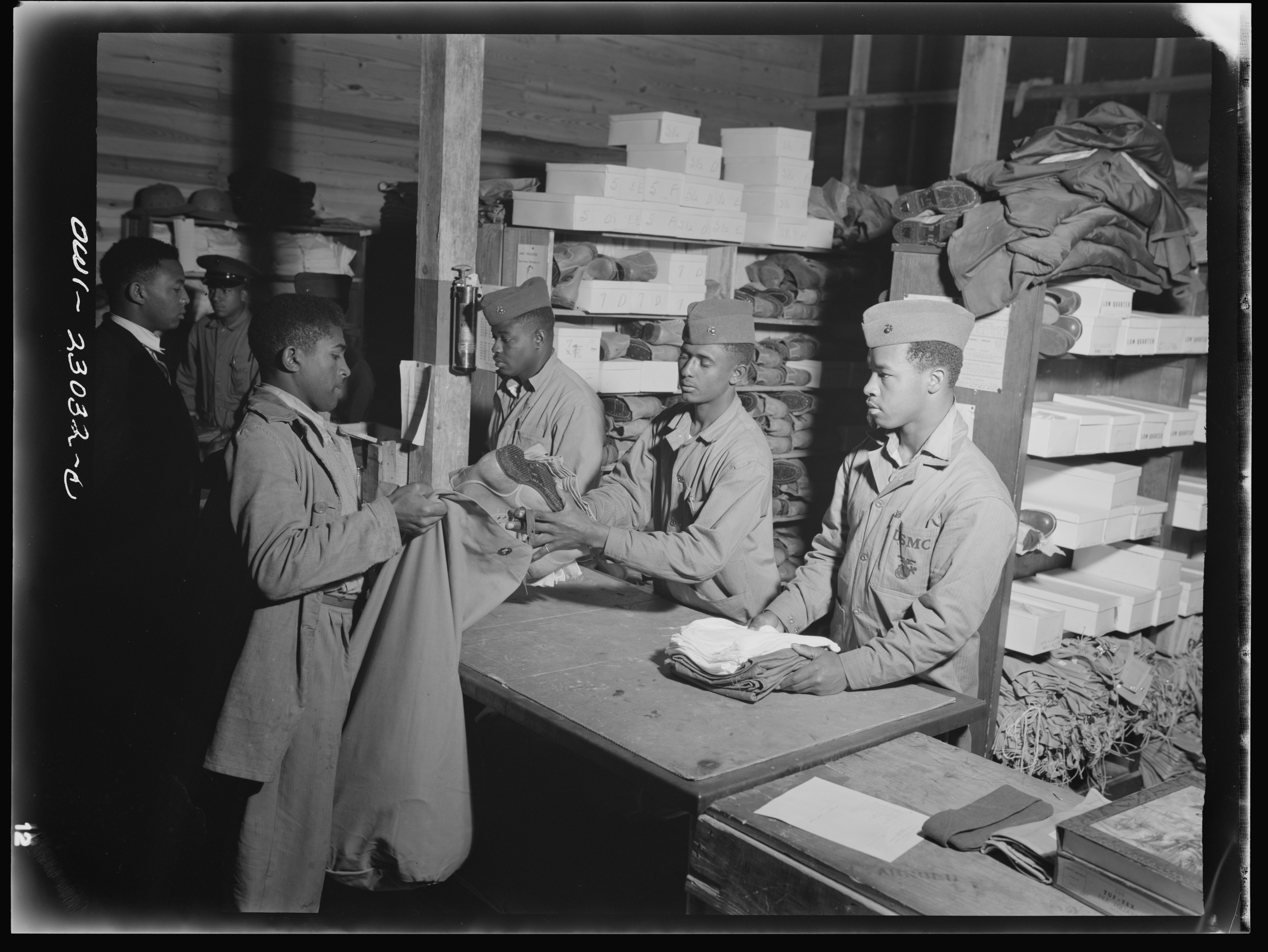
Marines from the 51st Defense Battalion get gear issued in March 1943.

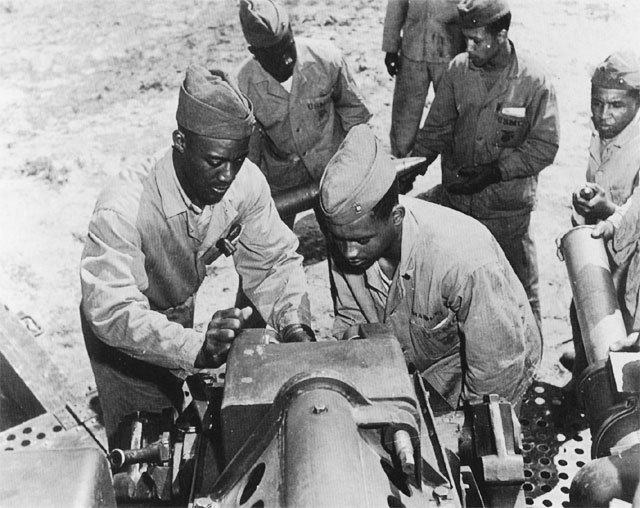
Marines of the 51st Defense Battalion are shown here in training at Montford Point, Camp Lejeune, before their deployment to the Pacific War.

Headquarters and Services Battery of the 51st Composite Defense Battalion was commissioned August 18, 1942, at the Montford Point Camp near Marine Corps Base Camp Lejeune, North Carolina. The battalion's first commanding officer, Colonel Samuel A. Woods Jr., also served as the commander of the segregated camp at Montford Point. Because black recruits were not able to train alongside white recruits at the Marine Corps Recruit Depots, recruit training for incoming black recruits had to be established and conducted by the 51st Defense Battalion. To assist with the training, the Marine Corps detailed 23 white officers and 90 white enlisted men. The 90 white enlisted men became known as the Special Enlisted Staff and served as the first drill instructors, administration clerks and mechanics until black Marines could be trained to fill those roles.

The first large batch graduated from recruit training at the end of November 1942, and during December the other elements of the battalion began to organize. The first black non-commissioned officers were promoted in January 1943, with the first black drill instructors following in February. The white drill instructors were all replaced by black instructors by April 1943.

In May 1943, the new commanding officer of the 51st, LtCol Floyd Stephenson, recommended that the battalion shed the additional infantry company and special weapons platoons that differentiated it from a standard defense battalion. Headquarters Marine Corps approved these changes and on June 7, 1943, that battalion dropped the "composite" in its moniker. The summer and fall of 1943 saw an intensive training program undertaken in preparation for deployment overseas.

=== Ellice Islands ===
The 51st Defense Battalion departed Montford Point on January 20, 1944, headed for the west coast of the United States. Arriving in San Diego, California, the battalion billeted at Camp Elliott until it boarded the SS Meteor on February 11 to sail west. While sailing the battalion was separated into two detachments. One detachment was tasked with defending Nanumea while the rest of the battalion was tasked to defend Funafuti and Nukufetau. On February 27, 1944, the battalion landed on Funafuti in the Ellice Islands replacing the 7th Defense Battalion. On Nukufetau, the 51st replaced the 2d Airdrome Battalion that had been there since August 1943. Another detachment was also sent to Nanumea. The battalion continued to train while serving in the Ellice Islands but did not see any combat operations.

In July 1944, the Marine Corps published a new Table of organization and equipment for the defense battalions that removed their coastal artillery in order to form additional heavy artillery units for the Fleet Marine Force. With the divestiture of the coastal defense mission, most of the defense battalions were re-designated as antiaircraft battalions. The 6th, 51st, and 52nd were the only three units to retain the Defense Battalion moniker for the remainder of the war. The 51st Defense Battalion officially decommissioned its Seacoast Artillery Group on July 15, 1944.

=== Eniwetok Atoll ===
On September 8, 1944, the battalion departed the Funafuti atoll bound for the Eniwetok Atoll on board the US Army transport ship Kota Agoeng. Arriving Eniwetok on September 14, the battalion officially replaced elements of the 10th Antiaircraft Artillery Battalion on September 17 when it assumed defensive positions on Eniwetok, Engebi, Parry, and Porky Islands. The battalion remained on Eniwetok for the remainder of the war and did not participate in any combat operations. On June 12, 1945, the 51st carved out a Composite Group consisting of one 90mm antiaircraft battery, a 40mm platoon, and four searchlight batteries for additional duty on Kwajalein. They arrived on June 17 and remained there for the rest of the war.

=== After the War ===
In mid-November 1945, the 51st had been overseas for just short of two years when elements of the 52nd Defense battalion replaced them. The detachment on Kwajalein departed for Pearl Harbor on November 21 on board the USS Wyandot (AKA-92) while the main body on Eniwetok departed on November 22 on board the USS Sabik (AK-121) bound for San Diego, California. The 51st returned to the United States in late November 1945 arriving back at Montford Point on December 26. The majority of the battalion was immediately placed on leave and on January 31, 1946, the 51st Defense Battalion was officially decommissioned.

== Commanding Officers ==
The following officers served as Commanding Officer of the 51st Defense Battalion:

- Col Samuel A. Woods Jr. - August 18, 1942 - March, 1943
- LtCol William B. Onley - March 1943 - April 20, 1943
- LtCol Floyd A. Stephenson - April 21, 1943 - January 1944
- LtCol Curtis D. LeGette - January 1944 - December 12, 1944
- LtCol Gould P. Groves - December 13, 1944 - January 7, 1946
- 2ndLt Charles H. Knowlton Jr. - January 8, 1946 - January 31, 1946.

== Notable former members ==
- Frederick C. Branch – first African-American officer in the United States Marine Corps. He was commissioned as a reserve officer.
- John E. Rudder – first African American to receive a regular commission in the United States Marine Corps.

== Gallery ==
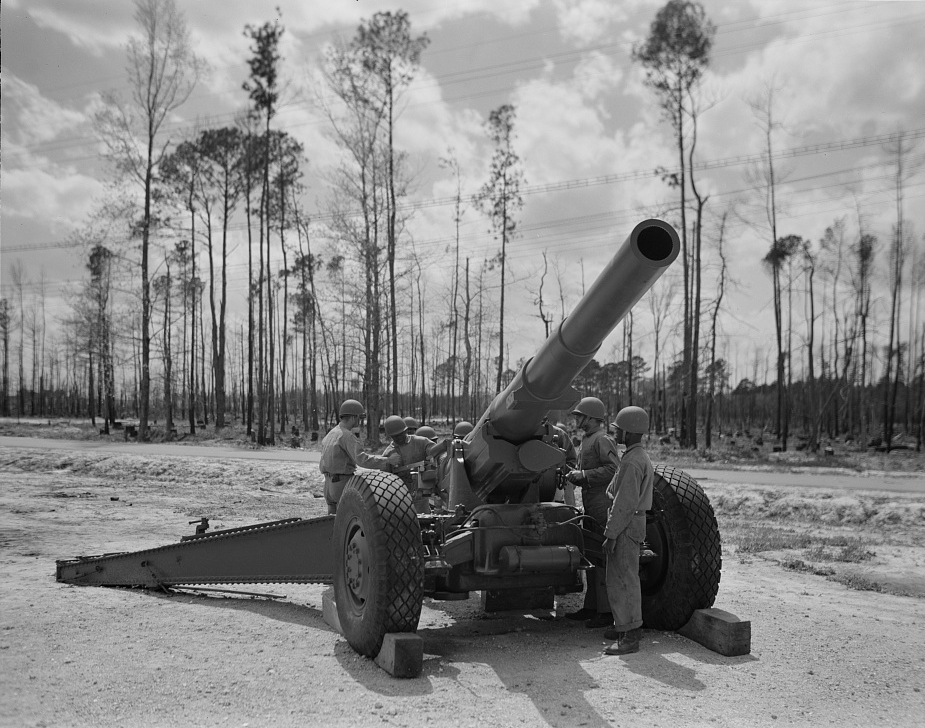
Marines of the 51st Composite Defense Battalion at Montford Point train on a 155mm coastal defense gun.

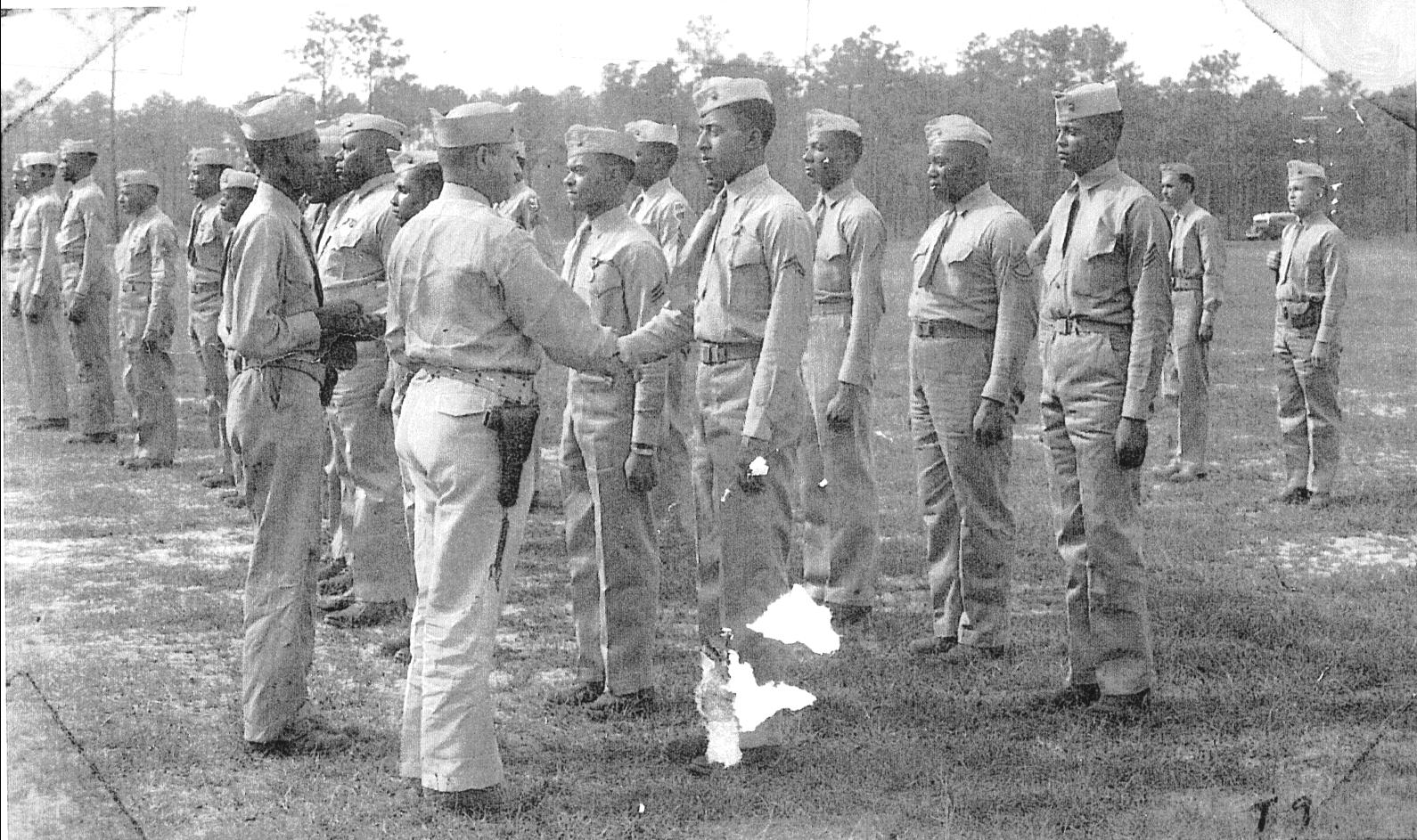
Lieutenant Colonel Frazier, Commanding Officer, Montford Point Camp, presents the World War II Victory Medal to members of the Montford Point Camp, and the 51st, and 52nd Defense Battalions.

== Unit awards ==
A unit citation or commendation is an award bestowed upon an organization for the action cited. Members of the unit who participated in said actions are allowed to wear on their uniforms the awarded unit citation. The 51st Defense Battalion has been presented with the following awards:

Streamer	Award	Year(s)	Additional Info
	World War II Victory Streamer	1941–1945	Pacific War

== See also ==
- 761st Tank Battalion (United States)
- Marine Defense Battalions
- Montford Point Marine Association
- List of United States Marine Corps aviation support units
