= Desegregation in the United States Marine Corps =

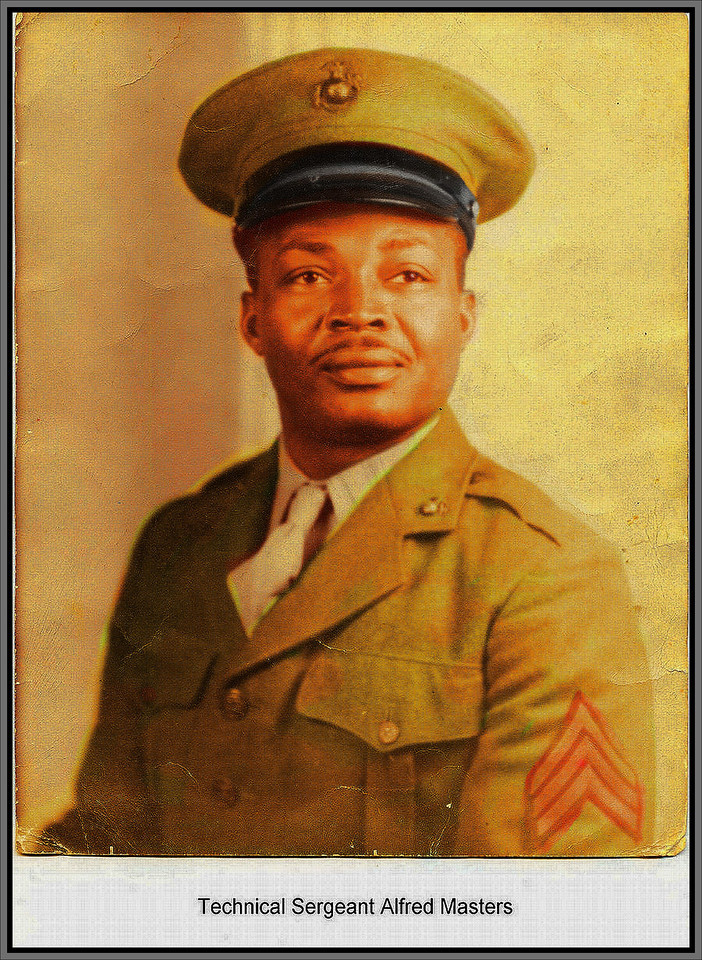
Alfred Masters, the first Black Marine since the Revolutionary War, enlisted during WWII, June 1, 1942.

The United States Marine Corps (USMC) is a desegregated force, made up of troops of all races working and fighting alongside each other. In 1776 and 1777, a dozen African American Marines served in the American Revolutionary War, but from 1798 to 1942, the USMC followed a racially discriminatory policy of denying African Americans the opportunity to serve as Marines. For more than 140 years, the Marines recruited primarily European Americans, Hispanic and Latino Americans, along with a few Asian Americans.

The USMC opened its doors to Blacks in June 1942, with the acceptance of African Americans as recruits in segregated all-Black units. Other races were accepted somewhat more easily, joining White Marine units. For the next few decades, the incorporation of Black troops was not widely accepted within the Corps, nor was desegregation smoothly or quickly achieved. Spurred by executive orders in 1941 and 1948, the integration of non-white USMC personnel proceeded in stages from segregated battalions in 1942, to unified training in 1949, and finally full integration in 1960.

By 2006, approximately 20% of the USMC was African-American and 15–18% Hispanic; more than the 30 to 31% of the U.S. ratio of minorities in the general population.

== History ==
=== Background ===
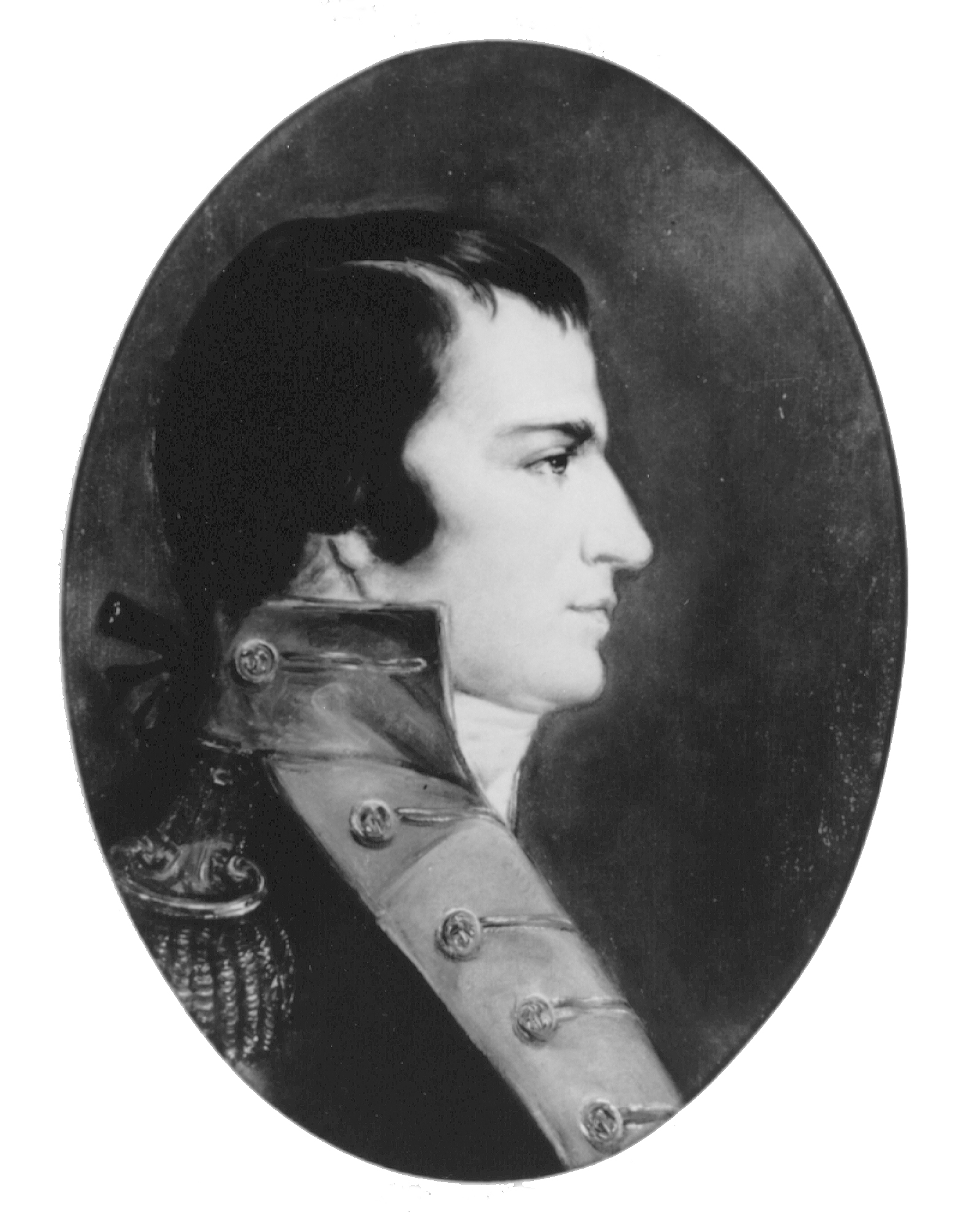
Marine Commandant William Ward Burrows enforced a policy against enlisting "Blacks and Mulattoes".

During the American Revolutionary War, African Americans served alongside white soldiers in the Continental Army, though they were initially banned from enlisting by George Washington. The first African-American to serve as a marine was John Martin (also known as Keto), a slave from Delaware who was recruited in April 1776 without his enslaver's permission by Continental Marines officer Miles Pennington of the brig Reprisal. Martin served on the marine platoon of the Reprisal for a year and a half, seeing action during his service, but was lost at sea alongside the rest of his unit when the brig sank in October 1777.

At least twelve other African-Americans served with various Continental Marine units from 1776 to 1777; more may have served but their ethnic identity was either not recorded or done so incorrectly on the records. When the Continental Marines was officially reconstituted as the United States Marine Corps in 1798, U.S. Secretary of War James McHenry stipulated in a letter to a subordinate that:

You may enlist.. as many Drummers and Fifers as possible, I do not care what Country the D & Fifers are of but you must be careful not to enlist more Foreigners than as one to three natives. You can make use of Blacks and Mulattoes while you recruit, but you cannot enlist them.

During the various conflicts fought by the United States from the early to mid-19th century, there are no records of African-Americans serving the USMC. However, the U.S. Navy frequently enlisted Black seamen during the same period, to the point where in 1839 the U.S. Secretary of the Navy James Kirke Paulding issued a directive that no more than five percent of enlistees in the navy could be African-American.

During the American Civil War, roughly 180,000 African-Americans enlisted in the Union Army, primarily serving in logistical roles such as teamsters, laborers, construction workers and chefs. Some fought the Confederate Army under European American officers in segregated units. In later conflicts, the United States Army used Black soldiers in the Spanish–American War and in World War I. However, when the United States Army Air Service was formed, only White people were allowed. Mexican Americans served in World War I integrated with European Americans in all of the service arms.

The United States Navy used Black sailors as cooks, stewards, construction workers and unskilled labor, but did not train them to fight. The Marine Corps did not recruit any Black Marines. Instead, the USMC was serviced by US Navy supply personnel including Black laborers. Unlike the US Army which had separate regiments that a soldier could remain in for his entire military career, Marines were individually transferred to various ship's detachments and naval bases. After World War I, the number of Blacks in both the Navy and the Army was reduced to about 1.5% of the total number of active servicemen, a proportion much lower than the number of blacks in the general population.

=== Franklin Roosevelt administration ===
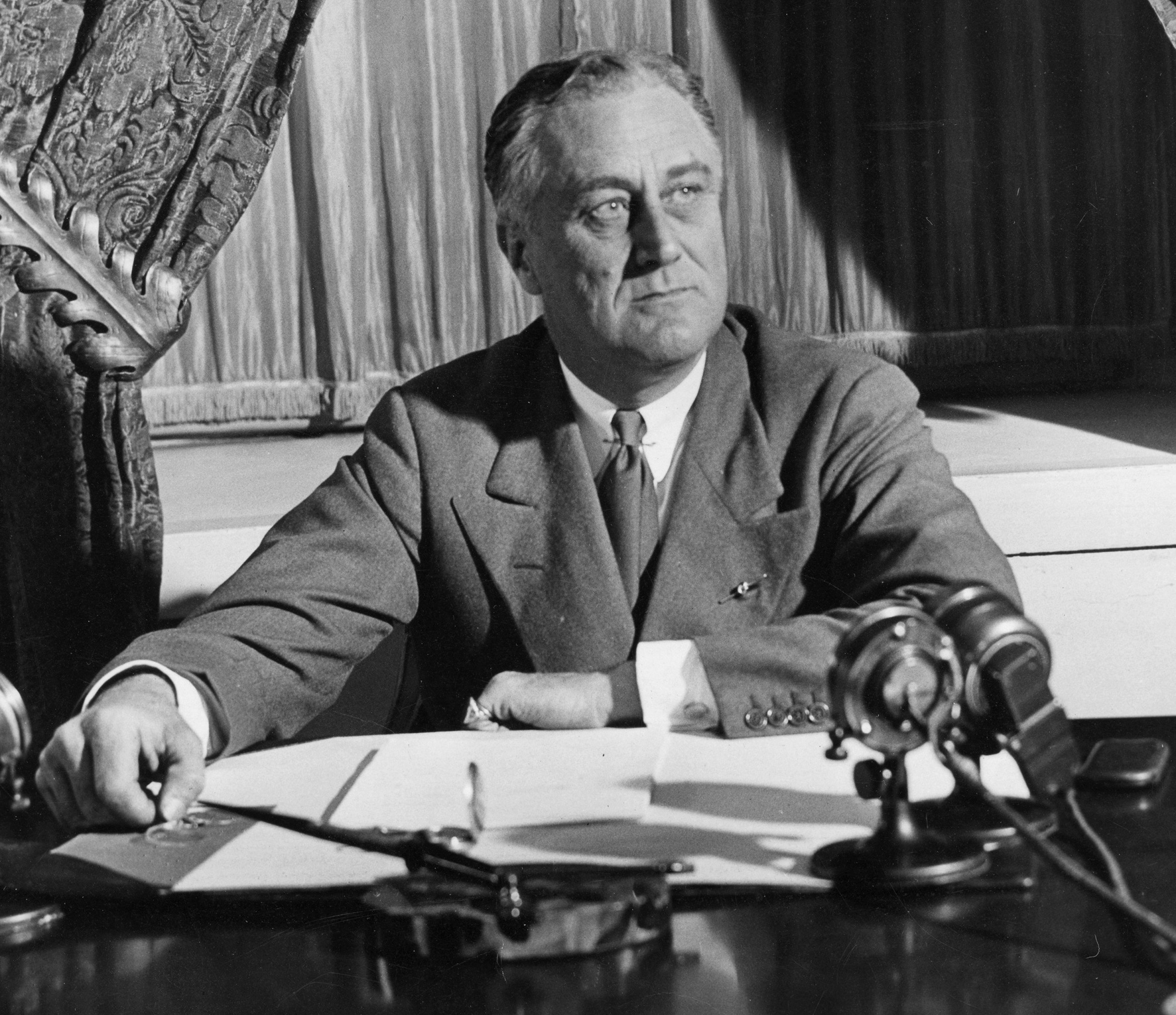
(Note: "President Franklin D. Roosevelt Broadcasting his First Fireside Chat Regarding the Banking Crisis, from the White House, Washington, DC". Photographic Print, 1933. National Archives and Records Administration, 6728517.) President Franklin Delano Roosevelt prohibited racial discrimination in the military.

During the administration of Franklin Delano Roosevelt, the growing political power of African-Americans was increasingly felt in Washington, DC. Civil rights groups such as the National Association for the Advancement of Colored People (NAACP), the National Urban League, and the National Negro Congress called for greater equality between the races. In 1938, the Committee on Participation of Negroes in the National Defense Program was formed by the Pittsburgh Courier, a newspaper with a large Black readership. Further calls to increase the proportion of blacks in the military were published in 1939.

After wars broke out in the late 1930s in Africa, China and Europe, black community leaders determined to use the black workforce's loyalty as leverage to gain greater racial equality at home. In June 1940, the NAACP's magazine, The Crisis, published a declaration that the fighting around the world was certainly bad, "but the hysterical cries of the preachers of democracy for Europe leave us cold. We want democracy in Alabama, Arkansas, in Mississippi and Michigan, in the District of Columbia, in the Senate of the United States." During the 1940 presidential election, both parties courted the black vote. Incumbent President Franklin Delano Roosevelt was re-elected, partly because substantial numbers of black voters crossed previous party lines and voted for the Democratic Party candidate.

In April 1941 the Navy convened its General Board to discuss expansion of the USMC. Major General Thomas Holcomb, Commandant of the Marines, who lived in Delaware and Washington, DC in his early years and attended private schools, said that African Americans had no right to serve as Marines. He said, "If it were a question of having a Marine Corps of 5,000 whites or 250,000 Negroes, I would rather have the whites."

In 1941, civil rights activists Bayard Rustin, A. Philip Randolph, and A. J. Muste pushed Roosevelt to order fair employment for blacks in the federal government. The activists threatened to march on Washington, DC, in July 1941, and Roosevelt intended to prevent such a public relations disaster for his presidency. On June 25, 1941, Roosevelt issued Executive Order 8802; the elimination of racial discrimination from federal departments, agencies, the military, and from private defense contractors. The black activists cancelled their planned march.

Directed by Roosevelt and US Navy Secretary Frank Knox to accept Black recruits, Holcomb proposed a separate battalion of African-Americans, a seacoast defense battalion armed with anti-aircraft and anti-shipping artillery. To make this battalion self-supporting, Holcomb determined that it would contain a rifle company, special weapons platoons, and a light tank platoon—all manned by Black Marines.

=== World War II ===
In early 1942, Philip Johnston, a U.S. Army veteran of World War I, suggested to the USMC that they follow the example of the Army and recruit native speakers of the Navajo language to pass important tactical messages by radio, to serve as code talkers on the battlefield. On May 5, 1942, the first group of 29 Navajo recruits was accepted at Marine Corps Recruit Depot San Diego. From 1942 to 1945, some 375 to 420 Navajo trained as code talkers, part of about 540 Marines who were native Navajo speakers during World War II. All of these soldiers served in desegregated units alongside Marines of various races. A total of 874 Native Americans of various tribes served in the USMC in World War II.

After the Japanese attack on Pearl Harbor, men of Japanese birth and descent were classified as enemy aliens and excluded from the United States draft. In addition, on the US mainland, the federal government forced most ethnic Japanese Americans to relocate from Pacific coastal areas to internment camps located inland of the Pacific and controlled by armed guards. It was not until 1944 that a fighting unit of Japanese-American Nisei (American-born) men were recruited and trained for military service. Japanese-Americans were allowed to join only the Army, not the Navy, Marines or Air Corps. The 442nd Infantry Regiment, consisting primarily of Japanese Americans, fought in Europe.

The USMC did not form battalions of Asian-Americans. Rather, it integrated Asian-American recruits with European-American soldiers. The first Chinese American USMC officer, Wilbur Carl Sze, was commissioned as a second lieutenant in December 1943. In contemporary times, proportionately fewer Asian Americans join the U.S. military than appear in the U.S. general population.

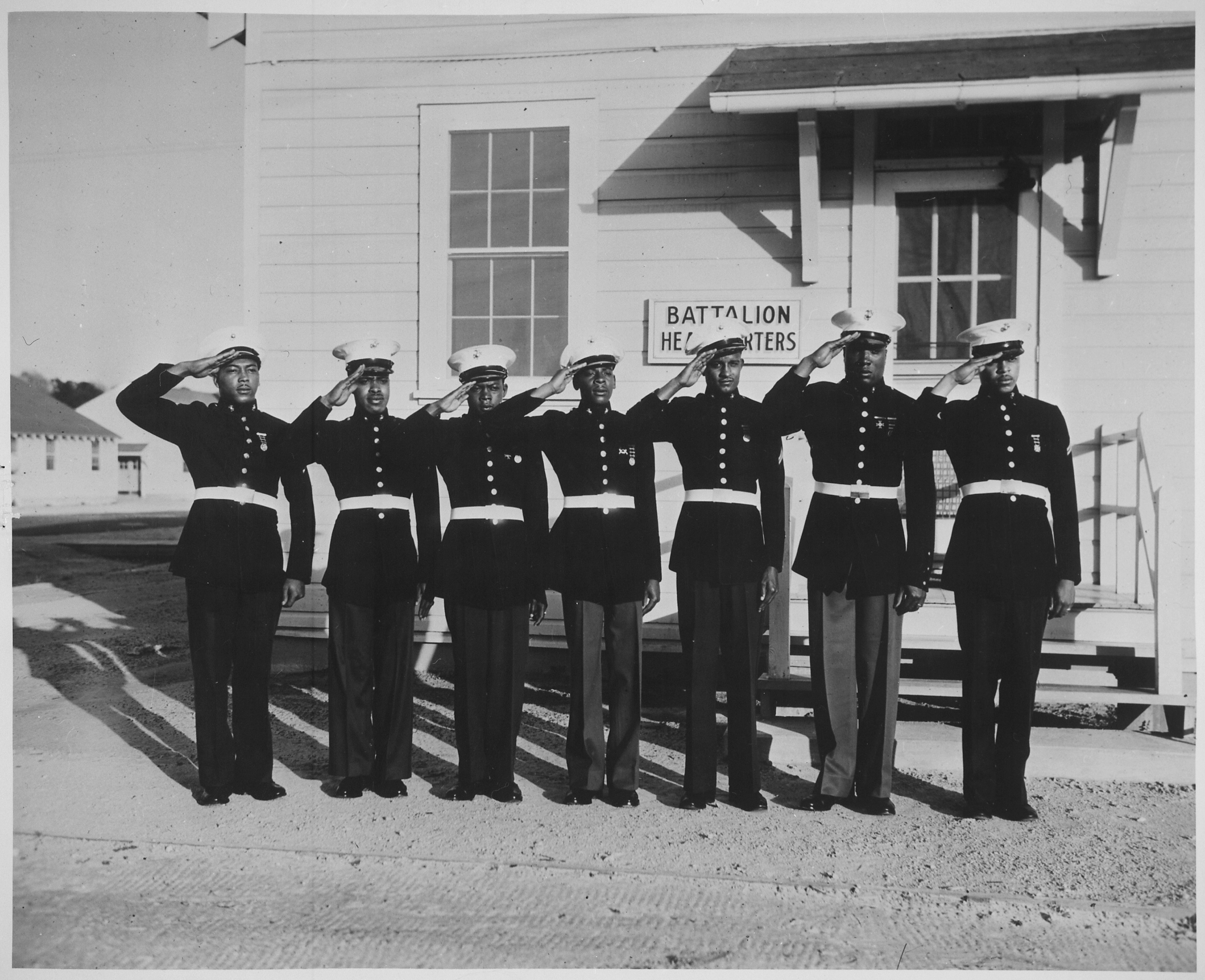
(Note: "... Although a dress uniform is not a part of the regular equipment, most of the Negro Marines spend $54 out of their pay for what is generally considered the snappiest uniform in the armed services... Photo shows a group of the Negro volunteers in their dress uniforms.". Photographic Print, c. 05/1943. National Archives and Records Administration, 535871.) Marines at Montford Point show their dress uniforms.

Technical Sargeant Alfred Masters and wife, Isabell Arch Masters.

Alfred Masters was the first African-American to be enlisted in the USMC on June 1, 1941 in Oklahoma City, OK at 12:01 a.m. since the Revolutionary War. His wife, Isabell Masters, was by his side at his swearing-in. Although the initial group of Black USMC recruits was admitted beginning June 1, 1942, they were not immediately trained because separate, segregated facilities had not been completed. Black volunteers began their basic training in August at Montford Point in North Carolina, a satellite base to Marine Barracks, New River, later called Marine Corps Base Camp Lejeune. The first Black recruit to arrive in camp was Howard P. Perry on August 26, followed that day by twelve others. These and subsequent recruits were organized into the 51st Composite Defense Battalion, a static artillery unit intended to hold land against attack.

By October 29, only 647 of a planned 1,200 recruits had passed entrance examinations—to avoid forming segregated training units to teach typing, truck driving and other specialist skills necessary to run the battalion, Holcomb required more than half of the recruits to demonstrate proficiency in these skills prior to acceptance. This requirement was dropped in view of the delay it caused in bringing the battalion up to strength. Recruits were taught specialist skills by white USMC instructors brought into Montford Point, or they were sent to nearby Army classes.

The Black recruits were not allowed on Camp Lejeune unless accompanied by a White Marine, and their service papers were stamped "Colored". Although the U.S. was by this time fully engaged in war, the recruits were assigned to inactive duty in the Marine Corps Reserve. Their units were segregated—all the enlisted servicemen were black, with white officers and drill instructors. The commander of the Black Marines at Montford Point was Samuel A. Woods Jr who worked to enforce segregation, protecting his troops from being detained by local authorities while they were visiting town. By early 1943, the White drill instructors were leaving for war and were being replaced by Black sergeants and corporals.

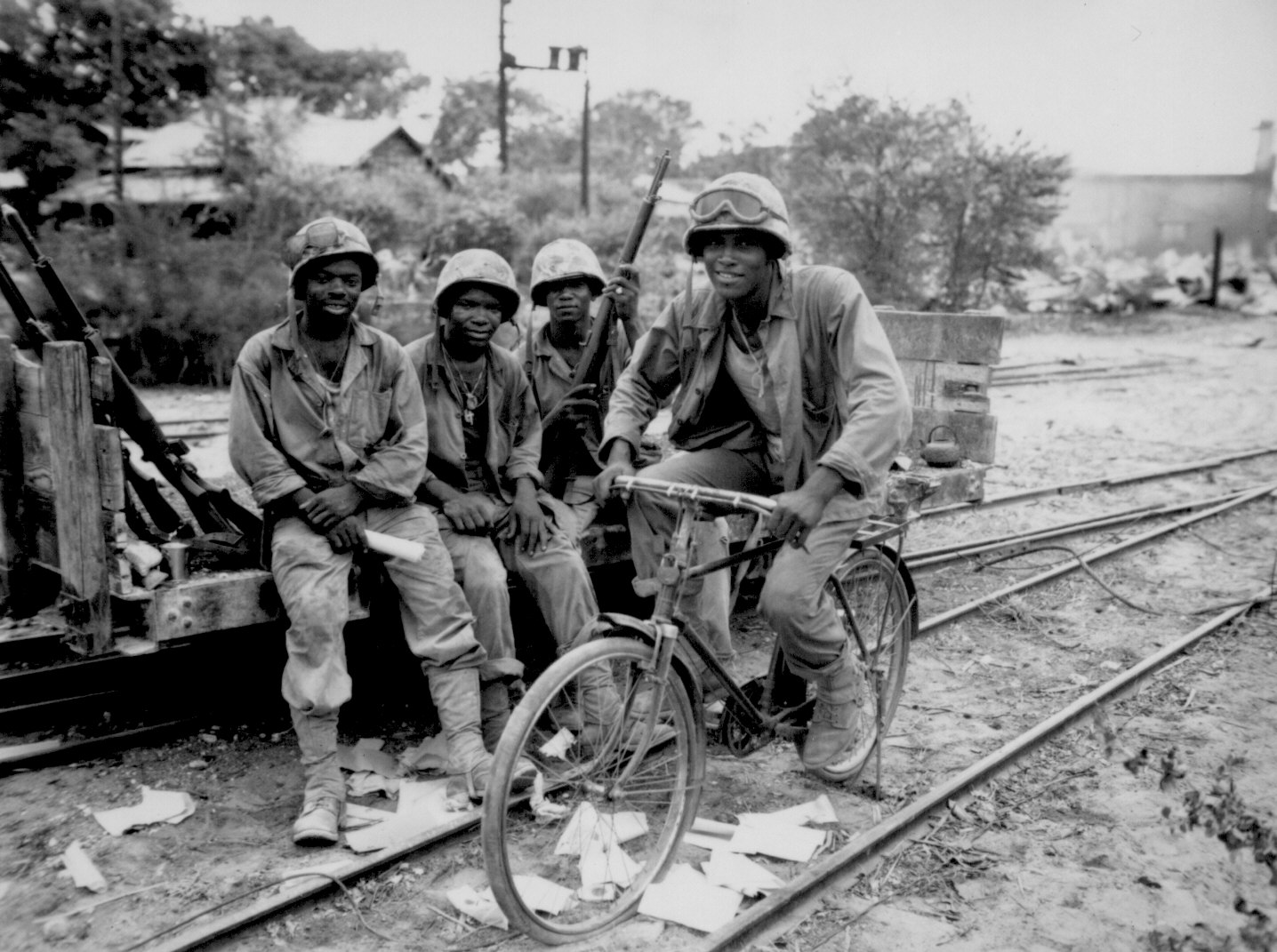
(Note: "Negro Marines, attached to the Third Ammunition Company, take time out from supplying ammunition to the front line on Saipan. Riding captured...bicycle is Pfc. Horace Boykin; and left to right, Cpl. Willis T. Anthony, Pfc. Emmitt Shackelford, and Pfc. Eugene Purdy.". Photographic Print, June 1944. National Archives and Records Administration, 127-N-8600.) Members of the 3d Ammunition Company, part of the 2nd Marine Division, relax with a captured bicycle during a break from their role in the Battle of Saipan.

After accepting more Black recruits, the USMC formed the 52nd Defense Battalion. Alfred Masters was reassigned from the 51st to the 52nd, and rose to the rank of Technical Sergeant. Both the 51st and 52nd shipped out to fight in the Pacific War, but as defense units holding land far behind the front lines they did not see much action. In total, 19,168 African Americans joined the Marines, about 4% of the USMC's strength; some 75% of them performed their duties overseas. About 8,000 black USMC stevedores and ammunition handlers served under enemy fire during offensive operations in the Pacific. Following the June 1944 Battle of Saipan, USMC General Alexander Vandegrift said of the steadfast performance of the all-black 3d Marine Ammunition Company: "The Negro Marines are no longer on trial. They are Marines, period."

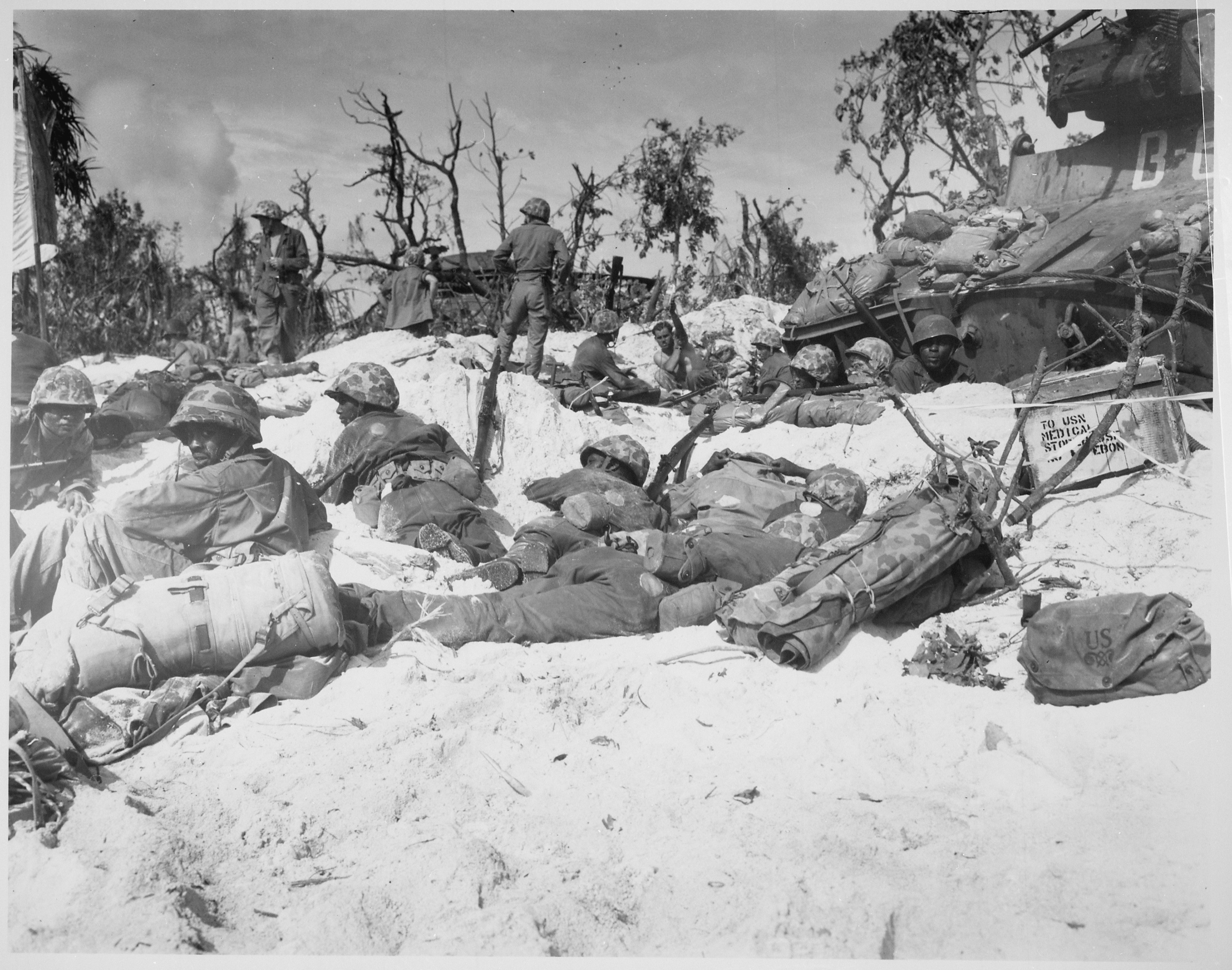
D-day Peleliu, African Americans of one of the two segregated units that supported the 7th Marines – the 16th Marine Field Depot or the 17th Naval Construction Battalion Special take a break in the 115 degree heat., 09-15-1944 – NARA – 532535

A testament to this came at Peleliu 15–18 September 1944. On D-day the 7th Marines were in a situation where they did not have enough men to man the lines and get the wounded to safety. Coming to their aid were the 2 companies of the 16 Marine Field Depot (segregated) and the 17th Special Seabee (segregated). That night the Japanese mounted a counter-attack at 0200 hours. The Field Depot Marines are recorded as again having humped ammunition, to the front lines on the stretchers they brought the wounded back on and picked up rifles to become infantrymen. By the time it was over nearly the entire 17th CB had volunteered alongside them. The Seabee record states they volunteered to man the line where the wounded had been, man 37mm that had lost their crews and volunteered for anything dangerous. The 17th remained with the 7th Marines until the right flank had been secured D-plus 3. According to the Military History Encyclopedia on the Web, were it not for the "Black Marine shore party personal" the counterattack on the 7th Marines would not have been repulsed.

- On Peleliu, shore party detachments from the 33rd and 73rd CBs received Presidential Unit Citations. The three commanders of the 7th Marine Ammo Co., the 11th Marine Depot Co. and the 17th Special CB all received the same commendatory letter. Before the battle was even over, Major General Rupertus USMC wrote to each that: "The Negro race can well be proud of the work performed by the: 7th Marine Ammo Co., the 11th Marine Depot Co., and the 17th Special CB. The wholehearted co-operation and untiring efforts which demonstrated in every respect that they appreciate the privilege of wearing a Marine uniform and serving with Marines in combat. Please convey to your command these sentiments and inform them that in the eyes of the entire division they have earned a WELL DONE." The U.S. Navy made an official press release in November 1944 of the segregated units having received that "Well Done" from the Marine Corps.

=== 1948 to 1960 ===
After World War II, the USMC reduced in size; the number of African-American Marines dropped to 2,000 men, which was one-tenth of wartime levels. In 1947, the Marine Corps forced African-American men to choose between leaving the service or becoming a steward (a food service position). A few non-white Marines advanced in grade, such as Kurt Chew-Een Lee, a Chinese-American Marine who was commissioned a second lieutenant in 1946. Lee earned the Navy Cross under fire in Korea in September 1950, serving in the 1st Battalion 7th Marines; at the time this was a primarily Euro-American unit.

On July 26, 1948, President Harry S. Truman issued Executive Order 9981 establishing equality of treatment and opportunity in the U.S. military regardless of race. He appointed the President's Committee on Equality of Treatment and Opportunity in the Armed Services, two of whose five members were African American. In January 1949, the Fahy Committee (nicknamed after its chairman) met to hear concerns by armed forces' leaders about the new executive order, and both the Army and the Marine Corps leadership defended their practices of segregation. The Navy and the newly formed United States Air Force announced their intentions to follow the order. The USMC said that it had only one black officer among 8,200 white ones.

In late 1949, all-black USMC units persisted, but the Marines had Black and White recruits beginning to train together. The few black USMC officers were assigned exclusively to black units; they were not asked to lead white Marines into combat. In 1952 after two years of the Korean War, the Marines cautiously integrated Blacks into combat units. In the late 1950s, Black Marines were not rewarded with preferred or high-visibility assignments, such as embassy guard duty and guard duty in the nation's capital. By 1960, full integration of the races had been completed by the USMC, but racial tensions flared up through the next decade, a period of civil rights activism in the larger society.

== Representation in other media ==
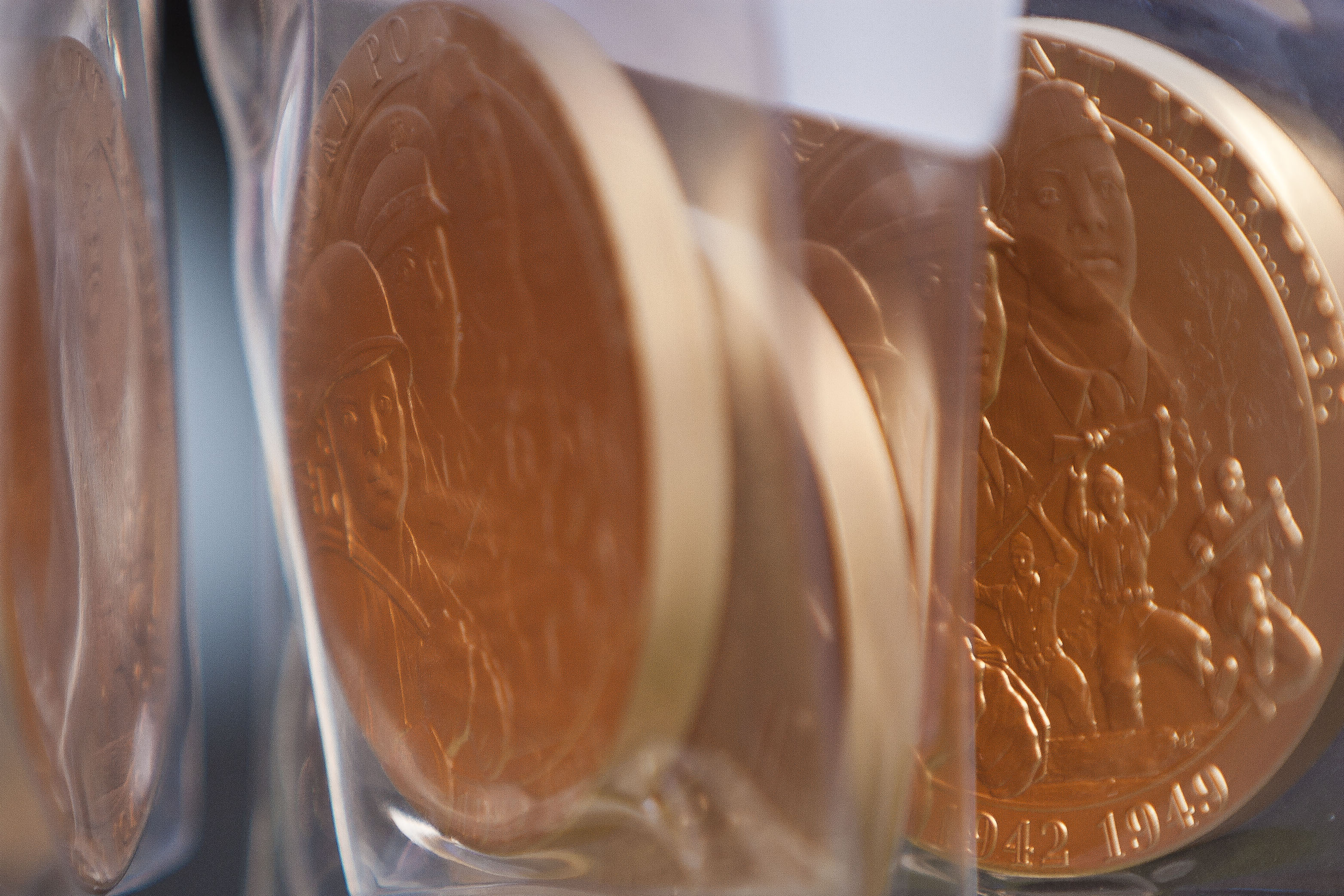
Montford Point Marines were guests of honor at Marine Barracks Washington in August 2011, bringing their story to the national forefront. On June 28, 2012, they were awarded replicas of a Congressional Gold Medal during a presentation ceremony at the historic parade grounds.

In May 2011, The Black Rep of Saint Louis, Missouri gave the world premier of The Montford Point Marine, a new play by Samm-Art Williams about a veteran of the unit and his life after his groundbreaking training and service in Korea.

== See also ==
- Racial segregation in the United States Armed Forces
- Hispanics in the United States Marine Corps
- History of the United States Marine Corps
- Military history of African Americans
- Montford Point Marine Association
