= Edgar Huff =

United States Marine

Edgar Richard Huff
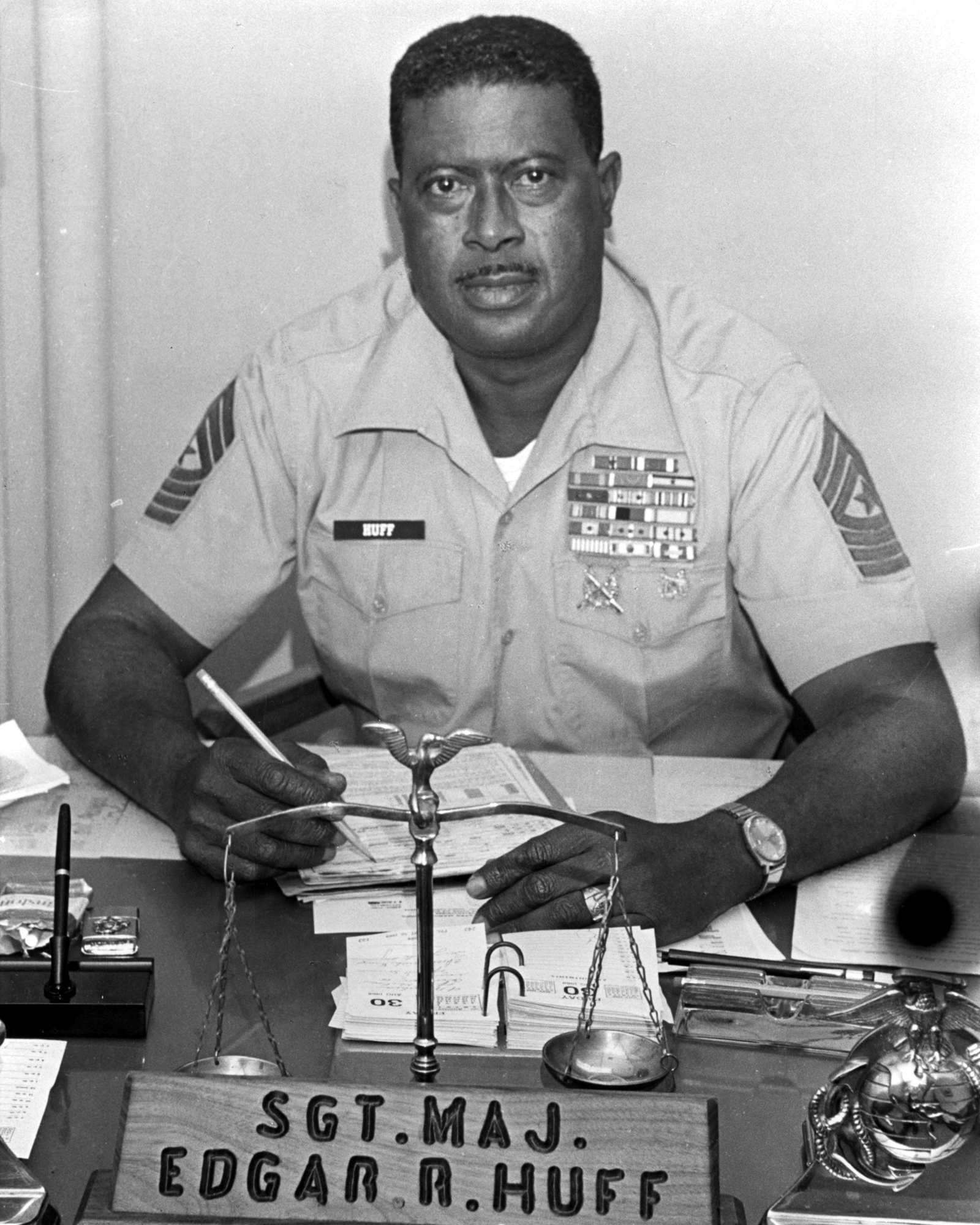
- Sergeant Major Edgar R. Huff, USMC
- Born: December 2, 1919; Gadsden, Alabama
- Died: May 2, 1994 (aged 74); Camp Lejeune, North Carolina
- Military career
- Allegiance: United States of America
- Branch: United States Marine Corps
- Service years: 1942–1972
- Rank: Sergeant major
- Unit: 2nd Battalion, 1st Marines
- Conflicts: World War II; Korean War; Vietnam War
- Awards: Bronze Star (2); Purple Heart (3)

Edgar Richard Huff (December 2, 1919 – May 2, 1994) was the first African-American in the United States Marine Corps to be promoted to the rank of sergeant major. He served in World War II, the Korean War and the Vietnam War, and retired in 1972 after 30 years of service in the United States Marines.

== Marine Corps service ==
Huff, a native of Gadsden, Alabama, enlisted in the Marine Corps on September 24, 1942, as one of the first African-Americans to do so. Huff received his recruit training with the 51st Composite Defense Battalion, Montford Point Camp, New River, North Carolina. Following graduation, he joined the 155 mm gun battery of the 51st Composite Defense Battalion and served as a gun commander.

In early 1943, he was assigned duty under instruction at drill instructors school, and upon completion of his course, was assigned duty as a drill instructor in March 1943. At that time, Montford Point Camp was the receiving point for all blacks entering the Marine Corps, and by November 1944, Huff had been assigned duty as field sergeant major of all recruit training at the Montford Point Camp.

In November 1944, he was promoted to first sergeant and assigned duty with the 5th Depot Company, departing for the Western Pacific area, serving as first sergeant with this unit on Saipan, Okinawa, and in North China. The 5th Depot Company furnished logistic support for Marine divisions in that area. Gilbert Johnson, the only other black sergeant major besides Huff to serve during World War II, was Huff's brother-in-law. They were married to twin sisters.

Following World War II, he served as Non-Commissioned Officer in Charge of Recruit Training at Montford Point Camp until May 1949. He was then assigned duty as guard and infantry chief, Marine Barracks, Naval Ammunition Depot, Earle, New Jersey, until May 1951, at which time he assumed duty with the famed 1st Marine Division in Korea. There, he saw combat as a company gunnery sergeant with the 2nd Battalion 1st Marines, and participated in operations in the "Punch Bowl" area, eastern front, and in the spring-summer offensive on the West Central front.

Upon his return to the United States in August 1952, he was assigned to the 2nd Marine Division, serving as First Sergeant, Weapons Company, 2nd Battalion 8th Marines. In March 1955, he was assigned duty as Guard Chief, Marine Barracks, Naval Air Station, Fort Lyautey, French Morocco.

Huff was promoted to first sergeant in the new rank structure on December 30, 1955, and to the rank of sergeant major the next day. From that date, he served at the following Marine Corps installations: Post Sergeant Major, Marine Barracks, Port Lyautey, French Morocco; with the 2nd Force Service Regiment; Landing Force Training Unit, Little Creek, Virginia; the 3rd Marine Division, Fleet Marine Force, Okinawa; the 3rd Force Service Regiment; the 1st Infantry Training Regiment, Camp Geiger, Camp Lejeune, North Carolina; Base Sergeant Major, Marine Corps Base Camp Pendleton, California; the 1st Military Police Battalion, Force Logistic Command, and with the III Marine Amphibious Force, Republic of Vietnam (May 1967 – June 1968); and with the 2nd Marine Aircraft Wing (July 1968 – October 1970).

Huff served a second tour of duty in the Republic of Vietnam, as sergeant major with the III Marine Amphibious Force from October 1970 until October 1971. He then served as sergeant major of the Marine Corps Air Station New River, Jacksonville, North Carolina, until his retirement on September 30, 1972.

Huff died on May 2, 1994, at Camp Lejeune Naval Hospital.

He is featured in the book Bloods by Wallace Terry.

== Awards and decorations ==
Huff's awards and decorations include:

1st Row		Bronze Star w/ 1 award star & valor device	Purple Heart w/ 2 award stars	
2nd Row	Navy and Marine Corps Commendation Medal w/ 2 award stars	Navy and Marine Corps Achievement Medal	Combat Action Ribbon	Navy Presidential Unit Citation w/ 1 service star
3rd Row	Marine Corps Good Conduct Medal w/ 9 service stars	China Service Medal	American Campaign Medal	Asiatic-Pacific Campaign Medal w/ 6 service stars
4th Row	World War II Victory Medal	Navy Occupation Service Medal	National Defense Service Medal w/ 1 service star	Korean Service Medal w/ 3 service stars
5th Row	Vietnam Service Medal w/ 2 service stars	Korean Presidential Unit Citation	United Nations Korea Medal	Vietnam Campaign Medal

== See also ==
- Desegregation in the United States Marine Corps
