= Mount Hebron, Alabama =

Unincorporated community in Alabama, United States

- Unincorporated community
- Location within Alabama Location within the United States
- Coordinates: 34°08′32″N 86°17′22″W
- Country: United States
- State: Alabama
- County: Marshall
- Elevation: 879 ft (268 m)
- Time zone: UTC-6 (Central (CST))
  - Summer (DST): UTC-5 (CDT)
- Area codes: 256 & 938
- GNIS feature ID: 123202

Mount Hebron is an unincorporated community in Marshall County, Alabama, United States.

Mount Hebron is the hometown of Gilbert Johnson, who was one of the first African Americans to enlist in, become one of the first African American drill instructors in, and eventually becoming one of the first black Sergeants Major in the United States Marine Corps. As of 1974, the previously-named Montford Point in Jacksonville, North Carolina, was renamed Camp Gilbert H. Johnson in his honor.
