= Ernie Harris =

Ernie Harris may refer to:

- Ernie Harris (cricketer)
- Ernie Harris (politician)

== See also ==
- Ernest J. Harris, American entomologist
