= Rudder (disambiguation) =

A rudder is a steering device.

Rudder may also refer to:

- Rudder (surname)
- Camp Rudder, a U.S. Army Ranger School training facility
- Rudder Middle School, San Antonio, Texas
- Rudder High School, Bryan, Texas
- Rudder Point, Leskov Island, South Sandwich Islands
- Rudder (software)
- The Rudder, magazine, 1891-1977
