= Ernest J. Harris =

American entomologist (1928–2018)

Ernest James Harris
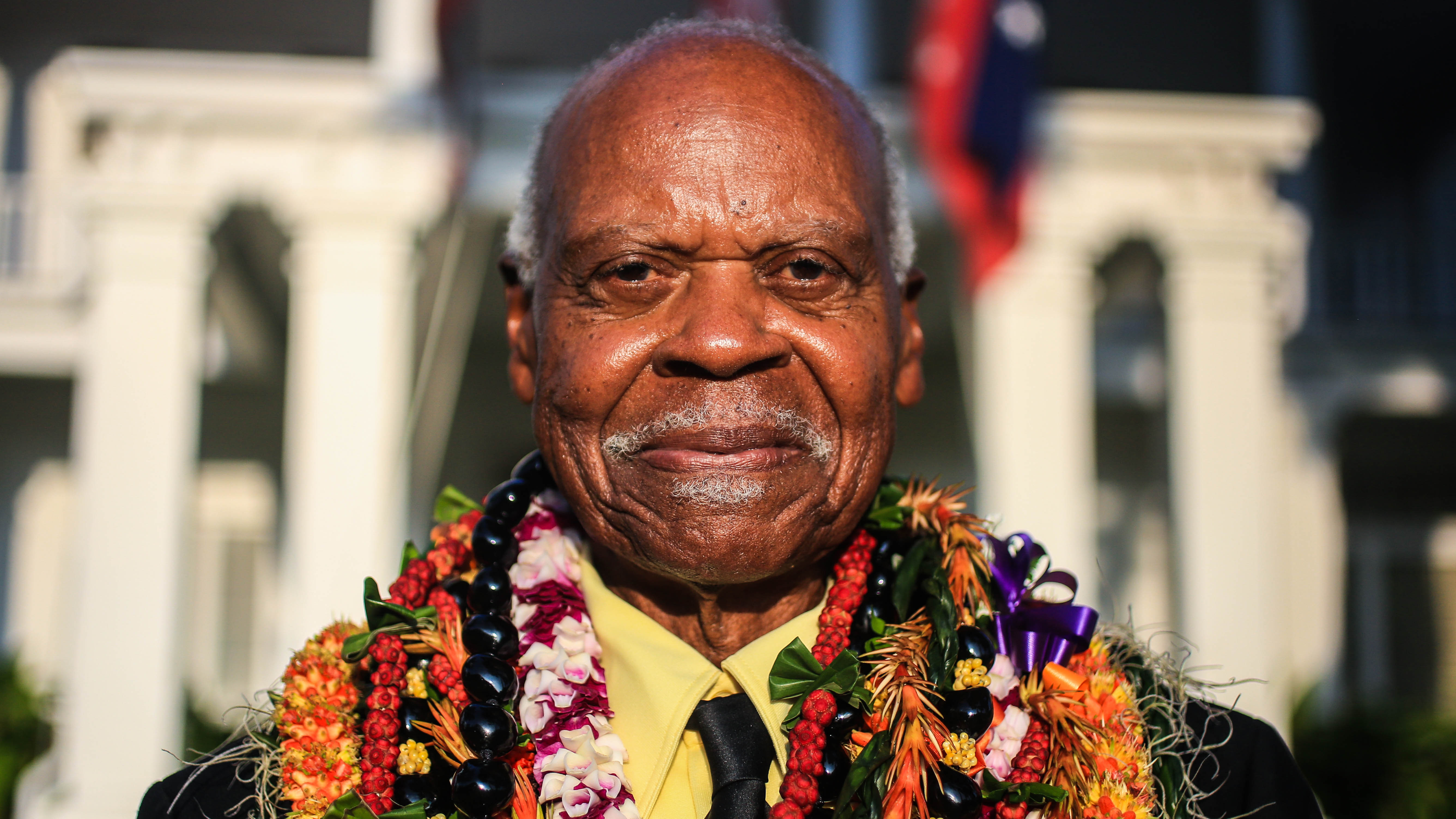
- Harris smiles after receiving the Congressional Gold Medal in 2016 for his service as a Montford Point Marine
- Born: May 24, 1928; North Little Rock, Arkansas
- Died: February 20, 2018 (aged 89)
- Education: University of Hawaiʻi; University of Arkansas at Pine Bluff
- Scientific career
- Workplaces: United States Department of Agriculture; University of Arkansas at Pine Bluff; University of Minnesota
- Thesis: Biotic factors influencing population trends of the Mediterranean fruit fly, Ceratitis capitata (Wiedemann), in selected host habitats in Tunisia (1975)

Ernest James Harris (May 24, 1928 – February 20, 2018) was an American entomologist who is best known for his work on Biosteres arisanus, a species of wasp. He was inducted into the Arkansas Black Hall of Fame in 1999.

== Early life and education ==
Harris was born in North Little Rock, Arkansas. He was the youngest of six children, and grew up on a 45-acre cotton farm without access to electricity. Every year he missed school during the harvest to pick cotton, and would have to study by candlelight. He became interested in insects as a child. He was a student at Pulaski County Training School, which was segregated at the time, and graduated wanting to become an airplane mechanic. Harris attended the Camp Gilbert H. Johnson, which was also segregated, where he was only given menial tasks. Harris was one of the first African-Americans to serve in the United States Marine Corps, enlisted under Executive Order 8802. Harris served as a Montford Point Marine.

As the United States Army began to decrease its enrolment, a newly established G.I. Bill offered Harris and his sister the opportunity to attend college. Harris attended the University of Arkansas at Pine Bluff (then Arkansas A&M), where he focussed on chemistry and zoology. When he graduated he could only find work as a janitor, so instead he left Arkansas on a cross-country Harley-Davidson adventure. He eventually found a job in Milwaukee, working in a foundry and studying the chemical composition of ores.

== Research and career ==
Harris eventually moved to Minnesota, where he joined the United States Forest Service. Here he worked toward a graduate degree in entomology at the University of Minnesota, where he studied Cryptorhynchus weevils. He eventually returned to the University of Arkansas at Pine Bluff, where he was appointed a lecturer in science.

In 1962 Harris moved to Hawaii, where he was recruited by Loren Steiner to join the United States Department of Agriculture (USDA). He was one of the first African-American research scientists to work for the USDA. He spent almost four decades at the USDA, where he led the Biology and Ecology Research Unit. A few years after moving to Oahu Harris began a doctoral research programme, during which he studied population trends of Ceratitis capitata (Mediterranean fruit fly) at the University of Hawaiʻi at Mānoa. Harris extensively studied Biosteres arisanus, a species of wasp that is parasitic for fruit fly eggs. Several nations adopted the use of the Harris strain of this wasp to eradicate fruit flies, including Chile, who have been fruit fly free since 1975. This success resulted in Harris being awarded a commendation from the government of Chile. His research formed the basis of California's Mediterranean fruit fly exclusion programme. Harris developed ways to rear Fopius arisanus, a parasite that was designed to attack Mediterranean fruit flies and melon fly.

Despite retiring in 2006, Harris continued to work for the USDA in Honolulu until it closed in 2009.

== Awards and honours ==
- 1989 Inducted into the Royal Entomological Society
- 2012 NAACP Lifetime Achievement Award for Distinguished Service
- 2016 Congressional Gold Medal

== Select publications ==
- Steiner, L. F.; Mitchell, W. C.; Harris, E. J.; Kozuma, T. T.; Fujimoto, M. S. (1965-10-01). "Oriental Fruit Fly Eradication by Male Annihilation". Journal of Economic Entomology. 58 (5): 961–964. doi:10.1093/jee/58.5.961. ISSN 0022-0493.
- Burdick, G. E.; Harris, E. J.; Dean, H. J.; Walker, T. M.; Skea, Jack; Colby, David (1964-04-01). "The Accumulation of DDT in Lake Trout and the Effect on Reproduction". Transactions of the American Fisheries Society. 93 (2): 127–136. doi:10.1577/1548-8659(1964)93[127:TAODIL]2.0.CO;2. ISSN 0002-8487.
- Harris, E. J.; Nakagawa, S.; Urago, T. (1971-02-01). "Sticky Traps for Detection and Survey of Three Tephritids". Journal of Economic Entomology. 64 (1): 62–65. doi:10.1093/jee/64.1.62. ISSN 0022-0493.

== Personal life ==
Harris was married to Bettye Jo Harris, who he met in Milwaukee. Together they had three children.
