= Rudner =

Rudner is a surname. Notable people with the surname include:

- Rita Rudner (born 1953), American comedian
- Sara Rudner (born 1944), American dancer and choreographer
- Thomas Rudner (born 1961), German politician
- Richard Rudner (1921–79), Philosopher

== See also ==
- Rudder (surname)
