= Gilbert Johnson =

US Marine Corps drill instructor

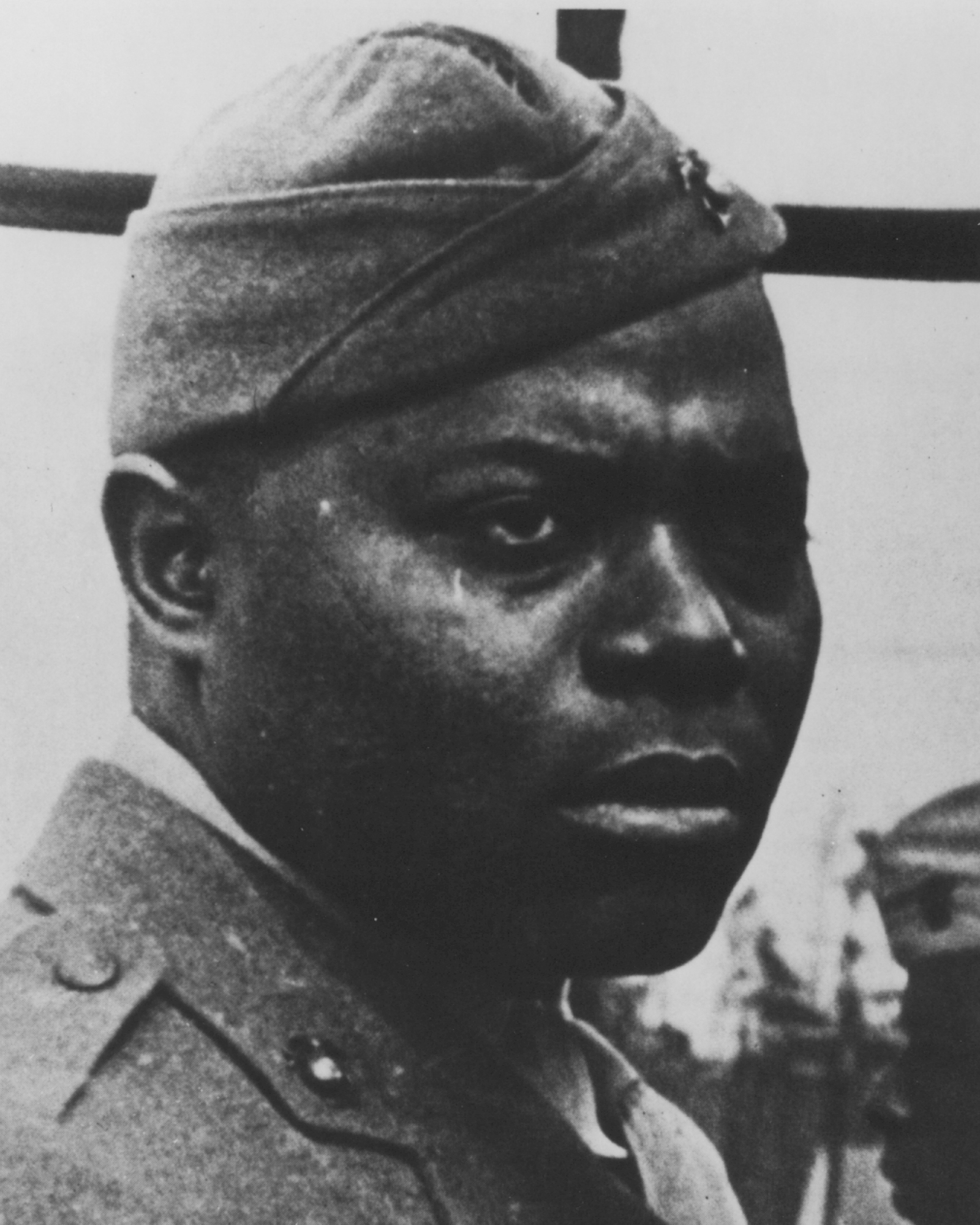
- Born: Gilbert Hubert Johnson; October 30, 1905; Mount Hebron, Alabama, U.S.
- Died: August 5, 1972 (aged 66); Jacksonville, North Carolina, U.S.
- Burial place: Arlington National Cemetery
- Military career
- Allegiance: United States of America
- Branch: United States Army (1923–1929); United States Navy (1933–1942); United States Marine Corps (1942–1959)
- Service years: 1923–1929, 1933–1959
- Rank: Sergeant major
- Nickname: Hashmark
- Conflicts: World War II; Korean War

Sergeant Major Gilbert Hubert "Hashmark" Johnson (October 30, 1905 – August 5, 1972) was one of the first African Americans to enlist in the United States Marine Corps and one of the first African American drill instructors in the Marine Corps. Johnson was known as “Hashmark” because he had more service stripes than rank stripes. He retired in 1959 after 32 years of service in the U.S. armed forces, including 17 years as a Marine.

== Early years ==
Gilbert Hubert Johnson was born on October 30, 1905, to a farming family in rural Mount Hebron, Alabama. He attended Stillman College in 1922, aspiring to become a minister, but he left college the following year to join the U.S. Army.

== Military service ==
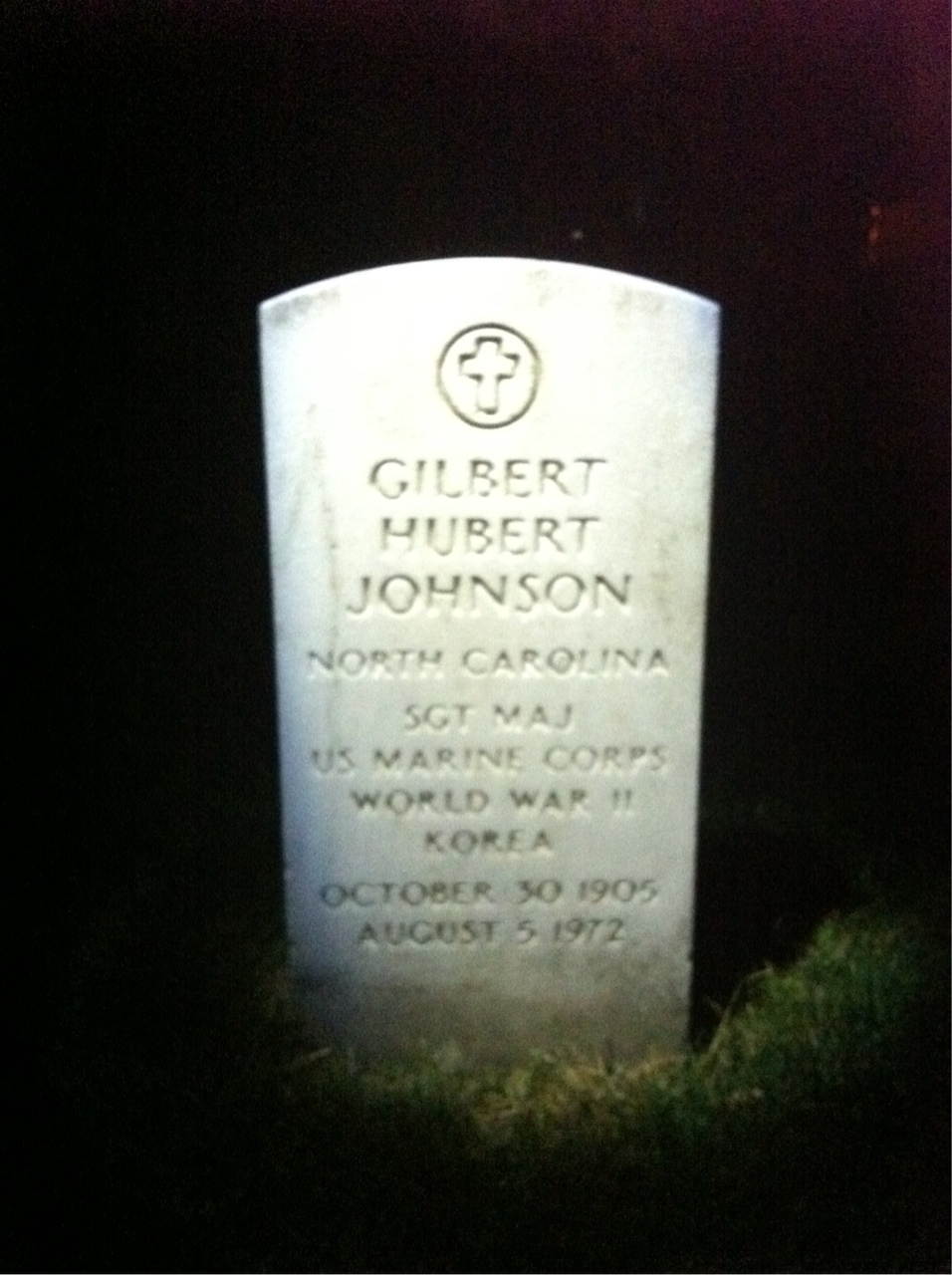
Grave of Gilbert H. Johnson at Arlington National Cemetery

Johnson enlisted in the 25th Infantry Regiment in 1923, serving two three-year tours. At the end of his enlistment in October 1929, Johnson was discharged as a corporal.

After four years of civilian life, he decided to join the U.S. Navy. In 1933, he enlisted in the Naval Reserve and was accepted into the Stewards Branch, the only job available to blacks at that time, where he served in the Navy for nearly 10 years. In May 1941, he entered the regular Navy. Johnson served aboard the USS Wyoming at the time of the bombing of Pearl Harbor.

In 1941, President Franklin D. Roosevelt issued Executive Order 8802, requiring the Marine Corps to accept blacks and forbidding discrimination by military contractors. That year Johnson requested transfer from the U.S. Navy to the United States Marine Corps. Initially he and other African Americans served in segregated units. He went on to serve the last 17 years of his 32-year military career in the Marine Corps. He earned his nickname because during his initial Marine Corps training at Montford Point, he wore three service stripes (hashmarks) on the sleeve of his uniform, indicating his previous enlistments in the Army and Navy.

In 1943, Johnson was among the first black men to be trained as Marine drill instructors. In May 1943 at Montford Point, he replaced drill instructor First Sergeant Robert W. Colwell. As a member of the 52d Defense Battalion, on Guam in World War II, Johnson asked that black Marines be assigned to combat patrols, from which they had been exempt. Once approved, he personally led 25 combat patrols.

Edgar Huff, the only other black sergeant major besides Johnson to serve during World War II, was Johnson's brother-in-law. They were married to twin sisters.

== Honors ==
Two years after Johnson died from a heart attack, the Montford Point facility at Camp Lejeune, North Carolina, was renamed Camp Gilbert H. Johnson in his honor. It was the first military installation to be named after an African American.

== See also ==
- List of African-American firsts
- Frederick C. Branch, the first African American officer in the Marine Corps
