= Executive Order 9981 =

1948 order by President Truman

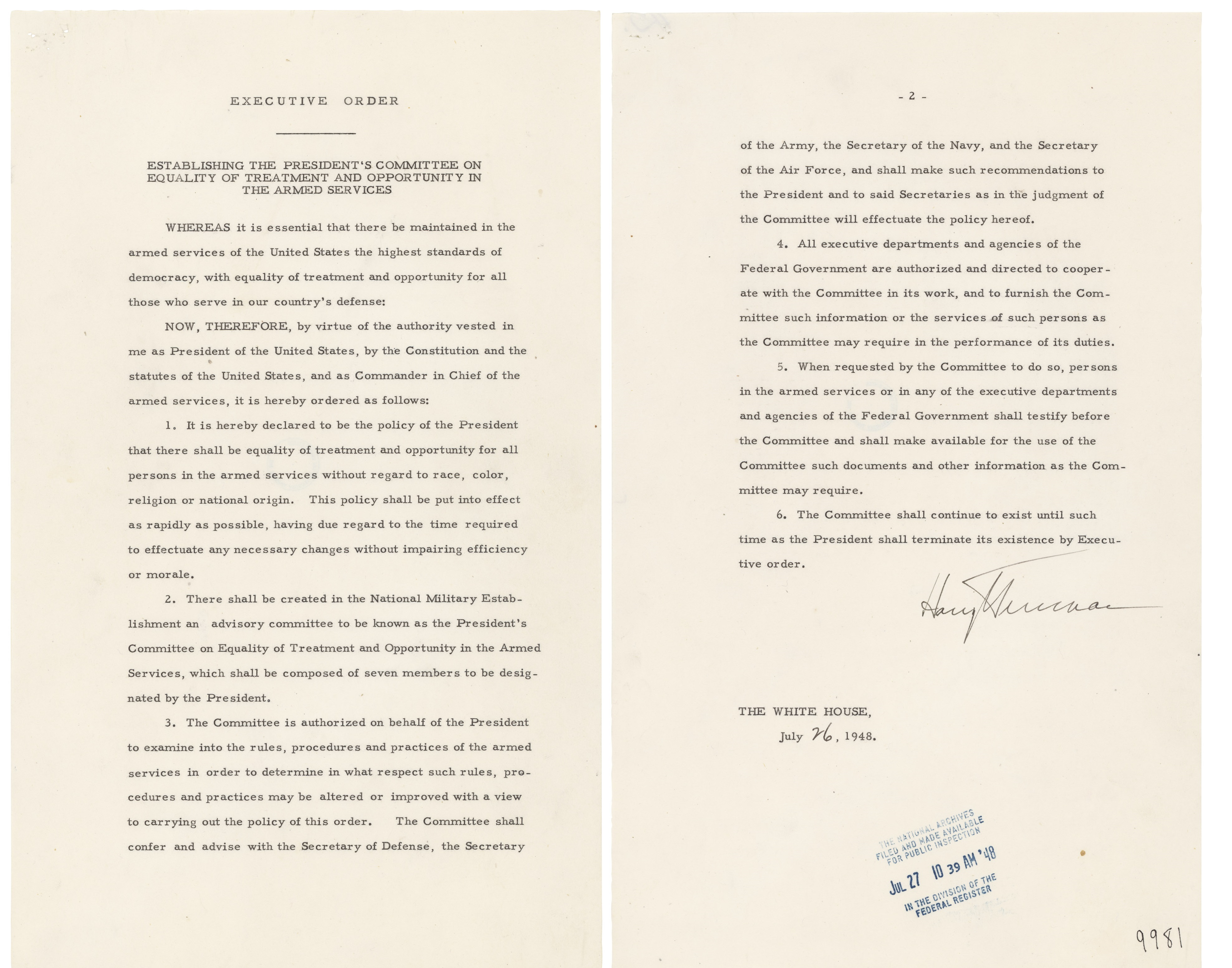
Executive Order 9981

Executive Order 9981 was an executive order issued on July 26, 1948, by President Harry S. Truman. It abolished discrimination "on the basis of race, color, religion or national origin" in the United States Armed Forces. The order led to the reintegration of the services during the Korean War (1950–1953). It was a crucial event in the post–World War II civil rights movement and a major achievement of Truman's presidency.

For Truman, Executive Order 9981 was inspired, in part, by an attack on Isaac Woodard, who was an American soldier and African American World War II veteran. On February 12, 1946, hours after being honorably discharged from the United States Army, he was attacked while still in uniform by South Carolina police as he was taking a bus home. The attack left Woodard completely and permanently blind. President Harry S. Truman ordered a federal investigation. Truman also established the President's Committee on Civil Rights, whose report, To Secure These Rights, condemned the state of civil rights in the nation and recommended actions to correct these failures. He then made a historic speech to the NAACP and the nation in June 1947 in which he described civil rights as a moral imperative, submitted a comprehensive civil rights bill to Congress in February 1948, and issued Executive Orders 9980 and 9981 on July 26, 1948, desegregating the armed forces and promoting anti-discrimination throughout the federal government.

== Before Executive Order 9981 ==
The Chicago Defender announcing Executive Order 9981

Black Americans in the military worked under different rules that delayed their entry into combat. They had to wait four years before they could begin combat training while a white American would begin training within months of being qualified. The Air Corps was deliberately delaying the training of African Americans even though it needed more manpower (Survey and Recommendations). The Women's Army Corps (WAC) reenlistment program was open to black women, but overseas assignments were not.

Black soldiers who were stationed in Britain during World War II learned that the US military attempted to impose Jim Crow segregation on them even though Britain did not practice the racism which was practiced in the US. According to author Anthony Burgess, when pub owners in Bamber Bridge were told to segregate their facilities by the US military, they installed signs that read "Black Troops Only". One soldier commented: "One thing I noticed here and which I don't like is the fact that the English don't draw any color line. The English must be pretty ignorant. I can't see how a white girl could associate with a negro."

In a 1945 survey which was conducted among 250 white officers and sergeants who had a black platoon assigned to their company, the following results were collected: 77% of both officers and sergeants said that they had become more favorable towards black soldiers after a black platoon was assigned to their company (no cases were found in which someone said that their attitude towards blacks had turned less favorable), 84% of officers and 81% of sergeants thought that the black soldiers had performed very well in combat, only 5% of officers and only 4% of sergeants thought that black infantry soldiers were not as good as white infantry soldiers, and 73% of officers and 60% of sergeants thought that black soldiers and white soldiers got along very well when they were together. According to this particular survey, there were no reasonable grounds for racial segregation in the armed forces.

== Attempts to end discrimination ==
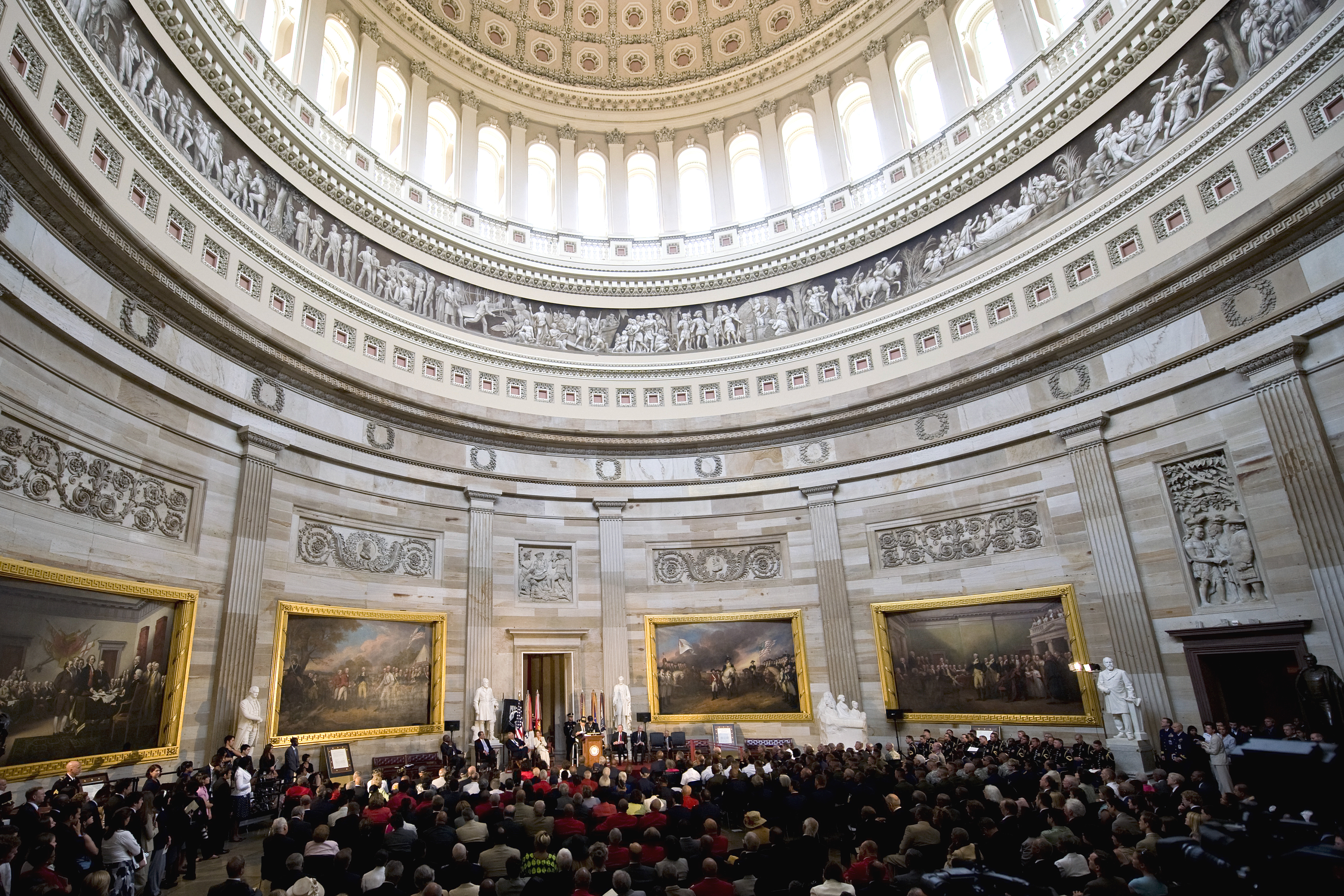
World War II veteran Spencer Moore addresses the audience in the Capitol Rotunda, Washington, D.C., at an event marking the 60th anniversary of the integration of the U.S. Armed Forces (July 23, 2008).

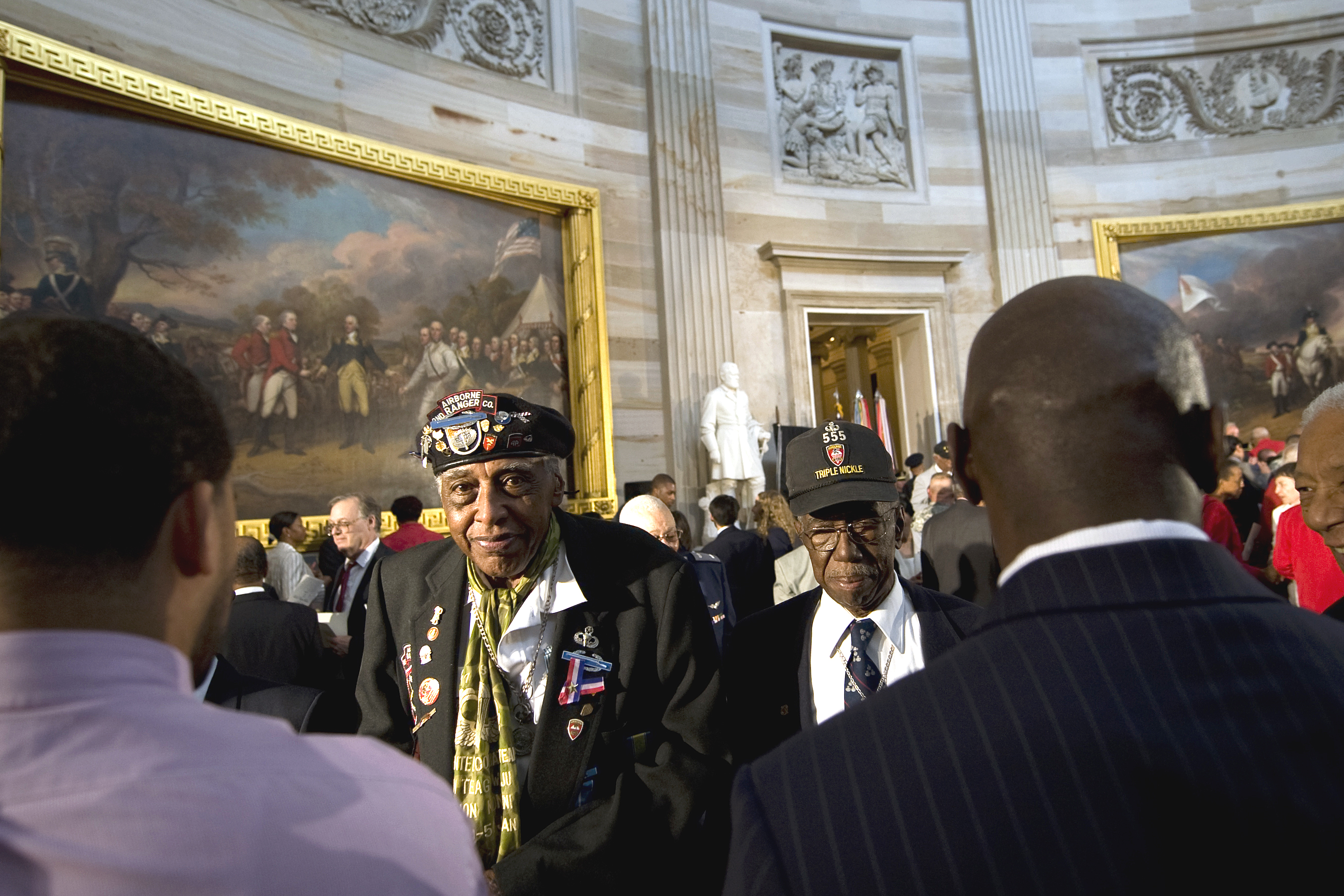
World War II veterans talk with audience members in the Capitol Rotunda at an event marking the 60th anniversary of Executive Order 9981 (July 23, 2008).

In 1947, civil rights activist A. Philip Randolph, along with colleague Grant Reynolds, renewed efforts to end discrimination in the military, forming the Committee Against Jim Crow in Military Service and Training, later renamed the League for Non-Violent Civil Disobedience Against Military Segregation. Truman's Order expanded on Executive Order 8802 by establishing equality of treatment and opportunity in the military for people of all races, religions, or national origins.

The order:

It is hereby declared to be the policy of the President that there shall be equality of treatment and opportunity for all persons in the armed services without regard to race, color, religion or national origin. This policy shall be put into effect as rapidly as possible, having due regard to the time required to effectuate any necessary changes without impairing efficiency or morale.

The order also established a committee to investigate and make recommendations to the civilian leadership of the military to implement the policy.

Army Chief of Staff Gen. Omar Bradley disliked the order, commenting that “[t]he Army is not out to make any social reforms." Bradley was forced by president Truman to issue a public apology.

The order eliminated Montford Point as a segregated Marine boot camp. It became a satellite facility of Camp Lejeune.

Most of the actual enforcement of the order was accomplished by President Dwight D. Eisenhower's administration (1953–1961), including the desegregation of military schools, hospitals, and bases. The last of the all-black units in the United States military was abolished in September 1954.

Kenneth Claiborne Royall, Secretary of the Army since 1947, was forced into retirement in April 1949 for continuing to refuse to desegregate the army nearly a year after President Truman's Order.

Fifteen years after Truman's order, on July 26, 1963, Secretary of Defense Robert McNamara issued Directive 5120.36 encouraging military commanders to employ their financial resources against facilities used by soldiers or their families that discriminated based upon sex or race.

In contravention to Truman's executive order, the United States complied with a non-public request from the Icelandic government not to station black soldiers on the US base in Keflavík, Iceland. During the Cold War, the Icelandic government requested that the U.S. refrain from stationing Black American troops at the Keflavik base in order to "protect" Icelandic women and preserve the country's racially and culturally homogeneous "national body". They did not want any interacial mixing of black men with Icelandic women. This unwritten policy lasted from the 1951 U.S.–Icelandic Defense Agreement until the ban was gradually phased out beginning in the 1960s, when black soldiers began to be stationed in Iceland, at first in limited numbers.
