= Rudder (surname) =

The surname Rudder may refer to:

- James Earl Rudder (1910–1970), United States Army major general, Texas Land Commissioner, and sixteenth president of Texas A&M University
- Christian Rudder (born 1975), American technology entrepreneur and writer known for co-founding the online dating service OkCupid
- David Rudder (born 1953), calypsonian Trinidadian
- John E. Rudder (1924–2006), first African-American officer in the regular US Marine Corps
- Michael Rudder (born 1950), Canadian actor
- Pieter De Rudder (1822–1898), farm labourer whose healed broken leg is considered one of the most famous recognized Lourdes miracles
- Samuel Rudder (c. 1726–1801), English topographer, printer and antiquarian
- Scott Rudder (born 1969), American politician
- Sean Rudder (born 1979), Australian former rugby league footballer
