= Directive 5120.36 =

1963 U.S. Department of Defense directive

Department of Defense Directive 5120.36 was issued in July 1963 by Robert McNamara, then United States Secretary of Defense. It dealt with the issue of racism in areas surrounding military communities. The directive declared:

It is the policy of the Department of Defense to conduct all of its activities in a manner which is free from racial discrimination, and which provides equal opportunity for all uniformed members and all civilian employees irrespective of their color. (para. I.)
The military departments shall... issue appropriate instructions, manuals and regulations in connection with the leadership responsibility for equal opportunity, on and off-base, and containing guidance for its discharge. (para. II.B.1.)
Every military commander has the responsibility to oppose discriminatory practices affecting his men and their dependents and to foster equal opportunity for them, not only in areas under his immediate control, but also in nearby communities where they may live or gather in off-duty hours. (para. II.C.)

The directive empowered commanding officers to use economic power to influence local businesses. With the approval of the Secretary of Defense, the commanding officer could declare an area off-limits to military personnel.

== Aftermath ==
The first non-military establishment was declared off-limits in 1967. In 1970, the requirement for commanding officers to obtain prior permission from the Secretary of Defense was lifted. A commanding officer could now declare housing areas off limits to military personnel under his command.
