= Montford Point Marine Association =

African-American veterans' organization

Montford Point Marine Association, Inc
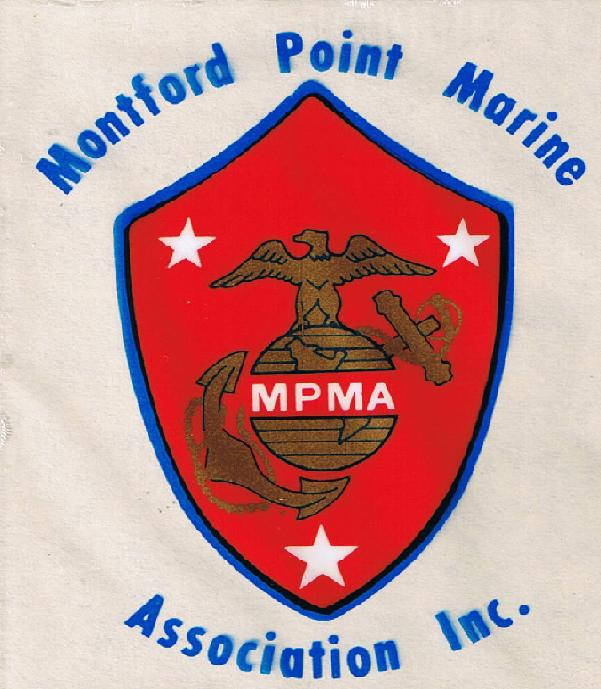
- Website: montfordpointmarines.org

The Montford Point Marine Association (MPMA) is a nonprofit military veterans' organization, founded to memorialize the legacy of the first African Americans to serve in the United States Marine Corps. The first African American U.S. Marines were trained at Camp Montford Point, in Jacksonville, North Carolina, from 1941 to 1949.

The organization supports educational assistance programs, veterans programs, and community services, with an emphasis on improving the social conditions of the growing population of military veterans who are disabled or senior citizens.

Membership in the nonprofit organization is open to veterans and active members of all branches of the U.S. Armed Forces regardless of race, creed, or national origin. The MPMA also hosts the MPMA Ladies Auxiliary. Membership in the Ladies Auxiliary is open to wives, daughters, sisters, and mothers of members or former members of the United States Armed Forces.

== History of Camp Montford Point ==
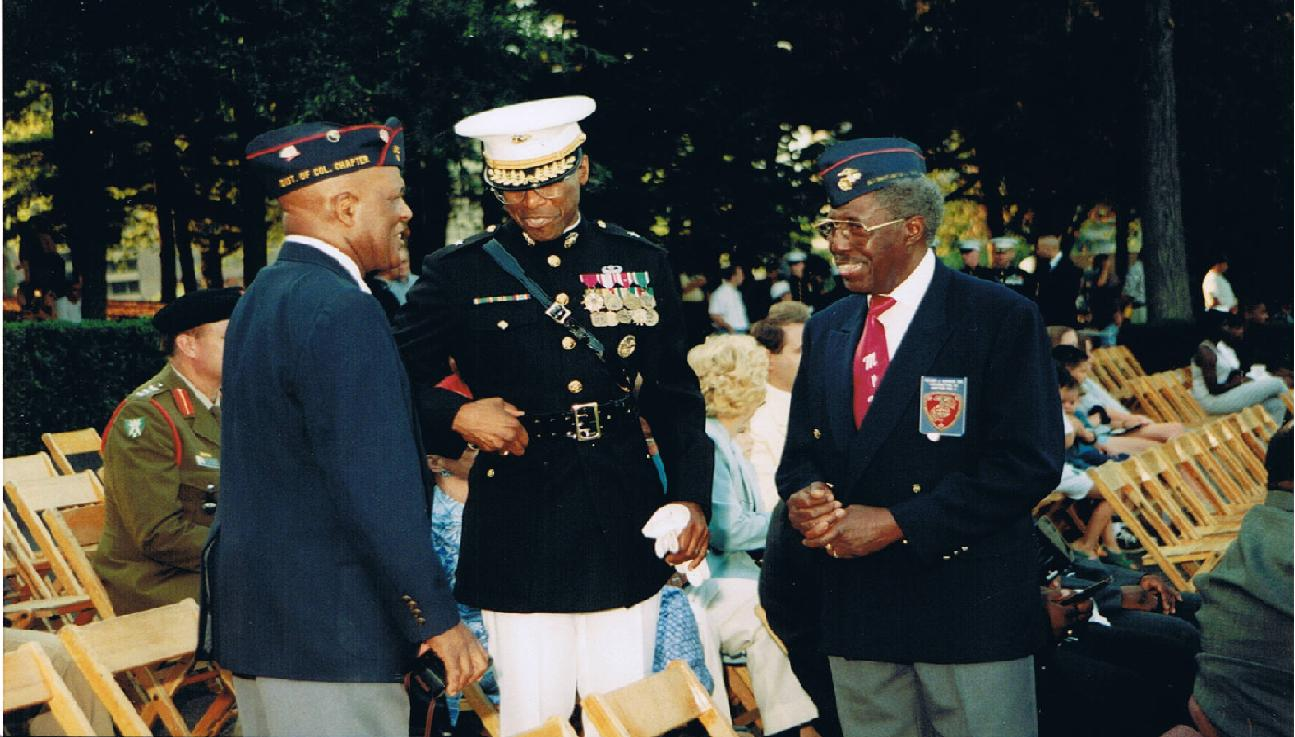
Reuben J. McNair Sr., and a fellow veteran of the Montford Point Marine Association, converses with a present-day African American Marine officer.

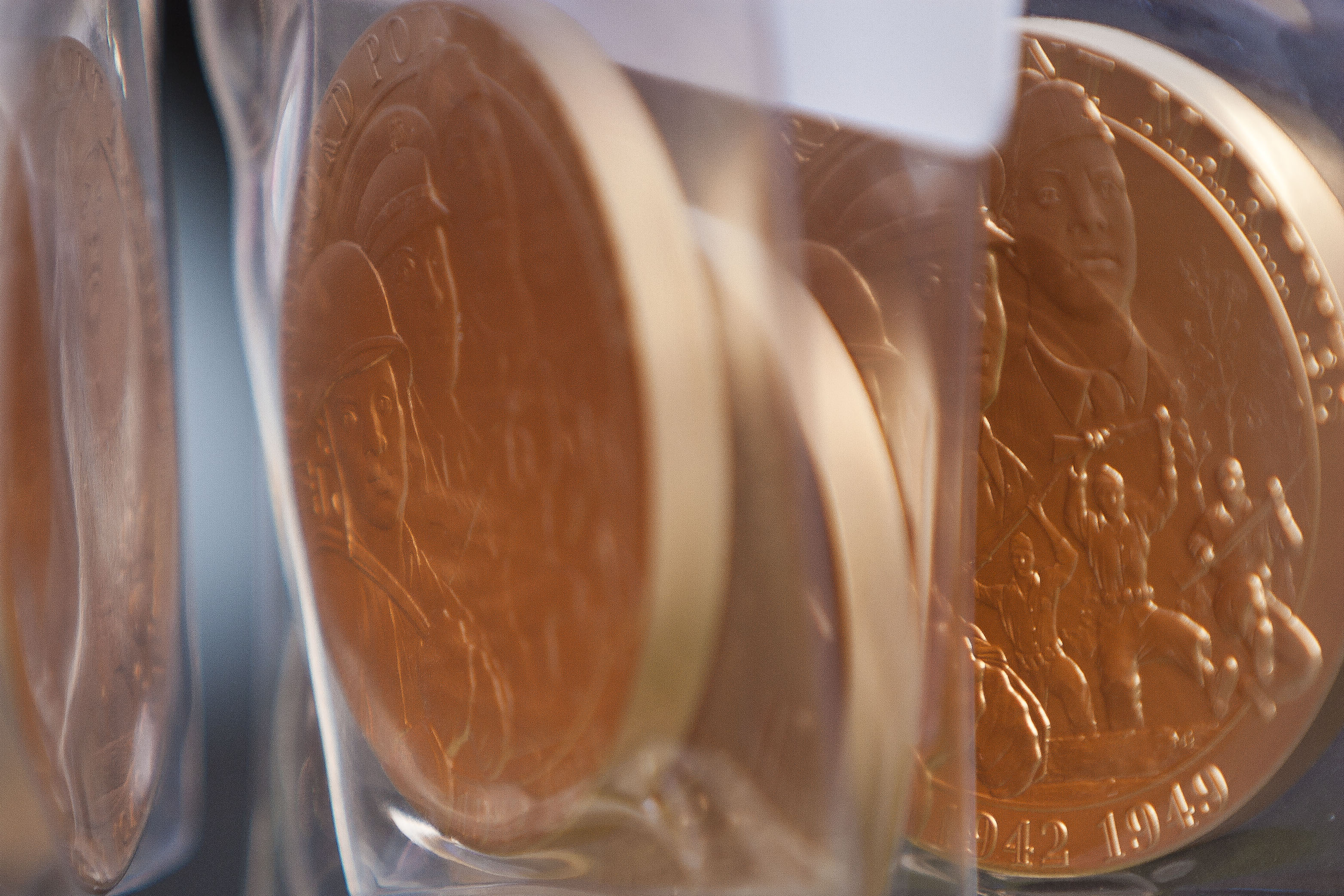
Montford Point Marines were guests of honor at Marine Barracks Washington in August 2011, bringing their story to the national forefront. On June 28, 2012, they were awarded replicas of a Congressional Gold Medal during a presentation ceremony at the historic parade grounds.

In 1940 while the United States prepared for war, millions of jobs in the defense industry were being created. Blacks seeking jobs in the growing defense industries suffered violence and discrimination. Many black leaders, including A. Philip Randolph, president of the Brotherhood of Sleeping Car Porters and the most widely known spokesperson for black working-class interests in the United States, met with Franklin D. Roosevelt and his administration to demand that he sign an executive order banning discrimination against black workers in the defense industry. Randolph threatened to bring tens of thousands of marchers to Washington, D.C. On June 25, 1941, days before the march was to occur, Roosevelt issued Executive Order 8802, which barred government agencies and federal contractors from refusing employment in industries engaged in defense production on the basis of race, creed, color, or national origin. It was the first Presidential decree issued on race since Reconstruction. The order required the armed services, including the Marine Corps, to recruit and enlist African Americans

Recruiting for the "Montford Marines" began on June 1, 1942. Thousands of African American men, eager to serve, flocked to recruiting offices. However, several recruitment offices wanted to claim the honor of having the first recruit, and on May 31, 1942 when a recruitment officer happened to be on the same City Hall elevator in downtown Oklahoma City with a young man wearing a Langston College sweater, he asked him if he would like to be the first Black Marine. That young man was Alfred Masters. At the time, Mr. Masters was twenty-six years old, had one daughter, Shirley Jean, and married to Isabell Arch. He was sworn into the Marine Corps on June 1, 1942 at 12:00 midnight with his wife by his side. Alfred Masters rose to the rank of Technical Sergeant.

The first black recruits received basic training at the segregated Camp Montford Point in Jacksonville, North Carolina. The 1,200 men in the quota were housed in prefabricated huts. Racism continued in the Marine Corps after the issuance of Executive Order 9981, reflecting that in the society. Railroad tracks divided white residents from the camp for African American troops, and the black recruits were not allowed to enter the main base of nearby Camp Lejeune unless accompanied by a white Marine. By 1945, all drill instructors and many NCOs at Montford Point were African Americans.

Between 1942 and 1949, more than 20,000 men were trained at Montford Point. In July 1948, despite strong opposition from Democrats of the segregated South, President Harry S. Truman signed Executive Order 9981, which required the desegregation of the military. In 1949 Montford Point was deactivated, and new black recruits were sent to Parris Island and Camp Pendleton. During the Korean War, the United States Marine Corps fully integrated.

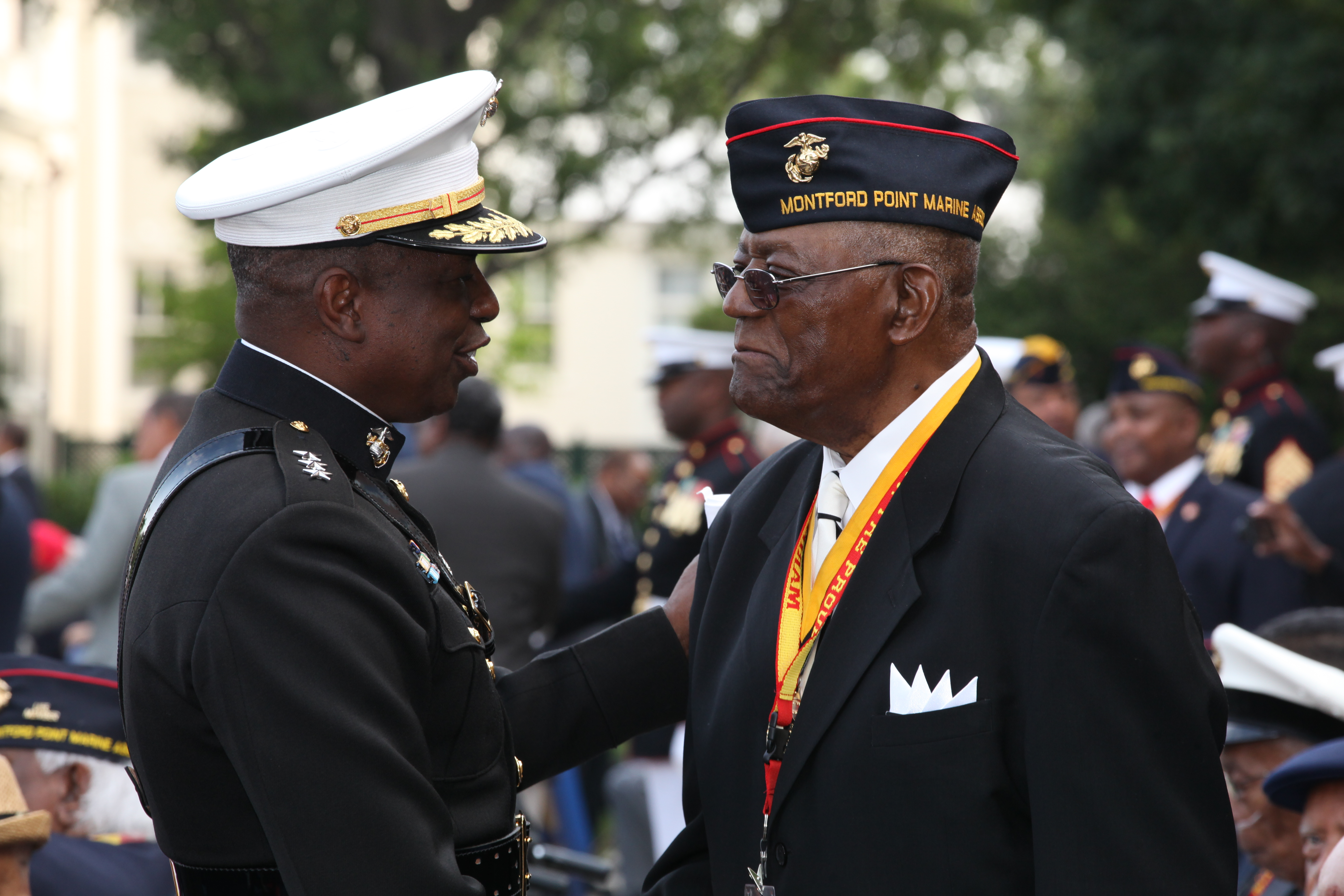
U.S. Marine Corps Lt. Gen. Walter E. Gaskin congratulates an original Montford Point Marine awarded the Congressional Gold Medal on June 27, 2012.

In 1965, a reunion of Marines was held in Philadelphia which included former Montford Point Marines along with Marines on active duty. With more than 400 Marines from throughout the United States gathered, they decided to establish the Montford Point Marine Association as a nonprofit veterans organization, to preserve military history and help people in need. The association has many chapters, and is a member of the Marine Corps Council, a council of Marine-related service groups.

The Montford Point Marine Association maintains archives, and the Montford Point Marines Museum at Camp Gilbert H. Johnson, Jacksonville, North Carolina. It holds an annual convention to celebrate the Montford Point Marines, make organizational decisions, and distribute scholarships.

On 27 June 2012, the Congressional Gold Medal was awarded to the Montford Point Marines.

== Notable Montford Point Marines ==
- Dan Bankhead
- Frederick C. Branch
- David Dinkins, former mayor of New York City
- Arthur Earley, Pennsylvania state representative
- Sergeant Major Gilbert "Hashmark" Johnson, one of the first African Americans to enlist and serve as a drill instructor in the Marine Corps
- Johnnie Johnson, pianist and collaborator with Chuck Berry
- Technical Sergeant Alfred Masters – The first African American in the United States Marine Corps
- Hari Rhodes, actor
- Clement Poussaint, brother of Alvin Poussaint
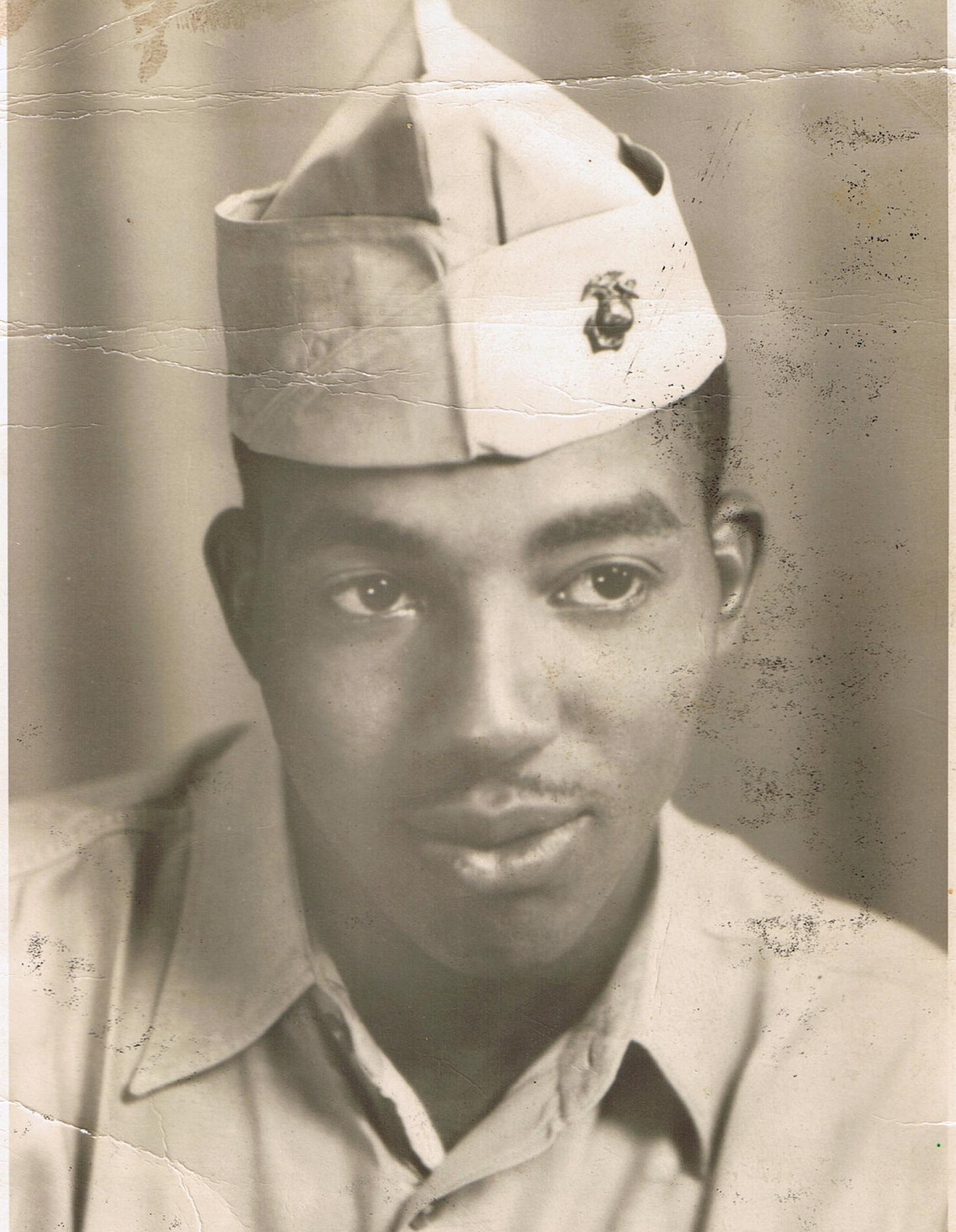
Training picture of Eugene Groves, one of the first African Americans to enlist in the United States Marine Corps and train at Montford Point

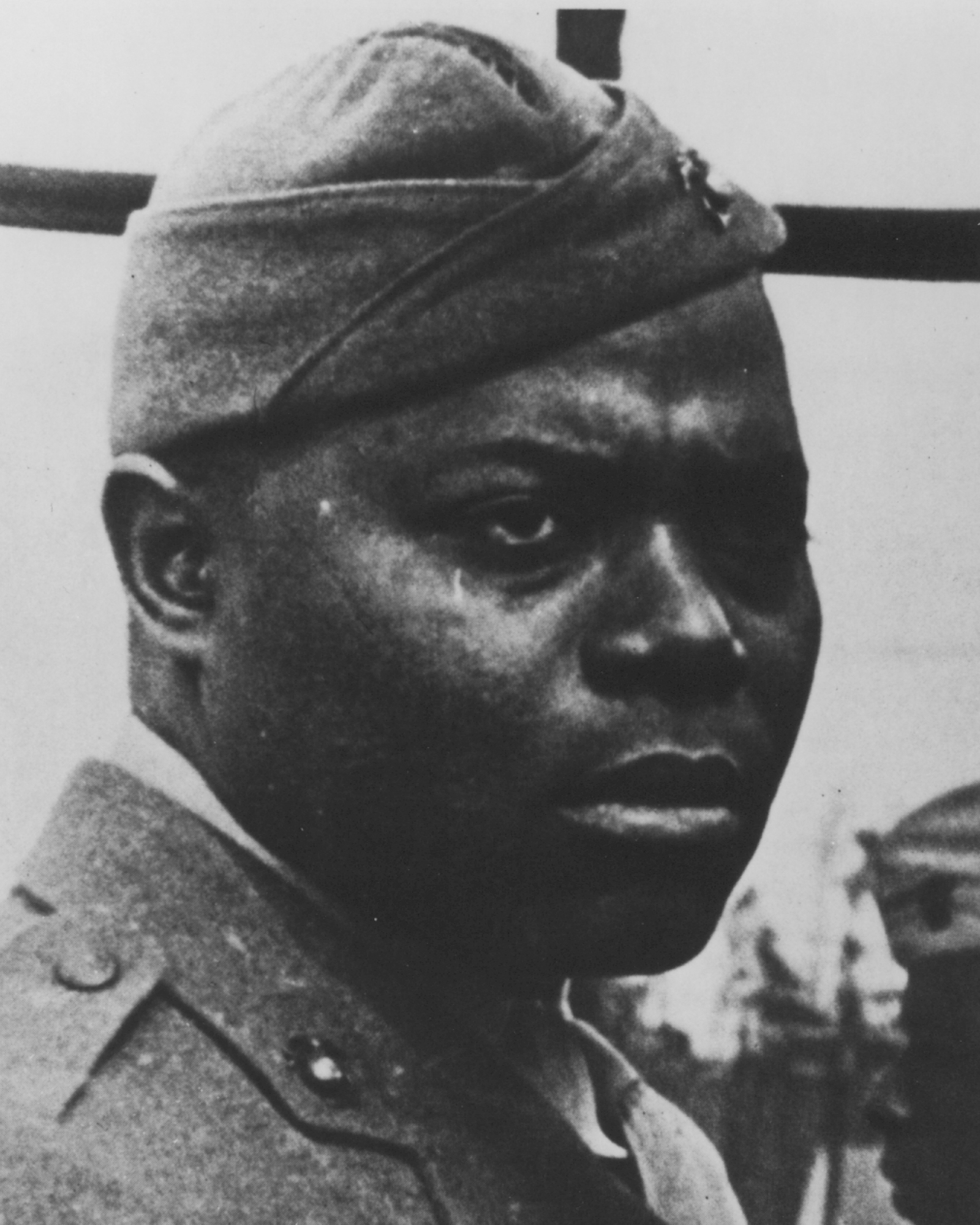
Sgt Maj Gilbert "Hashmark" Johnson, one of the first African American drill instructors in the Marine Corps

== Appearances in popular culture ==
The main character of the long-running crime drama NCIS, Leroy Jethro Gibbs is played by Mark Harmon and his character is named for his father's best friend, Leroy Jethro Moore, a Montford Point Marine (played by Billy Dee Williams). The character L.J. Moore was depicted receiving the Medal of Honor for his actions in the Pacific Theater of World War II, notably only receiving the medal after corrective actions were taken by U.S. Congress in 1996. A photo showing Williams shaking hands with President Bill Clinton was also displayed, lending some extra realism to the story. The episode titled The Namesake was the fifth episode of the tenth season and originally aired on CBS on October 30, 2012. The episode ends with a dedication to the Montford Point Marines.

The film Triumph Over Prejudice: The Montford Point Marines, directed by Daniel Bernardi in 2023, tells the story of how the Montford Point Marines rose to fight in some of history’s toughest battles amidst world wars and racial divides. In WWII, the Korean War, and the Vietnam War, these marines battled both prejudice and enemy fire. Triumph Over Prejudice illuminates their overlooked heroism, enduring spirit, and the indelible legacy they carved for future generations.
