= John E. Rudder =

John Earl Rudder
- Born: October 4, 1924; Paducah, Kentucky, U.S.
- Died: July 9, 2006 (aged 81); Paducah, Kentucky, U.S.
- Spouse: Doris
- Military career
- Allegiance: United States
- Branch: United States Marine Corps
- Service years: 1943—1949
- Rank: 2nd Lieutenant

John Earl Rudder (October 4, 1924 – July 9, 2006) became the first black Marine officer commissioned in the regular United States Marine Corps, in 1948 (though Frederick C. Branch became an officer in the Marine Corps Reserve in 1946).

He was born in Paducah, Kentucky. After serving as an enlisted Marine in World War II, he graduated from the Naval Reserve Officers' Training Corps. On May 28, 1948, he received his commission as a 2nd lieutenant, and entered the Marine Corps' Basic School at Marine Corps Base Quantico, Virginia, on August 25. He resigned in 1949. Though he experienced discrimination at Quantico, he stated his departure was for personal reasons, and the matter was handled quietly.

The Federal Bureau of Investigation (FBI), however, was skeptical and put him under long-term surveillance as a suspected communist, eventually accumulating eight volumes of material on the Rudder family by 1967. Settling in Washington, D.C., John Rudder - a Quaker - and his wife Doris became anti-war and anti-discrimination activists. The FBI caused trouble for their daughter Miriam many years later. As told to Morley Safer on the 60 Minutes segment "'Sins' of the Fathers ...", which aired on March 1, 1981, she was working as a file clerk for the United States House Select Committee on Assassinations, which was looking into the murders of John F. Kennedy and Martin Luther King Jr. In order for the chairman to obtain the documents he wanted, all committee employees had to get a security clearance. Miriam Rudder claimed she was denied one due to the FBI's suspicions about her parents.
