= Frederick C. Branch =

First African-American officer of the United States Marine Corps

Frederick Clinton Branch
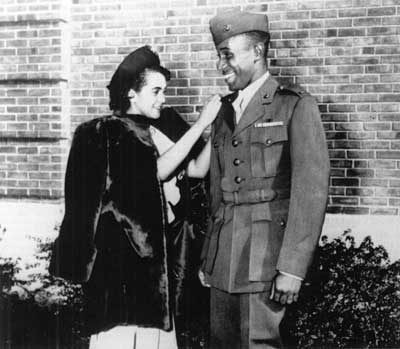
- Frederick C. Branch being pinned with his second lieutenant bars by his wife, Camilla "Peggy" Branch.
- Born: May 31, 1922; Hamlet, North Carolina, U.S.
- Died: April 10, 2005 (aged 82); Philadelphia, Pennsylvania, U.S.
- Burial place: Quantico National Cemetery, Quantico, Virginia
- Military career
- Allegiance: United States
- Branch: United States Marine Corps
- Service years: 1943–1955
- Rank: Captain
- Nickname: Fred
- Conflicts: World War II
- Other work: Science teacher

Frederick Clinton Branch (May 31, 1922 – April 10, 2005) was the first African-American officer of the United States Marine Corps.

== Early life and education ==
Branch was born in Hamlet, North Carolina, the fourth son of an African Methodist Episcopal Zion minister

After graduating from high school in Mamaroneck, New York, Branch attended Johnson C. Smith University in Charlotte, where he became a member of Kappa Alpha Psi fraternity. He then transferred to Temple University in Philadelphia.

== Marine Corps career ==
After receiving a draft notice from the Army in May 1943, he reported for induction to Fort Bragg, North Carolina, where he was chosen to become a Marine. In June 1941, President Franklin D. Roosevelt had opened the Marine Corps to African Americans through Executive Order 8802, which prohibited racial discrimination by any government agency. Previously, African Americans had been barred from Marine Corps service. He underwent training at Montford Point, North Carolina, along with other African-Americans (who became known as the "Montford Point Marines").

Branch applied for Officer Candidate School, but was initially denied. While serving with a supply unit in the Pacific, his performance earned him the recommendation of his commanding officer. He received his officer's training in the Navy V-12 program at Purdue University, the only African-American in a class of 250. There, he made the dean's list. He was commissioned as a second lieutenant on November 10, 1945. As World War II had ended, he went into the United States Marine Corps Reserve. (In 1948, John E. Rudder would become the first African-American officer in the regular Marine Corps.)

He was re-activated during the Korean War, serving at Camp Pendleton, California in command of an antiaircraft training platoon. He was discharged from active duty in 1952, returning to the Reserve, reaching the rank of captain. He left the Marine Corps in 1955, as he still experienced covert discrimination and promises for advanced training were not kept.

== Later civilian life ==
Having received a bachelor's degree in physics from Temple in 1947, he taught at Dobbins High School in Philadelphia until he retired in 1988.

Captain Branch died 10 April 2005 and was buried at Quantico National Cemetery in Quantico, Virginia.

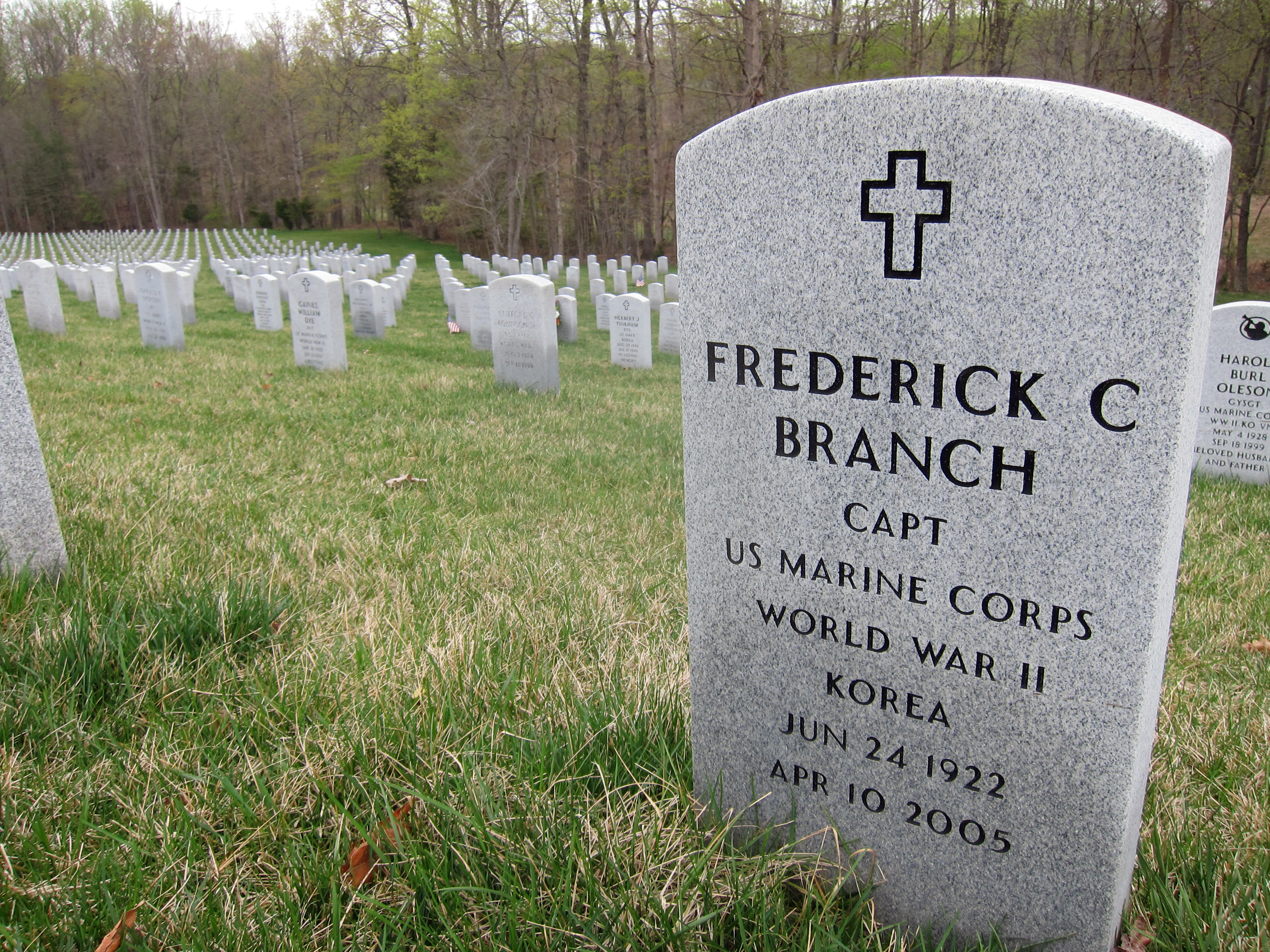
Headstone in Quantico National Cemetery

== Honors ==
In 1995, on the occasion of the 50th anniversary of his commissioning, a United States Senate resolution was passed honoring Branch.

In 1997, Branch was honored for his pioneering role in the integration of the Corps — a training building in the Marine Officer Candidate School in Quantico, Virginia is named in his honor.

On April 25, 2005, after his death, U.S. Senate resolution 116 was sponsored by North Carolina Senators Elizabeth Dole and Richard Burr "to commemorate the life, achievements, and contributions of Frederick C. Branch".

In 2006, the Marine Corps Recruiting Command created the Frederick C. Branch Leadership Scholarship. It is a Naval Reserve Officers Training Corps (NROTC) scholarship for students who are currently attending or have received letters of acceptance to one of 17 historically black colleges and universities that have NROTC programs on campus. A total of 68 scholarships are available per year. Each participating school may give two four-year scholarships, one three-year scholarship and one two-year scholarship. Graduates are commissioned as second lieutenants in the Marine Corps.

== See also ==
- Military history of African Americans
- List of African-American firsts
- Golden Thirteen, first African-American commissioned officers in the U.S. Navy
