= Camp Gilbert H. Johnson =

Satellite camp of Marine Corps Base Camp Lejeune

Coordinates: 34.7357°N 77.4072°W

Montford Point Camp
- Jacksonville, North Carolina, U.S.
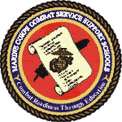
- MCCSSS logo

Site information
- Type: Military base
- Controlled by: United States Marine Corps

Site history
- Built: 1942
- In use: 1942–present

Garrison information
- Garrison: Recruit training

Camp Gilbert H. Johnson is a satellite camp of Marine Corps Base Camp Lejeune in Jacksonville, North Carolina, and home to the Marine Corps Combat Service Support Schools (MCCSSS), where various support military occupational specialties such as administration, supply, logistics, finance, Navy corpsman and motor transport maintenance are trained. Camp Johnson is situated on Montford Point, the site of recruit training for the first African Americans to serve in the Marine Corps, known as "Montford Point Marines".

== Mission ==
The purpose of the camp is to conduct formal resident training for officers and enlisted personnel in the occupational fields of logistics, motor transport, personnel administration, supply, and financial management (accounting and disbursing), as well as to conduct instructional management and combat water survival swim training. In addition to training Marines, Camp Johnson also houses the Field Medical Training Battalion, which trains corpsmen and religious program specialists of the Navy. The commanding officer of MCCSSS also serves as the area commander of Camp Johnson and provides administrative support to various tenant commands.

== History ==
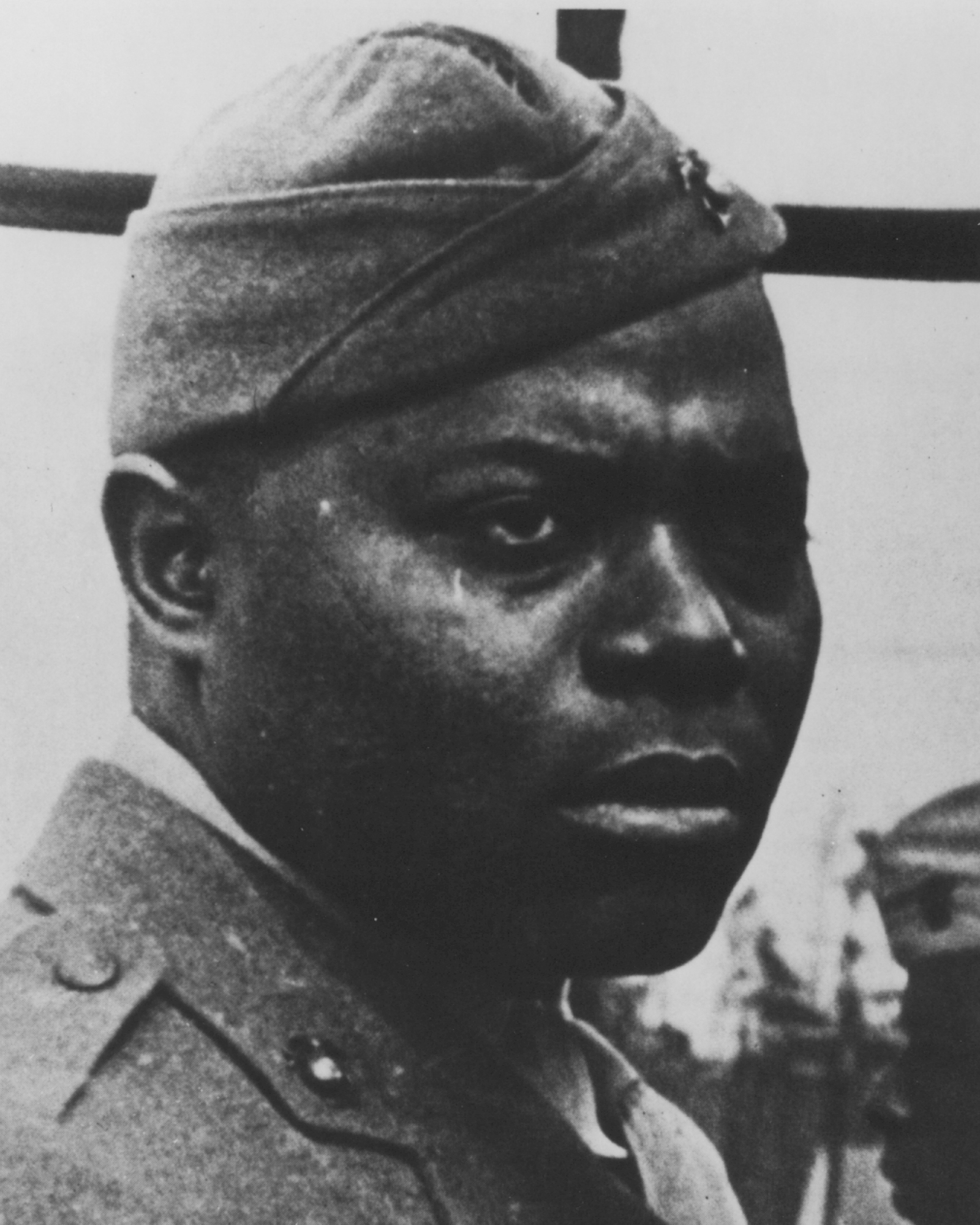
Sgt Maj Gilbert "Hashmark" Johnson

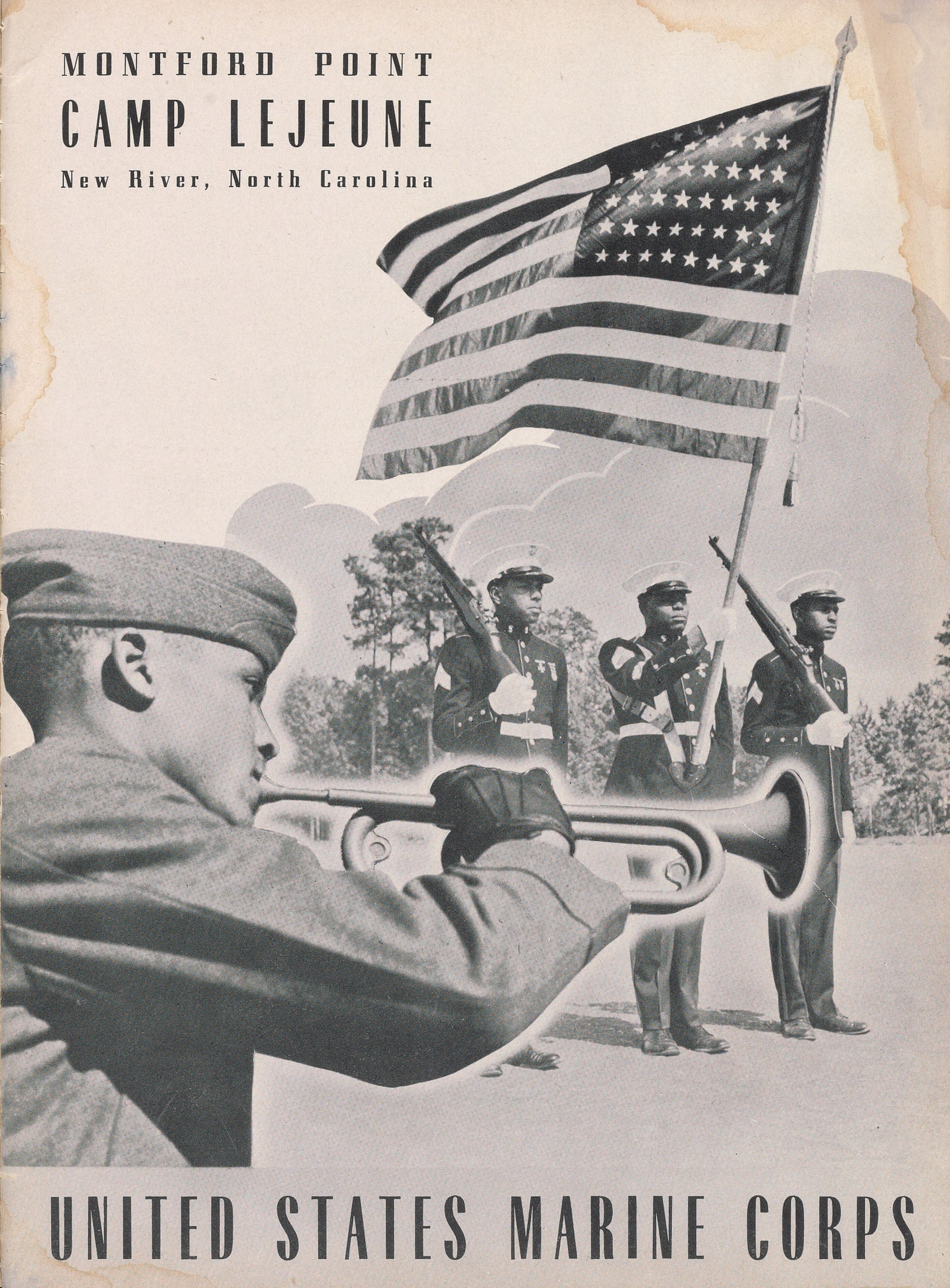
Inside cover of the 1943 Montford Point base annual.

When President Franklin D. Roosevelt signed Executive Order 8802, blacks were, for the first time, permitted to join the Marine Corps. Between 1942 and 1949, the camp at Montford Point was a recruit depot for black recruits, training 20,000 African Americans during that period. One of the first African Americans to enlist in the Marine Corps was Gilbert "Hashmark" Johnson, who became a drill instructor. Johnson served during World War II and the Korean War, ultimately receiving the rank of Sergeant Major.

In 1948, by Executive Order 9981, President Harry S. Truman ordered the military to integrate. In 1974, Montford Point was renamed Camp Gilbert H. Johnson. Camp Johnson became the home of the Marine Corps Combat Service Support Schools. In 2007, a documentary entitled The Montford Point Marine Project was released, honoring the black Marines who trained at Montford Point.

== Montford Point Marines Museum ==
Camp Johnson is home to the Montford Point Marines Museum. The museum is located in the East Wing of building M101. The museum houses items and pictures of the camp during its years as a boot camp.

== Memorials ==
Outside the gate of Camp Johnson stands a tribute to Marines, soldiers, and sailors who gave their lives trying to keep the peace in Lebanon. The Beirut Memorial is the site of an annual commemoration of the October 1983 Beirut barracks bombing, when 241 Marines, sailors, and soldiers were killed.

The camp is home to a "9/11" memorial, and a Vietnam War memorial. The "9/11" memorial features a beam salvaged from the tower wreckage. The memorial area is used for many ceremonies, from promotions to retirements. The recently built Vietnam Memorial consists of many thick glass panes erected from the ground in a circular shape. Each pane of glass is etched with the names of all the service men and women who gave their lives during the Vietnam War. In the center of the memorial is a large water fountain.

Directly across the street is the North Carolina Veterans Cemetery. This cemetery is the resting place of many Marine veterans. Funerals with military honors are done on site. Funeral details are provided by the personnel of MCCSSS, Camp Johnson, and neighboring units.

== See also ==
- Desegregation in the United States Marine Corps
- Montford Point Marine Association
- List of United States Marine Corps installations
- Military history of African Americans
- Frederick C. Branch
- USNS Montford Point the lead ship of her class of Expeditionary Transfer Docks (ESD)
