= Kenneth W. Benner =

U.S. Marine Corps Brigadier General

Kenneth Wachter Benner
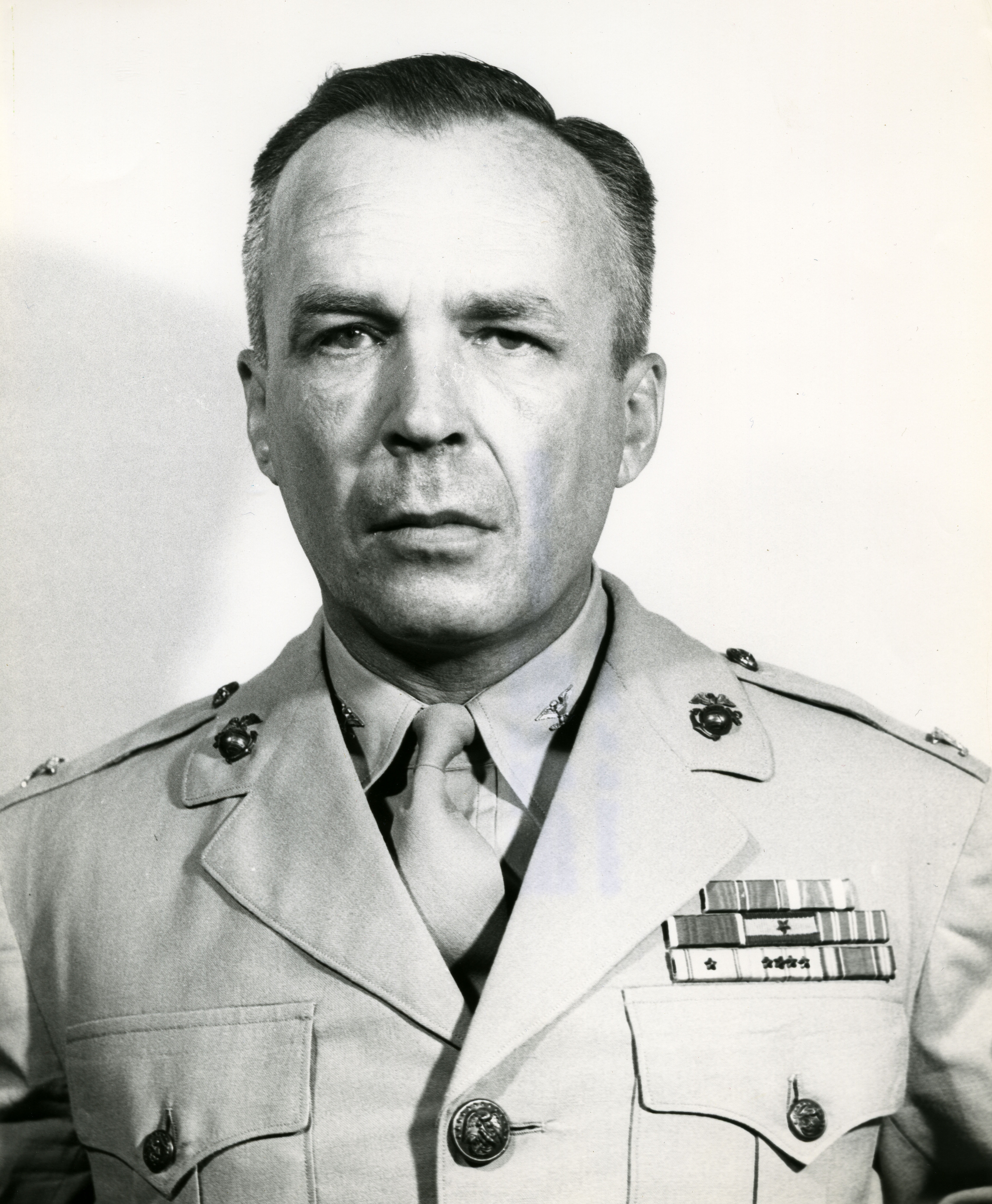
- Benner as Colonel, USMC
- Born: May 6, 1904; Piqua, Ohio, US
- Died: September 10, 1975 (aged 71); Columbus, North Carolina, US
- Burial place: Columbus, North Carolina, US
- Military career
- Allegiance: United States
- Branch: United States Marine Corps
- Service years: 1926–1956
- Rank: Brigadier general
- Service number: 0–4068
- Commands: 1st Provisional Antiaircraft Artillery Group; 3rd Defense Battalion
- Conflicts: Banana Wars; Nicaraguan Campaign; World War II; Attack on Pearl Harbor; Battle of Guadalcanal; Battle of Okinawa
- Awards: Bronze Star Medal; Navy Commendation Medal; Purple Heart

Kenneth Wachter Benner (May 6, 1904 – September 10, 1975) was a decorated officer in the United States Marine Corps with the rank of Brigadier general. A graduate of the United States Naval Academy, he trained as Anti-Aircraft Artillery officer and participated in the Defense of Pearl Harbor, Guadalcanal Campaign and Battle of Okinawa.

== Early career ==
Kenneth W. Benner was born on May 6, 1904, in Piqua, Ohio, the son of realtor and merchant Walter Phillip Benner and his wife Daisy. He graduated from the Piqua High School in summer 1921 and worked for one year as a reporter for the Piqua Dailly Call, before receiving an appointment to the United States Naval Academy at Annapolis, Maryland. While at the Academy, Benner was active in the academy orchestra.

Benner graduated with Bachelor of Science degree on June 3, 1926, and was commissioned a second lieutenant in the Marine Corps. He was subsequently ordered to the Basic School at Philadelphia Navy Yard for basic officer training, which he completed in February 1927 and remained in Philadelphia until the end of August that year, when he was attached to the 1st Brigade of Marines and embarked for Haiti.

He participated in the patrolling against Caicos bandits until September 1929, when he was ordered back to the United States and attached to the Marine Corps Base San Diego. By the end of June 1930, Benner was ordered to Hawaii, where he was assigned to the Marine Barracks at Pearl Harbor Navy Yard. He was promoted to First lieutenant on September 1, 1931, and embarked with 2nd Brigade of Marines to Nicaragua.

In March 1933, Benner returned stateside and assumed duty with the Marine Barracks at Naval Station Great Lakes, Illinois. He served in this capacity until July 1935, when he was ordered to the Army Coast Artillery School at Fort Monroe, Virginia. Benner completed a one-year course there in the summer of the following year and was promoted to Captain on June 30, 1936. He was subsequently ordered to the Marine Corps Schools, Quantico, where he served as an instructor of anti-aircraft artillery until April 1940.

He was subsequently ordered to Hawaii and joined the Marine Barracks at Pearl Harbor Navy Yard, where he participated in the newly established Marine defense battalions program. Marine defense battalions, special Marine units, which were designated the defense force of the Pacific naval bases and should be placed on Midway Atoll, Wake Island, Johnston Atoll, and Palmyra Atoll. Benner was ordered with a detachment of one officer, eight enlisted marines, and two navy hospital corpsmen, to Midway Atoll in July 1940 and relieved Captain Samuel G. Taxis and his detail. He was tasked with the reconnaissance and survey required for the antiaircraft defense of the Island. He was promoted to Major on September 1, 1940.

== World War II ==
Benner then served as Battery Commander the similar duties on Wake Island until November 1941, when he was appointed Commanding officer of the 3-inch Antiaircraft Group and the Headquarters and Service Battery of the 3rd Defense Battalion under Colonel Robert H. Pepper. He was present at Pearl Harbor during Japanese attack on December 7, 1941, and commanded his group during the defense combats.

Benner then assumed command of 90mm Anti Aircraft Group of twelve guns and accompanied his unit to Guadalcanal in mid-August 1942 with the task of the anti-aircraft protection of Henderson Field captured by Marines few days earlier. He was wounded by enemy fire on August 29, 1942 and evacuated to New Caledonia for treatment. Moreover, Benner got infected with Malaria and was hospitalized for several months. For his wounds on Guadalcanal, he was decorated with Purple Heart. He was promoted to the temporary rank of lieutenant colonel on August 7, 1942, and assumed command of 3rd Defense Battalion on May 15, 1943. His battalion was stationed on Guadalcanal, which was transformed to the Army-Navy Base.

Lieutenant colonel Benner was ordered to Hawaii in August 1943 and was appointed a member of the Joint Staff, Commander-in-Chief, U.S. Pacific Fleet under Admiral Chester Nimitz. He served in the Planning section, Logistics Division until December 1944, and was decorated with Navy Commendation Medal by Nimitz for preparation of plans for advanced bases in the Central Pacific area, captured from the Japanese. He also headed subsection which was responsible for the execution of base development plans in the captured areas. He was responsible for the co-ordination of Army, Navy and Marine Corps efforts in the disposition of forces required for the operation and maintenance of the advance bases.

He was subsequently promoted to Colonel and appointed Commanding officer, 1st Provisional Antiaircraft Artillery Group on Kauai, Hawaii. His command was formed by III Marine Amphibious Corps and consisted of the 2nd, 5th, 8th, and 16th Antiaircraft Artillery Battalions. Benner led his Group during the Okinawa Campaign and as Senior Anti-Aircraft Artillery officer, he was responsible for the coordinating the disposition and operation of his organic radar with that of the Air Warning Squadrons in order to ensure maximum surface and low angle electronic surveillance for defense against enemy air attacks. By the end of April 1945, his Anti-Aircraft Artillery group was responsible mainly for the defense of the area around Yomitan Airfield and Kadena Air Base. Benner was decorated with Bronze Star Medal for his service on Okinawa.

== Postwar service ==
Following the War, Benner was ordered to Washington, D.C., where he was appointed to the Personnel Division, Headquarters Marine Corps under Major general John T. Walker. He served as Assistant Director of Personnel for several months in 1950 and later was ordered to the Coronado, California, where he joined the headquarters of Amphibious Training Command, Pacific Fleet under Brigadier general John T. Selden.

He later served as Commanding officer, Marine Barracks at Brooklyn Navy Yard until 1955, when he was appointed Commanding officer, Service Battalion at Camp Lejeune, North Carolina. Benner remained in this capacity until June 30, 1956, when he retired from active service and was advanced to the rank of brigadier general for having been specially commended in combat.

Upon his retirement from the Marine Corps, Benner settled in Columbus, North Carolina, where he died on September 10, 1975, aged 71. He was buried at Columbus Presbyterian Cemetery together with his wife, Evelyn Ennett Benner. They had two sons: Kenneth Jr. (1948–1959) and Gerald (USNA Class of 1955); and a daughter.

== Decorations ==
The ribbon bar of Brigadier General Benner:

1st Row	Bronze Star Medal	Navy Commendation Medal	Purple Heart
2nd Row	Navy Presidential Unit Citation with one star	Second Nicaraguan Campaign Medal	American Defense Service Medal with Base Clasp
3rd Row	Asiatic-Pacific Campaign Medal with four 3/16 inch service stars	World War II Victory Medal	National Defense Service Medal

== See also ==
- Marine defense battalions
- Battle of Okinawa

Military offices
Preceded by Harold C. Roberts	Commanding Officer, 3rd Defense Battalion; May 15, 1943 – August 12, 1943	Succeeded by Samuel G. Taxis
