= 1st Provisional Antiaircraft Artillery Group =

1st Provisional AAA Group
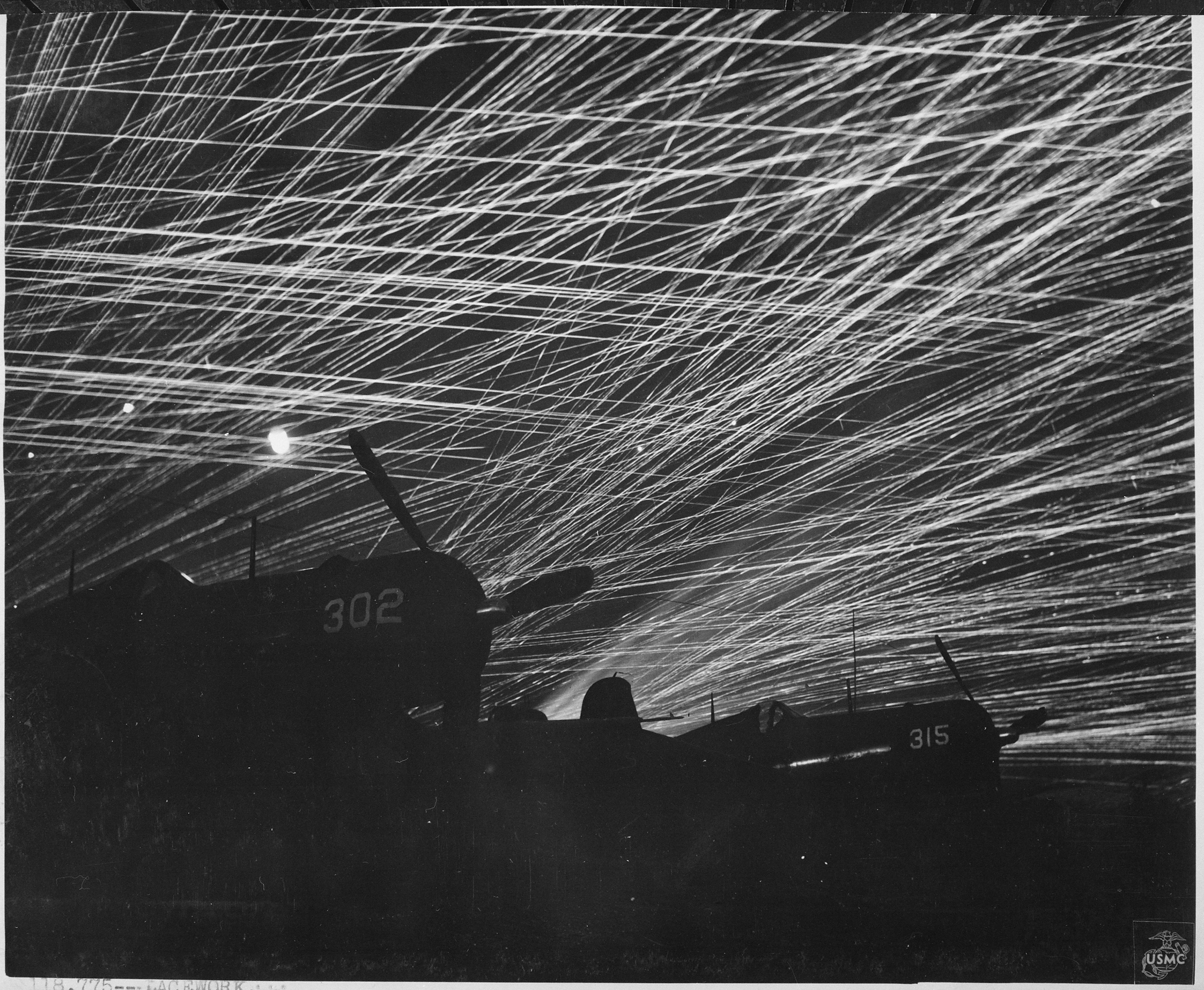
- Anti-aircraft fire from Marine AAA Battalions in the vicinity of Yontan Airfield lace the sky during the Battle of Okinawa.
- Active: 1 Nov 1944 – 5 Dec 1945
- Country: United States of America
- Branch: United States Marine Corps
- Type: Anti-aircraft warfare
- Size: ~5400 personnel
- Engagements: Battle of Okinawa

Commanders
- Current commander: N/A
- Notable commanders: Henry R. Paige; Kenneth W. Benner

The 1st Provisional Antiaircraft Artillery Group was a provisional unit that served as the headquarters for all United States Marine Corps antiaircraft battalions that participated in the Battle of Okinawa. The group was formed on Kauai, Territory of Hawaii in November 1944 under the command of the III Marine Amphibious Corps. For the Battle of Okinawa, the group was under the command of the 53d Antiaircraft Artillery Brigade of the Tenth United States Army and was responsible for air defense of the area surrounding Yontan & Kadena Airfields. Following the end of the war, the group returned to the United States and was decommissioned on December 5, 1945. To date, no other Marine Corps unit has carried the group's lineage and honors

== History ==
=== Organization ===
The 1st Provisional Antiaircraft Artillery Group was commissioned on November 1, 1944, in Kauai, Territory of Hawaii by the authority of Fleet Marine Force, Pacific (FMFPAC), Special Order Number 75-44. It was formed as the antiaircraft headquarters for the III Amphibious Corps. On November 11 the group assumed tactical control of the 2d, 5th, 8th, 10th, and 16th Antiaircraft Artillery Battalions. The 10th AAA Battalion was detached from the group on November 25, 1944, when it was decommissioned by authority of FMFPAC, Special Order Number 104-44.

=== Training, embarkation, and movement west ===
Prior to the group forming, the 5th and 8th Antiaircraft Artillery Battalions had returned from deployments to Funafuti and Apamama and had been conducting extensive air defense training for most of 1944. Training for the group's battalions consisted of firing air defense artillery and automatic weapons at towed target sleeves, drones and waterborne targets, field artillery exercises, and training in radar and radar countermeasures. In December 1944, the 2d and 8th Antiaircraft Battalions were tasked with temporarily augmenting antiaircraft defenses in forward areas prior to the group's next amphibious operation. The 5th Antiaircraft Battalion was sent to Guam while the 16th was sent to Tinian.

On January 17, 1945, the group headquarters boarded the USS Meriwether (APA-203) for transport to Pearl Harbor arriving on January 19. On January 20, the group received FMFPAC Special Order Number 25-45 ordering movement to Saipan. The group's equipment departed Pearl Harbor on January 28 on board the SS Donald M. Dickinson while the group's personnel departed a day later on the SS Typhoon from Honolulu Harbor. The group's personnel arrived off the coast of Eniwetok Atoll on February 6 and they remained there until February 12. The convoy arrived at Saipan on February 16. On March 14, the group's headquarters began loading USS LST-641 in Tanapag Harbor.

=== Battle of Okinawa ===
For the Battle of Okinawa the 1st Provisional Antiaircraft Group was tasked with providing antiaircraft defenses for Yontan Airfield and the III Marine Amphibious Corps beaches in the Yontan Area, Southern Okinawa.

On D-Day, April 1, the assault echelons of the Group Headquarters and the 2d and 16th Antiaircraft Battalions were loaded onto seven Landing Ship, Tanks (LST). During the assault, the first antiaircraft artillery battalions ashore were initially placed under the tactical control of the division they were assigned to support. The assault echelon of the 2nd Antiaircraft Artillery Battalion was tasked with supporting the 6th Marine Division while the assault echelon of the 16th was in direct support of the 1st Marine Division. The battalions were delayed coming ashore because the landing beaches were not good and the Marine Corps prioritized other assault units before them. Reconnaissance parties were finally able to get ashore on April 3 however the majority of personnel and equipment from both of these battalions did not start flowing ashore until April 8 with both battalions being fully operational by April 12. On April 20, operational and tactical control of the 1st Provisional AAA Group was transferred from III MAC to the 53rd AAA Brigade under Tenth Army AAA. The first echelon of the 8th AAA Battalion arrived on April 17 coming ashore at Nago on the neck of the Motobu Peninsula. The battalion completed offloading on April 20 and was fully operational capable y April 22. the 8th AAA Battalion was followed by the 5th AAA Battalion on May 5 which also established positions in the vicinity of Yontan and Kadena Airfields. On May 8, the 53rd AAA Brigade, higher headquarters for the group, issued an order that antiaircraft battalions were now expected to use only variable time fuses for 90mm antiaircraft ammunition.

Some of the heaviest air raids of the battle occurred on the evening of 24-25 May during the Giretsu Kuteitai raid on Yontan Airfield. That evening, five Imperial Japanese Army Mitsubishi Ki-21 (Allied reporting name "Sally") bombers headed for the Yontan-Kadena area. Four of these planes were shot down by the guns of the 1st Provisional AAA Group. One of the Japanese planes crash landed on Yontan Airfield and 10-12 Japanese commandos escaped. Before they were all killed, the commandoes were able to destroy or damage thirty eight aircraft.

From April to July 1945 the Group was credited with destroying 31.5 Japanese aircraft, probably destroying 6 more and damaging 23.

=== Post war and decommissioning ===
On October 1, the 1st Provisional AAA Group was transferred under the command of the Commanding General, Service, Command, Fleet Marine Force, Pacific. On October 4, the group received FMFPac Special Order 334-5 authorizing the group and its subordinate battalions to return to the United States. On October 9, Typhoon Louise struck Okinawa causing extensive damage to deployed American Forces. There were three Marines from the Group that sustained minor injuries while the group and its battalions lost 50-75% of tents and buildings.

The Group Headquarters began embarking on the USS Meriwether (APA-203) on October 22 and set sail the next day for the United States. The Group arrived in San Diego on November 8, 1945, and reported to Marine Corps Base Camp Pendleton, California. The 1st Provisional Antiaircraft Artillery Group as officially decommissioned on December 5, 1945, by the authority of Area Special Order Number 354-45.

== Commanding Officers ==
The following officers served as Commanding Officer of the 1st Provisional Antiaircraft Group:

- Colonel Henry R. Paige (November 1, 1944 - December 6, 1944)
- Colonel Kenneth W. Benner (December 7, 1944 - August 30, 1945)
- Lieutenant Colonel Charles T. Tingle (August 31, 1945 - October 21, 1945)
- Major Walter L. Eddy Jr. (October 22, 1945 - December 5 1945)

== Notable members ==
- William J. Van Ryzin - Group Executive Officer (November 22, 1944 - March 16, 1945)

== Unit awards ==
A unit citation or commendation is an award bestowed upon an organization for the action cited. Members of the unit who participated in said actions are allowed to wear on their uniforms the awarded unit citation. The 1st Provisional Antiaircraft Artillery Group has been presented with the following awards:

| Streamer | Award | Year(s) | Additional Info |
|---|---|---|---|
| A streamer with red, gold, and blue horizontal stripes with a bronze star in the center | Presidential Unit Citation Streamer | 1945 | Okinawa |
| | Asiatic-Pacific Campaign Streamer | | Okinawa |
| | World War II Victory Streamer | 1941–1945 | Pacific War |

== See also ==
- Marine Defense Battalions
- List of United States Marine Corps aviation support units
