= Raid on Yontan Airfield =

Japanese military operation

- Part of Battle of Okinawa
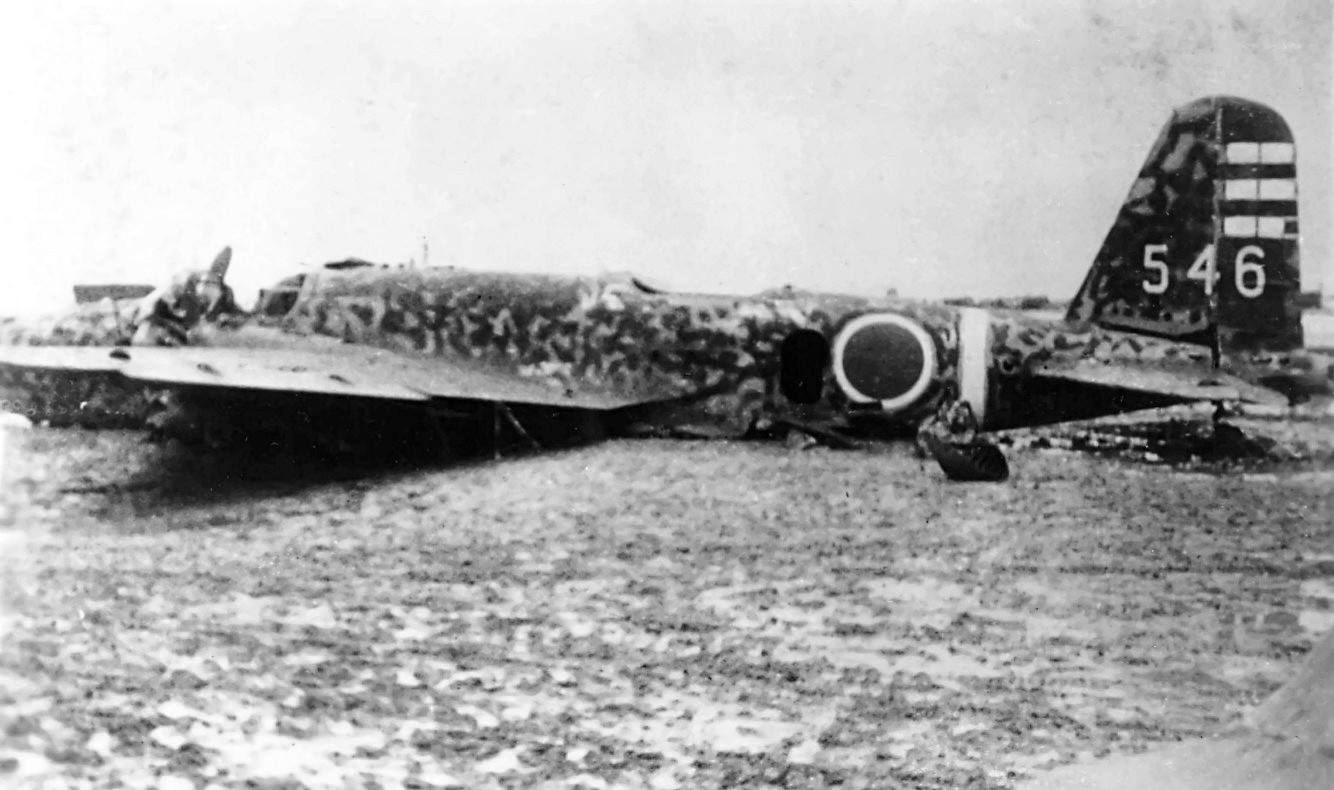
- Ki-21-IIb of the Daisan Dokuritsu Hikōtai at Yontan Airfield, 25 May 1945
Date	24–25 May 1945
Location	Yontan Airfield, Okinawa 26°23′48″N 127°44′37″E
Result	American victory

Belligerents
United States	Japan

Commanders and leaders
(United States) Francis P. Mulcahy	(Empire of Japan) Michio Okuyama

Strength
Unknown	12 Mitsubishi Ki-21; 136 commandos

Casualties and losses
4 killed 27 wounded 3 fighters destroyed 2 bombers destroyed 4 cargo planes destroyed 25 fighters damaged 2 bombers damaged 2 cargo planes damaged	69+ killed 8 Ki-21s destroyed or crashed

The Raid on Yontan was an Empire of Japan military operation carried out on the night of May 24–25, 1945 against Yontan Airfield on Okinawa. The airfield was recently seized by American forces during the first day of the Battle of Okinawa and was being used by United States Marine Corps and Army Air Force squadrons. Five Imperial Japanese Army Mitsubishi Ki-21 (Allied reporting name "Sally") bombers, carrying Giretsu Kuteitai special airborne attack troops, conducted a suicide raid against Kadena and Yontan airfields on Okinawa. Four were shot down, but the fifth belly landed on the principal runway at Yontan allowing 10-12 giretsu troops to disembark on the airfield. The raid resulted in the destruction or damage to 38 American aircraft and 70,000 gallons of fuel. However, its overall value was minimal because Yontan Airfield was reopened at 0800 the following morning with little effect to overall Allied aviation operations.

== Background ==
=== Japan ===
After United States Amy Air Force B-29 Superfortress strategic bombers began attacks on Tokyo from bases in the Mariana Islands, the 1st Raiding Brigade of the Teishin Shudan was ordered to form a commando unit for a "special operations" mission to attack and destroy the bombers on the Aslito Airfield on Saipan. Captain Michiro Okuyama, commander of the brigade's engineering company and trained in sabotage and demolition was selected as mission leader. He selected an additional 126 men from his own team (1st Teishin-Dan 1st Regiment 4th Company) to form the first Giretsu Airborne Unit. It was initially organized with a command section and five platoons and one independent squad, based at the Imperial Japanese Army's air academy at Saitama. The group unit also included eight intelligence officers and two radio men from the Nakano School.

Giretsu operations were to be undertaken at night, beginning with air strikes by bombers. After this, commando units would be inserted onto the target airfield by crash landing their transports. The fact that there was no provision for extraction of the strike force, along with the rejection of surrender in Japanese military doctrine at the time, meant that the Giretsu ground operations were effectively suicide attacks.

The attack against the Marianas was scheduled for December 24, 1944, but was called off after American raids damaged the planned refueling airfields on Iwo Jima. After the Marianas raid was cancelled plans were made to attack airfields on Iwo Jima captured by the United States Marine Corps in March, but these too were cancelled when the Iwo Jima garrison fell.

On April 1, US forces landed on Okinawa, and American fighters based on carriers and on Okinawa's west coast were intercepting and destroying nearly 60% of the kamikaze aircraft attacking the American fleet. In the middle of April, the Sixth Air Army requested the deployment of the Giretsu Special Forces to neutralize these airfields, in what was designated "Operation Gi-gou". On May 18, the operation was authorized.

=== United States ===
The United States created the Tenth Army, a cross-branch force consisting of the U.S. Army's XXIV Corps (7th, 27th, 77th and 96th Infantry Divisions) with the United States Marine Corps III Amphibious Corps (1st, 2nd, and 6th Marine Divisions) to seize the island of Okinawa. The Tenth was unique in that it had its own Tactical Air Force (TAF) (joint Army-Marine command) and was also supported by combined naval and amphibious forces. Opposing the Allied forces on the ground was the Japanese Thirty-Second Army.

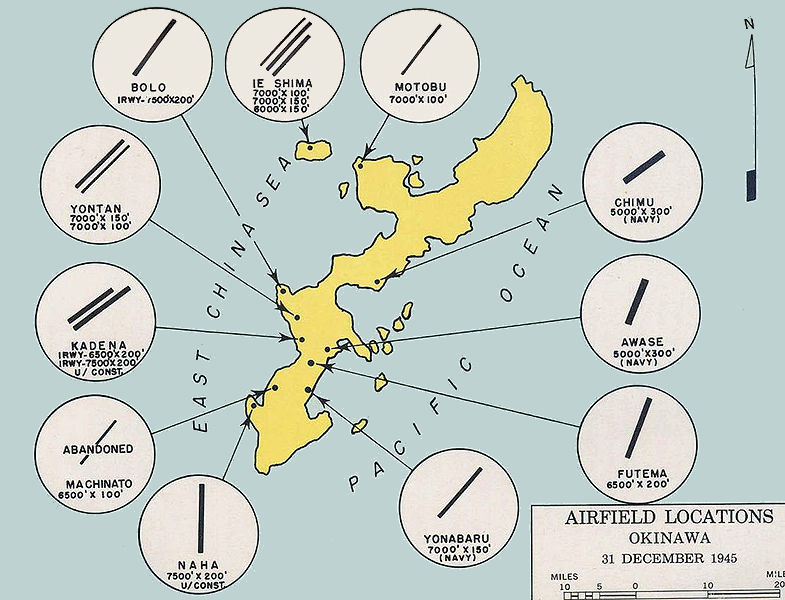
Location of Yontan Airfield

US forces landed on Okinawa on April 1, 1945, in what was the largest amphibious assault in the Pacific Theater of World War II. The main landing was made on the Hagushi beaches on the western coast of Okinawa. Tenth Army swept across the south-central part of the island with relative ease, capturing the Kadena and the Yomitan airbases within hours of the landing. Engineers immediately began to expand and repair the runways. The first TAF aircraft to come ashore on Okinawa were Marine Corps OY-1 Grasshoppers from VMO-2 on April 2. Marine Aircraft Group 31 (MAG-31) was the first Marine air group ashore landing on Yontan Airfield on April 7. Flying in from the escort carriers USS Sitkoh Bay and the USS Breton (CVE-23), the group was able to immediately put 80 of 109 F4U Corsairs into the fight and maintained a combat air patrol (CAP) from 1750 until dark to aid in the fight against the kamikaze attacks that were devastating the American fleet. Marine Aircraft Group 33 was next ashore on April 9. On April 14, responsibility for providing CAP aircraft for Okinawa was transferred from the Navy's Task Force 58 to the TAF. That same day TAF was also tasked with providing an additional two plane CAP's for three of the Navy's radar picket stations.

By the end of April the TAF had two Marine Aircraft Groups ashore giving it six F4U Corsair squadrons and two night fighter squadrons equipped with Grumman F6F Hellcats TAF initially maintained a CAP of 12 aircraft overhead however as the kamikaze threat grew it increased to 32 aircraft overhead with an additional 12 aircraft on ground alert. For the month, TAF aircraft flew 3,521 combat air patrols sorties and were responsible for assisting in the shooting down of 143 enemy aircraft.

May 1945 saw TAF strength increased with the addition of Marine Aircraft Group 22 and the 318th Fighter Group. With the additional aircraft assigned the combat air patrols were pushed further north of Okinawa.

== Preparation and organization ==
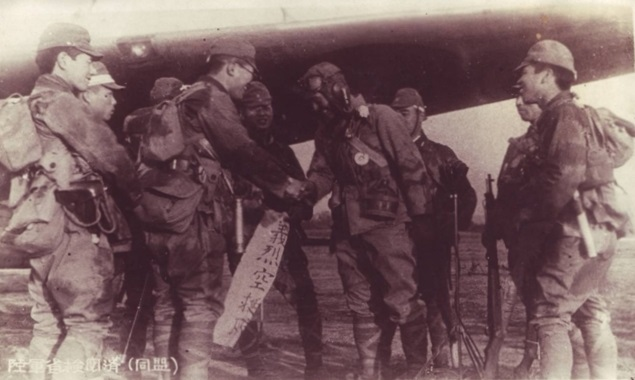
Captain Okuyama and Giretsu Airborne unit depart on their mission to Okinawa

The Japanese Sixth Air Army began preparations for the attack in early May. Led by Captain Okuyama, the raid force moved from Nishitsukuba to Kumamoto as it continued to prepare for the assault. Aircraft for the raid came from the Third Independent Air Unit based in the vicinity of Hamamatsu. The raid force consisted of 120 commandos broken up into a headquarters section and five flights, each containing twenty men. They were to be transported by twelve Mitsubishi Ki-21s stripped of their guns and with additional forward and rear exits added to assist raiders with exiting. The timing of the raid was also meant to coincide with the withdrawal of Lieutenant General Mitsuru Ushijima's 32nd Army from the Shuri Line in southern Okinawa.

On May 18, Imperial Japanese Army headquarters approved the operation and issued orders for it to take place on May 23. The raid was to precede as part of Operation Kikusui VII, one of a number of large Kamikaze attacks flown against US forces in the vicinity of Okinawa. Operations on May 23 were cancelled due to poor weather in the vicinity of the target airfield.

== Execution of the raid ==
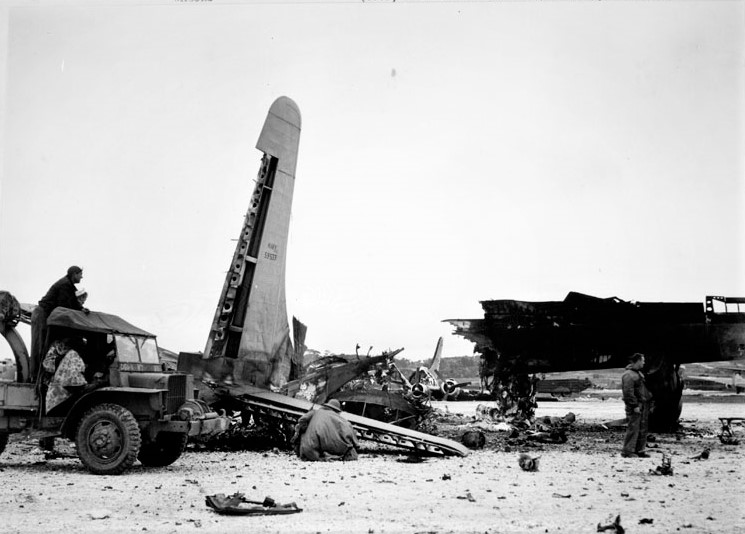
Wrecked U.S. planes after attack on Yontan Airfield

Twelve Japanese bombers departed from an airfield near Kengun, Japan on the evening of May 24 with 136 commandos aboard. The flight to Okinawa would take 4 hours. Each plane had its flight crew and 12 commandoes aboard. Shortly after take-off, four planes developed engine trouble and returned to base. Three more of the bombers were successfully intercepted by American night fighters while en route to Okinawa.

List of Aircraft Types Destroyed & Damaged During 24–25 May 1945 Raid on Yontan:
- Destroyed
  - (3) F4U Corsairs
  - (2) PB4Y-2 Privateers
  - (4) R5C cargo planes.
- Damaged
  - (22) F4U Corsairs
  - (3) F6F Hellcats
  - (2) B-24 Liberators
  - (2) R5C cargo planes

Just after 8pm on May 24, Japanese bombers began to strike targets at both Ie Shima and Yontan Airfields. At 2225 the first of the remaining Giretsu Sally bomber approached Yontan Airfield at very low level and was successfully engaged by Marine anti-aircraft gunners of the 1st Provisional Antiaircraft Artillery Group who were tasked with defending the field. Five minutes later, three more Japanese aircraft appeared at low-level over Yontan and were observed attempting to land before being shot down or crash landing. A small number of Giretsu survived this wave and began their mission of attacking aircraft on the airfield. A fourth aircraft was shot down south of the airfield and its severed wing fell and hit an anti-aircraft position killing two Marines from the 16th Antiaircraft Artillery Battalion. A fifth aircraft successfully evaded anti-aircraft fire and was able to belly land approximately 100 meters from the control tower. Immediately upon landing, approximately 10-12 commandos were able to disembark and begin their assigned mission of destroying aircraft on the airfield. The attackers flung grenades and attached incendiary devices to aircraft as chaos initially reigned amongst large numbers of aircraft maintenance and airfield services personnel in the vicinity.

Among the first to engage the Japanese attackers was 1st Lt Maynard Kelly who was working in the Yontan air traffic control tower that evening. Eventually, led by 1st Lt Clark C. Campbell and Technical Sergeant Chandler M. Beasley from VMF(N)-542, the Marines on the field were able to organize a disciplined resistance and begin to engage the remaining Japanese commandos. Fighting continued throughout the night into the early morning. The last of the Japanese attackers was killed at 1255 on May 25 about a quarter of a mile behind Marine Aircraft Group 31's headquarters building. After the raid, two Marines from the 8th Antiaircraft Artillery Battalion discovered a Japanese officer sleeping in the jungle near the airfield and shot him in the head for which they were court-martialed. One member of the raiding party survived and was able to make his way across the battlefield, reaching the Thirty-Second Army Headquarters (Okinawa) around June 12.

During the raid, Lieutenant Colonel Marion Magruder, commanding officer of VMF(N)-533, was returning to the airfield leading a division of Grumman F6F Hellcats after conducting a combat air patrol. Magruder and his pilots landed on the field in the middle of the fighting. They skillfully avoided both friendly antiaircraft fire and small arms fire on the ground. The pilots then moved from foxhole to foxhole during the engagement looking after and encouraging Marines in the fight.

=== Casualties ===
Marines wounded in action during the Raid on Yontan:

- 2d Marine Aircraft Wing (Incomplete list - still missing 1 name)
  - Sgt Albert C. Abbott - SMS-31, MAG-31
  - SSgt Coln Dayle Ainslie - HqSq-31, MAG-31
  - Cpl Jack B. Boorstein - HqSq-31, MAG-31
  - 2ndLt Byron F. Brady Jr - SMS-31, MAG-31
  - PFC Joe H. DeFravio - SMS-31, MAG-31
  - Cpl Gerald B. Gardner - HqSq-31, MAG-31
  - Cpl David F. Gustafson - VMF-322, MAG-33
  - 1stLt Albert B. Hall - HqSq-31, MAG-31
  - Cpl John F. Kelly - VMF(N)-542, MAG-31
  - Sgt Benjamin J. Masciale - VMF(N)-542, MAG-31
  - Cpl Robert E. Mayhew - HqSq-31, MAG-31
  - SSgt Daniel T. McCarthy - SMS-31, MAG-31
  - PFC Vincent R. Polidoro - VMF(N)-542
  - PFC Bob L. Scaggs - SMS-31, MAG-31
  - Pvt Louis G. Schooley - HqSq-31, MAG-31
  - TSgt Garland M. Stanley - VMF(N)-542, MAG-31
  - Cpl Joseph C. Thompson - SMS-31, MAG-31
- 1st Provisional Antiaircraft Artillery Group
  - 1stLt Warren P. Crudgington - 8th AAA Battalion
  - PltSgt Earl K. De Rosia - 16th AAA Battalion
  - TSgt Willard D. Gainer - 8th AAA Battalion
  - Pvt D. F. Grimes - 16th AAA Battalion
  - PFC William J. Ingelsby - 8th AAA Battalion
  - PltSgt Thomas F. Lynch - 16th AAA Battalion
  - Sgt Willard Franklin Mason - 16th AAA Battalion
  - PFC Allen O. Richter - 8th AAA Battalion
  - Cpl Paul N. Sackelson - 16th AAA Battalion

In total, 69 Japanese bodies were recovered and buried on the airfield after the raid and no prisoners were taken. During the night, American anti-aircraft crews on Ie Shima and near Yontan Field recorded 27 aircraft destroyed, 2 aircraft probably destroyed, and 10 aircraft damaged.

For the United States, four Marines were killed with another twenty-seven wounded. From the 2nd Marine Aircraft Wing, two Marines were killed and eighteen wounded 1st Lt Maynard C. Kelley and Technical Sgt Roderick J. Wogan were killed by small arms fire during the raid. The 1st Provisional Antiaircraft Artillery Group had another two Marines killed with nine wounded in action. Corporal Lavate L. Aumiller and Private Nathaniel C. Collinsworth from the 16th AAA Battalion's searchlight battery were killed when a falling Japanese aircraft wing hit their position.

1st Lt Maynard C. Kelley was a pilot assigned to VMF(N)-533 serving in the control tower on Yontan Airfield on the evening of May 24. After witnessing the Japanese planes landing, Lt Kelley drove his jeep to the area and began engaging the enemy with his service revolver. He killed one of the attackers before withdrawing back to the control tower. From this exposed position in the tower he used his signal lamp to assist other Marines in identifying and engaging additional attackers on the field. Lt Kelley was killed by enemy small arms fire in the control tower. For his actions in defense of the airfield 1stLt Kelley was posthumously awarded the Navy Cross.

== Aftermath ==
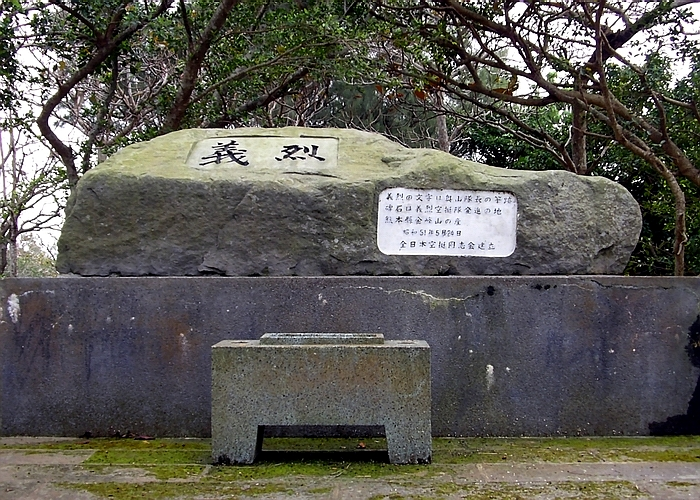
Memorial to Giretsu Commandos in Itoman, Okinawa

Operation Kikusui VII, another large kamikaze raid which ran in conjunction with the raid on Yontan, took place between May 23–25. It consisted of 387 Navy planes and 174 Army planes (of which 107 Navy planes and 61 Army planes were kamikazes). The achievements of this raid were quite small compared to the previous operations, with only one transport sunk and one escort aircraft carrier damaged.

For his actions during the attack, 1st Lt Maynard C. Kelley was posthumously awarded the Navy Cross. Technical Sergeant Jerome Reubel from VMF(N)-542 also received the Bronze Star for his actions that evening. He skillfully directed fire on enemy positions and was able to kill one of the attackers while saving others in his unit from serious injury.

The Japanese considered the Yontan Raid a success so a second large-scale "giretsu" attack was planned with the objective being American bases in the Marianas. The specific intent of this follow on raid was to destroy B-29 Superfortress bombers that were bombing the Japanese mainland. This second raid was to be much larger than the first with 60 transports and 900 commandos planned for the nights of 19–23 August 1945 (Operation Ken-gou). On August 15, Japan surrendered and the operation was canceled.

== See also ==
- Kamikaze
- List of Imperial Japanese Army air-to-surface special attack units
- September 2012 raid on Camp Bastion
