= Battle of Tarawa order of battle =

Order of battle for World War II battle

Tarawa Atoll

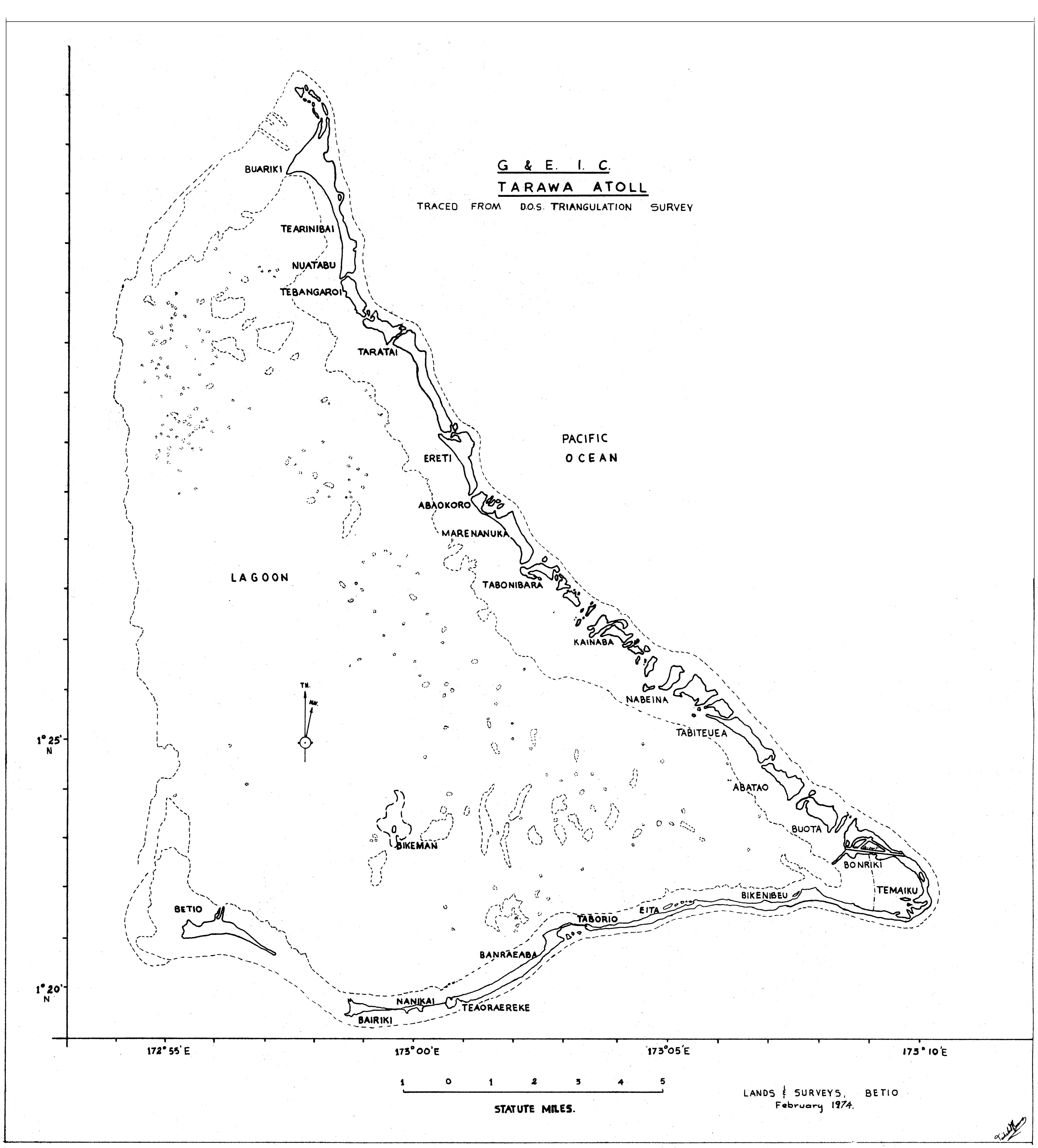
Betio Island is at lower left

On 10 November 1943, men of the United States Marine Corps invaded the island of Betio, located at the southwest corner of Tarawa Atoll in the Gilbert Islands chain in the Central Pacific. This invasion, known as Operation Galvanic, was a phase of the Pacific Theatre of World War II.

The landings on Betio were the Americans' third amphibious operation of the Pacific War, after Guadalcanal Island and Cape Torokina on Bougainville Island, but the first in which the Japanese vigorously resisted the landings on the beaches, pinning the Marines down with machine-gun and mortar fire. Worse, American planners at Pearl Harbor had grievously misjudged the timing of high tide at Betio, leaving the landing craft stranded on the shallow coral reefs where the Marines were slaughtered.

The island was declared secure after three days. Given the small size of Betio (0.59 sq. mi.), planners had expected it to take one.

== Command structure ==
Naval commanders for Operation Galvanic

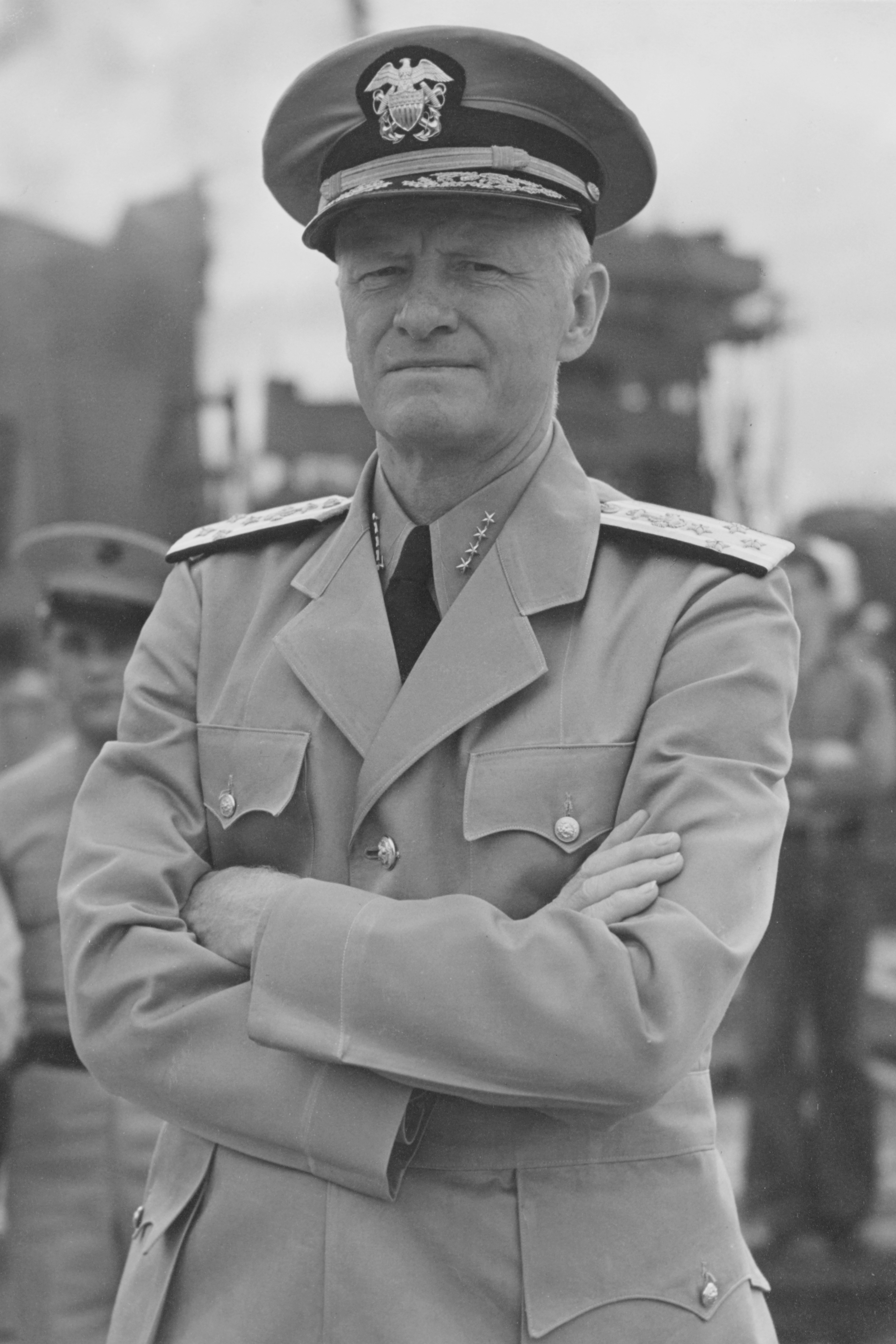
Adm. Chester W. Nimitz

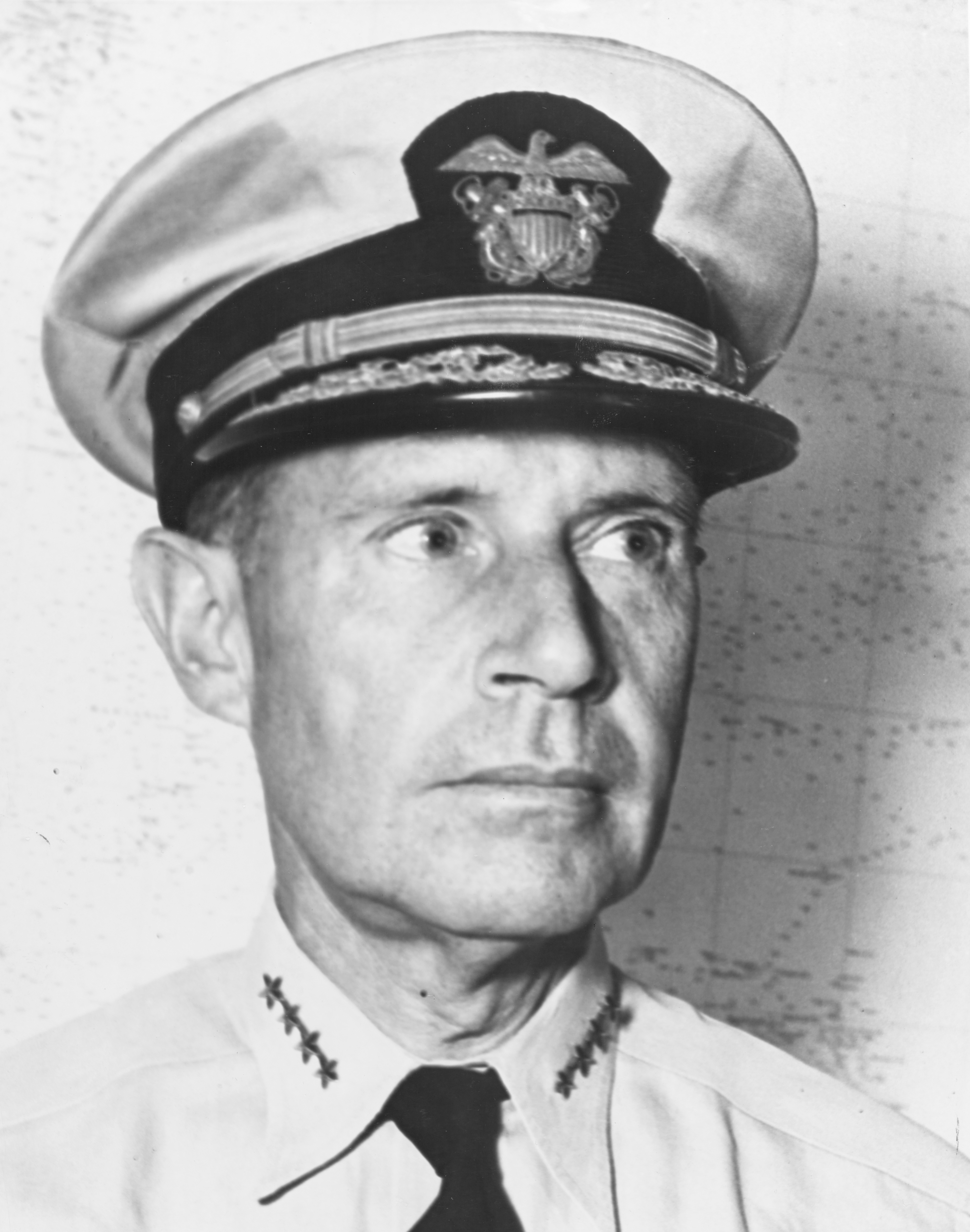
Vice Adm. Raymond A. Spruance

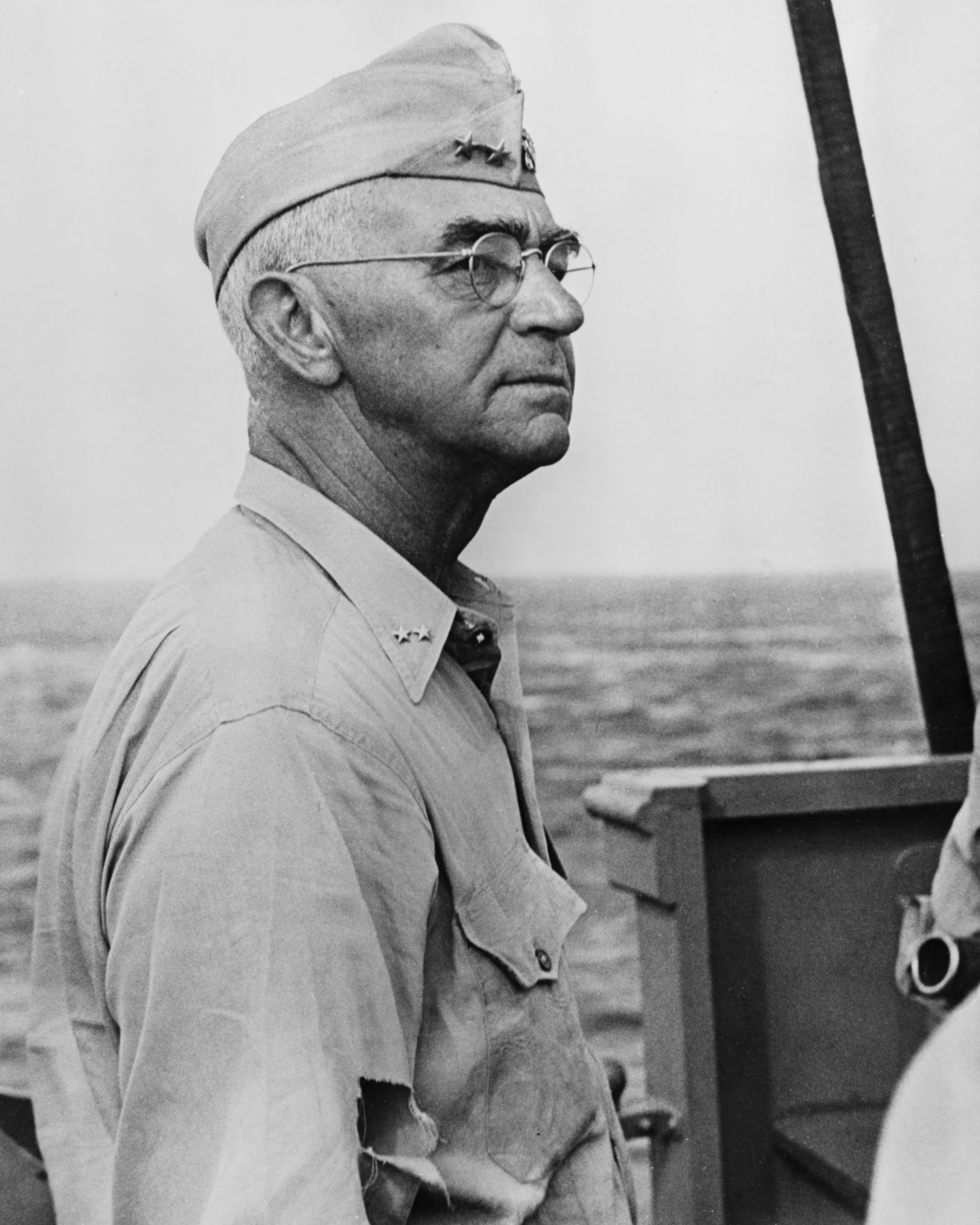
Rear Adm. Richmond Kelly Turner

Ground force commanders

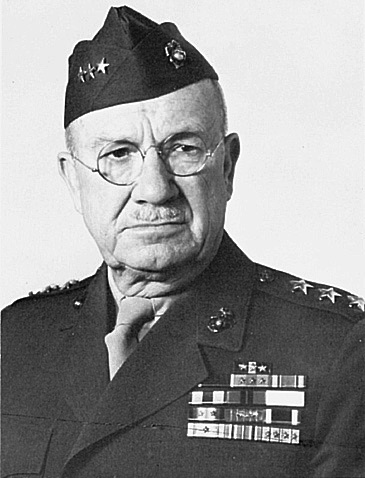
Maj. Gen. Holland M. Smith, USMC

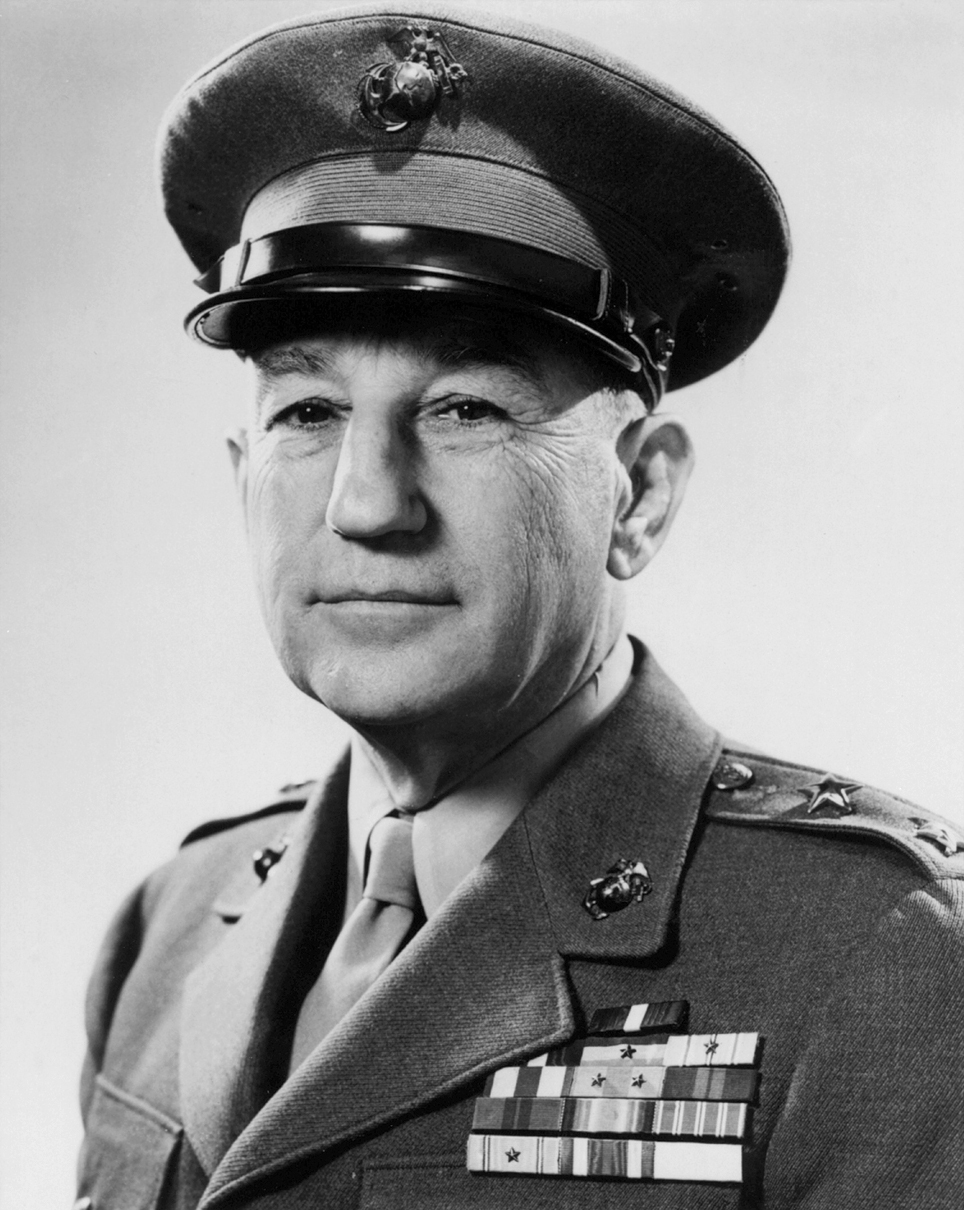
Maj. Gen. Julian C. Smith, USMC

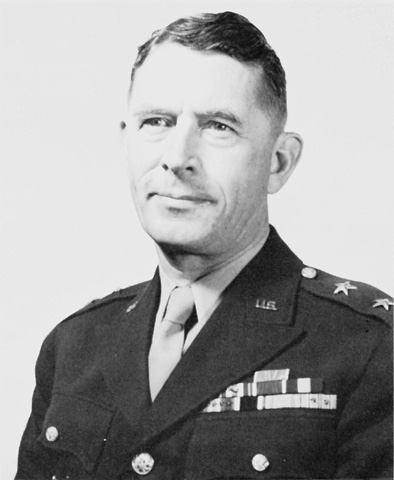
Maj. Gen. Ralph C. Smith, USA

=== Naval ===
The roles of Commander in Chief, Pacific Ocean Areas (CINCPOA) and Commander in Chief, U.S. Pacific Fleet (CINCPAC), were both exercised by Admiral Chester W. Nimitz from his headquarters at Pearl Harbor, Hawaii.

Since the Gilberts and Marshalls lie in the Central Pacific, their capture was the responsibility of the U.S. Fifth Fleet, led by Vice Admiral Raymond A. Spruance from aboard his flagship, heavy cruiser Indianapolis.

The ships and troops of Operations Galvanic (landings on Tarawa Atoll) and Kourbash (landings on Makin Atoll) were under direct operational command of Rear Admiral Richmond Kelly Turner aboard old battleship Pennsylvania.

=== Ground troops ===
V Amphibious Corps
Major General Holland M. "Howlin' Mad" Smith (Note: Generated so much ill-will between the services that he was eventually reassigned stateside.)

Tarawa: 2nd Marine Division (Major General Julian C. Smith)
Makin: 27th Infantry Division (Army) (Major General Ralph C. Smith)

Both Admiral Turner and General Holland Smith sailed with the Northern Attack Force even though it was obvious that Tarawa would be the scene of the main ground action. If the Japanese mounted a counterattack, it was most likely to come from the Marshalls since the closest Japanese bases to the Gilberts were located there. Nimitz and Spruance wanted the two highest-ranking officers to sail with the forces that would be the first to encounter any such enemy response. Unbeknownst to the Americans, the Japanese had stripped almost all their naval and air assets from the Marshalls in an attempt to resist the Allied effort in the Central Solomons. Thus, no counterattack materialized.

== American ==
2nd Marine Division command at Tarawa

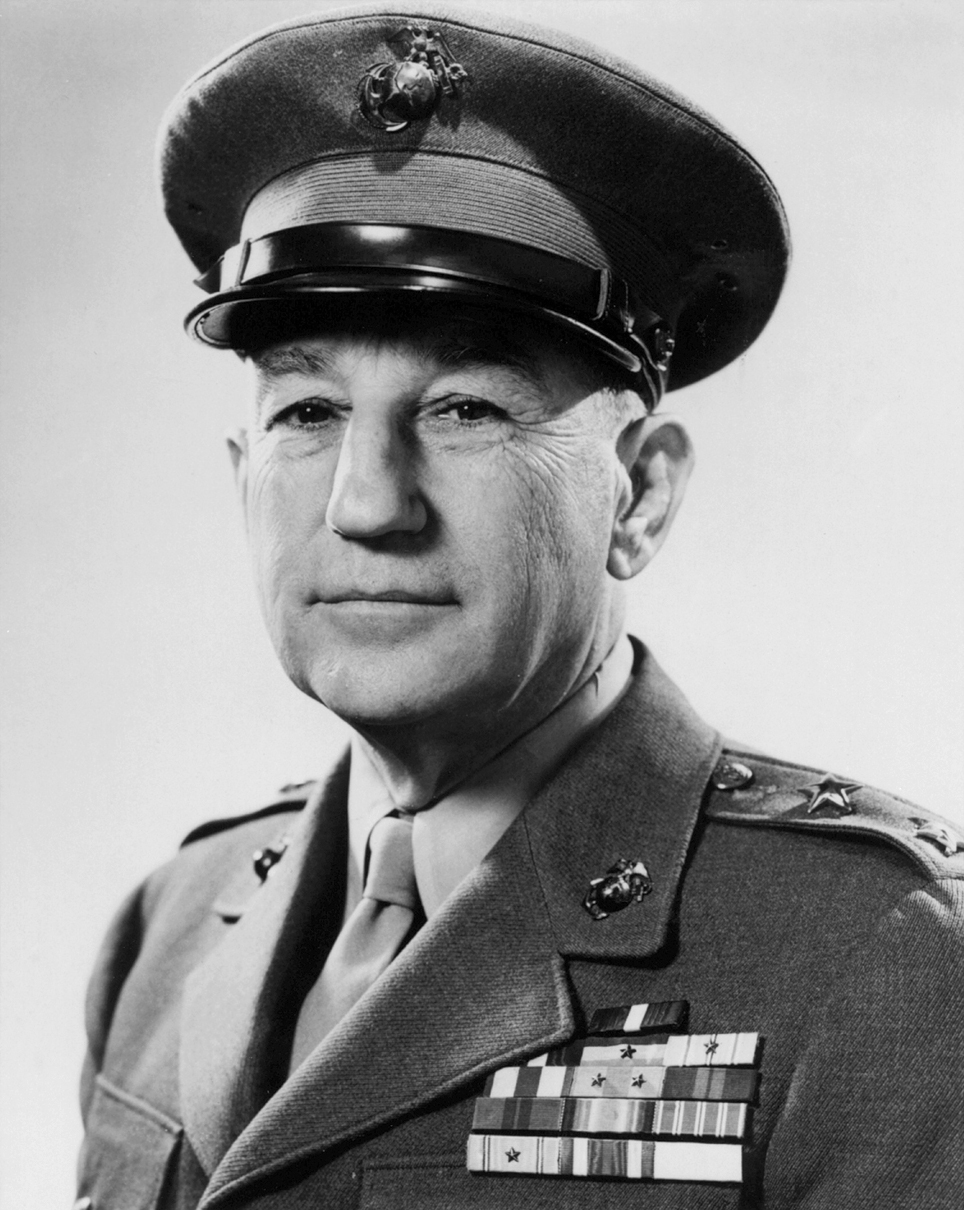
Maj. Gen. Julian C. Smith

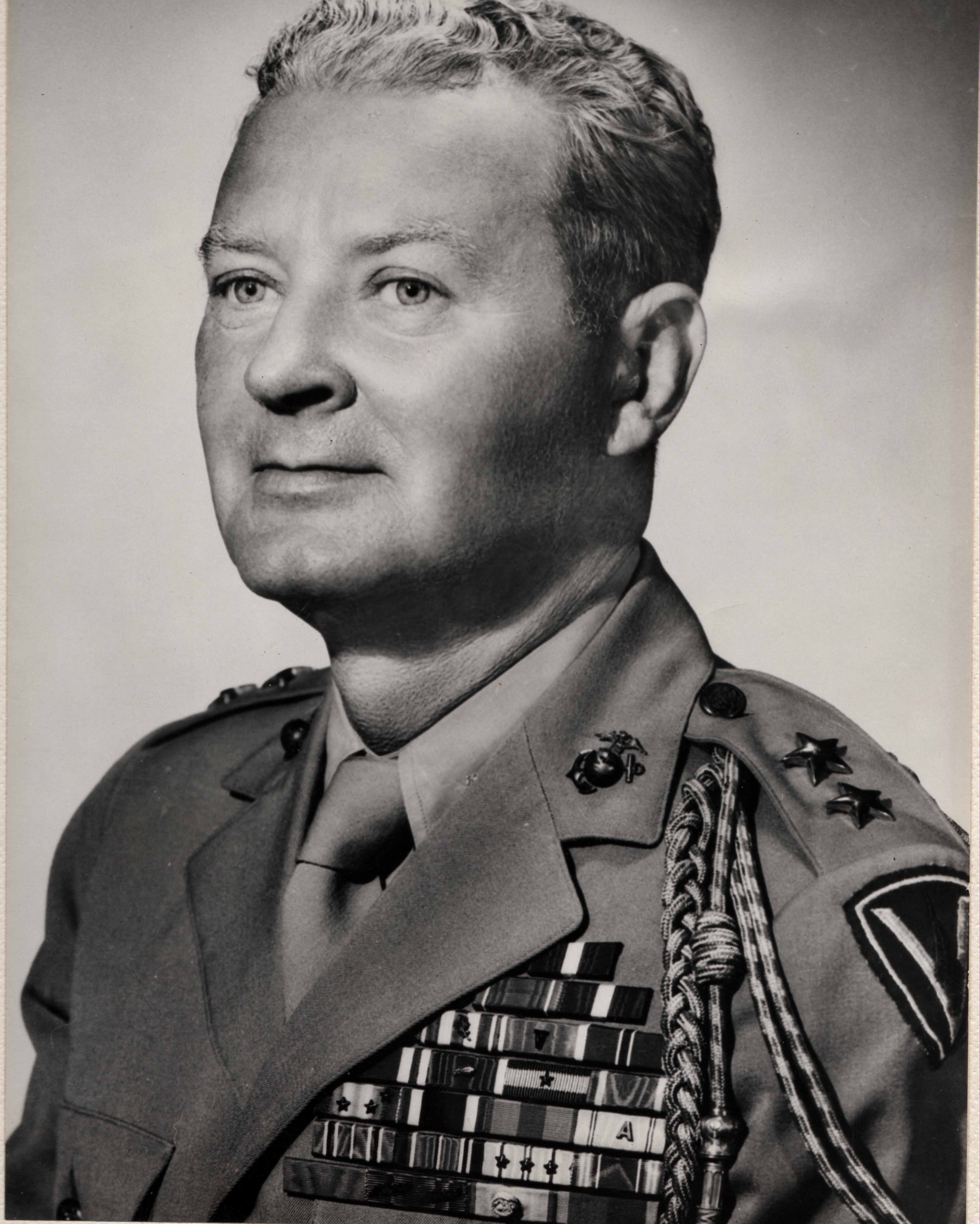
Leo D. Hermle as a major general

=== Ground forces – Tarawa ===
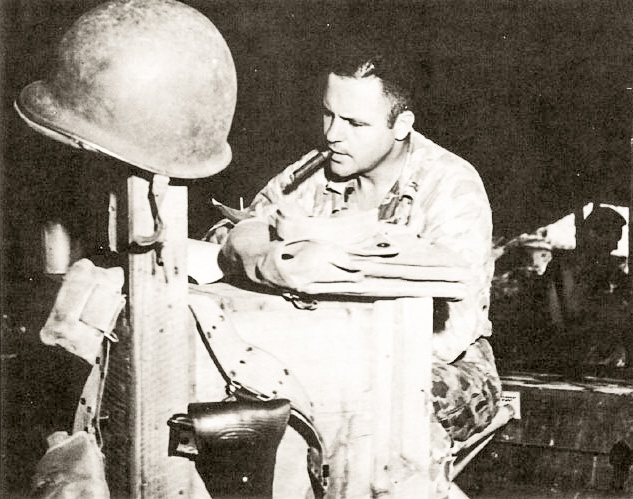
Col. David M. Shoup on Betio Island; he was awarded the Congressional Medal of Honor for his extraordinary leadership during the chaos of the initial assault.

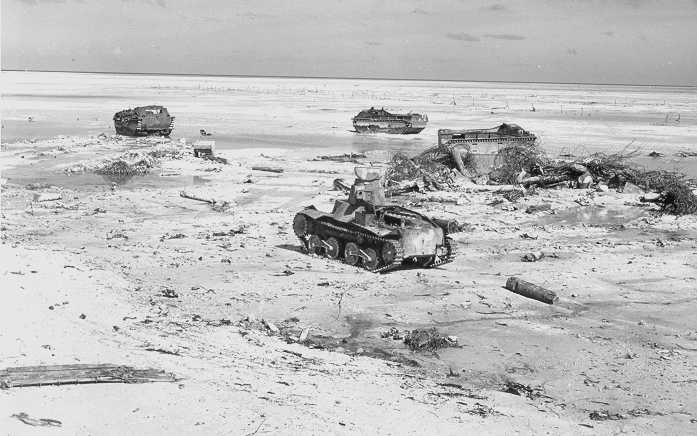
A Japanese Type 95 Ha-Go tank at Tarawa after the battle. Three disabled U.S. Marine Corps LVT-1s are visible in the background.

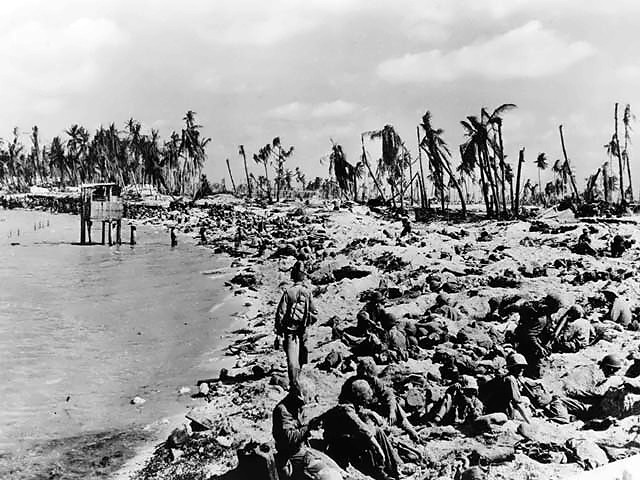
The devastated beach on Betio after the island was secured.

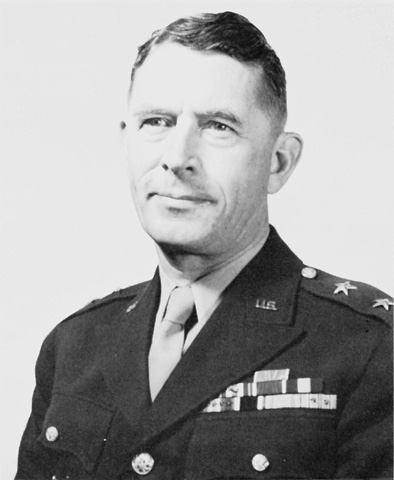
Maj. Gen. Ralph C. Smith, USA

2nd Marine Division
Major General Julian C. Smith

Asst. Div. Cmdr.: Brig. Gen. Leo D. Hermle
Chief of Staff: Col. Merritt A. Edson
Personnel officer (G-1): Lt. Col. C.P. van Ness
Intelligence officer (G-2): Lt. Col. Thomas J. Colley
Operations officer (G-3): Lt. Col. James P. Riseley
Logistics officer (G-4): Lt. Col Jesse S. Cook

Eastern landing area:

8th Marine Regiment
Colonel Elmer E. Hall
Exec. Ofc.: Lt. Col. Paul D. Sherman

First Wave (Red Beach 3): 2nd Battalion (Maj. Henry P. Crowe)

CMoH recipient: Lt. Alexander Bonnyman Jr. ( † Nov 23)

Second Wave (Red Beach 3): 3rd Battalion (Maj. Robert H. Ruud)
Third Wave (Red Beach 2): 1st Battalion (Maj. Lawrence C. Hays Jr.)

Central landing area:

2nd Marine Regiment
Colonel David M. Shoup (CMoH recipient) (Note: Also commander of landed troops; awarded the Congressional Medal of Honor for his extraordinary leadership during the chaos of the initial assault.)
Exec. Ofc.: Lt. Col. Dixon Goen

First Wave (Red Beach 1): 3rd Battalion (Maj. John F. Schoettel)
First Wave (Red Beach 2): 2nd Battalion (Lt. Col. Herbert R. Amey, Jr. ( † Nov 20), then Lt. Col. Walter I. Jordan)

CMoH recipient: Lt. William D. Hawkins ( † Nov 23)

Second Wave (Red Beach 2): 1st Battalion (Major Wood B. Kyle)

Western landing area:

6th Marine Regiment
Colonel Maurice G. Holmes
Exec. Ofc.: Lt. Col. Russell Lloyd

Third Wave (Green Beach): 1st Battalion (Maj. William K. Jones)
21–24 Nov (Outer Islands of Tarawa): 2nd Battalion (Lt. Col. Raymond L. Murray)
Fourth Wave (Green Beach): 3rd Battalion (Lt. Col. Kenneth F. McLeod)

10th Marine Regiment (Artillery)
Colonel Thomas E. Bourke
Exec. Ofc.: Lt. Col. Ralph E. Forsyth

1st Battalion (Lt. Col. Presley M. Rixey)
2nd Battalion (Lt. Col. George R. E. Shell)
3rd Battalion (Lt. Col. Manly L. Curry)
4th Battalion (Lt. Col. Kenneth A. Jorgensen)
5th Battalion (Maj. Howard V. Hiett)

18th Marine Regiment (Engineer)
Colonel Cyril W. Martyr
Exec. Ofc.: Lt. Col. Ewart S. Laue

1st Battalion (Engineers) (Maj. George L.H. Cooper)

CMoH recipient: Sgt. William J. Bordelon ( † Nov 21)

2nd Battalion (Pioneers) (Lt. Col. Chester J. Salazar)
3rd Battalion (Seabees) (Cmdr. Lawrence E. Tull, USN)

Other units

2nd Defense Battalion (Note: Pvt. Edward D. Wood, later a producer of low-budget movies such as Plan 9 from Outer Space, served in this unit on Betio.)
2nd Amphibian Tractor Battalion (Maj. Henry C. Drewes ( † Nov 20))
2nd Tank Battalion (Lt. Col. Alexander B. Swenceski) (M3A1 Stuart)
Co.C, Tank Battalion, I Marine Amphibious Corps (M4A2 Sherman) (Note: Attached to 2nd Tank Battalion)

=== Ground forces – Makin ===
27th Infantry Division (Army)
Major General Ralph C. Smith

165th Regimental Combat Team
3rd Battalion / 105th Infantry Regiment ("Appleknockers")

Attached units

193rd Tank Battalion (light)
2nd Raider Battalion Colonel Evans Carlson

== Japanese ==
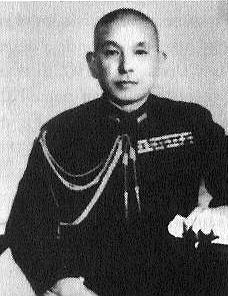
Rear Adm. Keiji Shibazaki

Gilbert Islands defense forces
Rear Admiral Keiji Shibazaki ( † Nov 20)
Approx. 5,000 total men under arms

3rd Special Base Force (Note: Formerly 6th Yokosuka SNLF)
7th Sasebo SNLF
111th Construction Unit
4th Fleet Construction Dept. (detachment)

== See also ==
Orders of battle involving United States Marine forces in the Pacific Theatre of World War II:

- Battle of Guadalcanal order of battle
- Battle of Saipan order of battle
- Guam (1944) order of battle
- Battle of Leyte opposing forces
- Battle of Peleliu opposing forces
- Battle of Iwo Jima order of battle
- Okinawa ground order of battle
  - Naval Base Tarawa

== Sources ==
- Clark, George B. (2006). The Six Marine Divisions in the Pacific: Every Campaign of World War II. Jefferson, North Carolina: McFarland and Co. ISBN 978-0-7864-2769-7.
- Morison, Samuel Eliot (1951). Aleutians, Gilberts and Marshalls: June 1942 April 1944. History of United States Naval Operations in World War II. Vol. VII. Boston: Little, Brown and Co. ISBN 978-0-31658-307-7.
