= Jerauld =

Jerauld may refer to:

== People ==
- Jerauld R. Gentry (1935–2003), American Air Force test pilot
- Dutee Jerauld Pearce (1789–1849), American politician
- Jerauld Wright (1898–1995), American Naval officer

== Other uses ==
- Jerauld County, South Dakota, U.S.
- Charlotte Ann Fillebrown Jerauld (1820-1845), American poet, story writer
- USS Jerauld (APA-174), American naval ship
