= VMA-543 =

Marine Attack Squadron 543
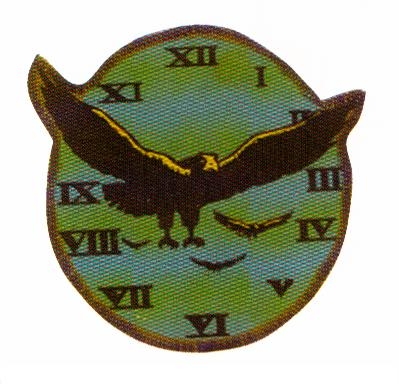
- VMA-543’s insignia
- Active: 15 April 1944 - 11 April 1946 unknown - 1 April 1974
- Country: United States
- Branch: USMC
- Type: Attack Squadron
- Role: Close air support Air interdiction
- Part of: Inactive
- Nickname(s): Night Hawks
- Tail Code: VK
- Engagements: World War II * Battle of Okinawa

Aircraft flown
- Attack: A4L Skyhawk
- Fighter: F6F-3N Hellcat; F9F Cougar
- Trainer: T-34B Mentor

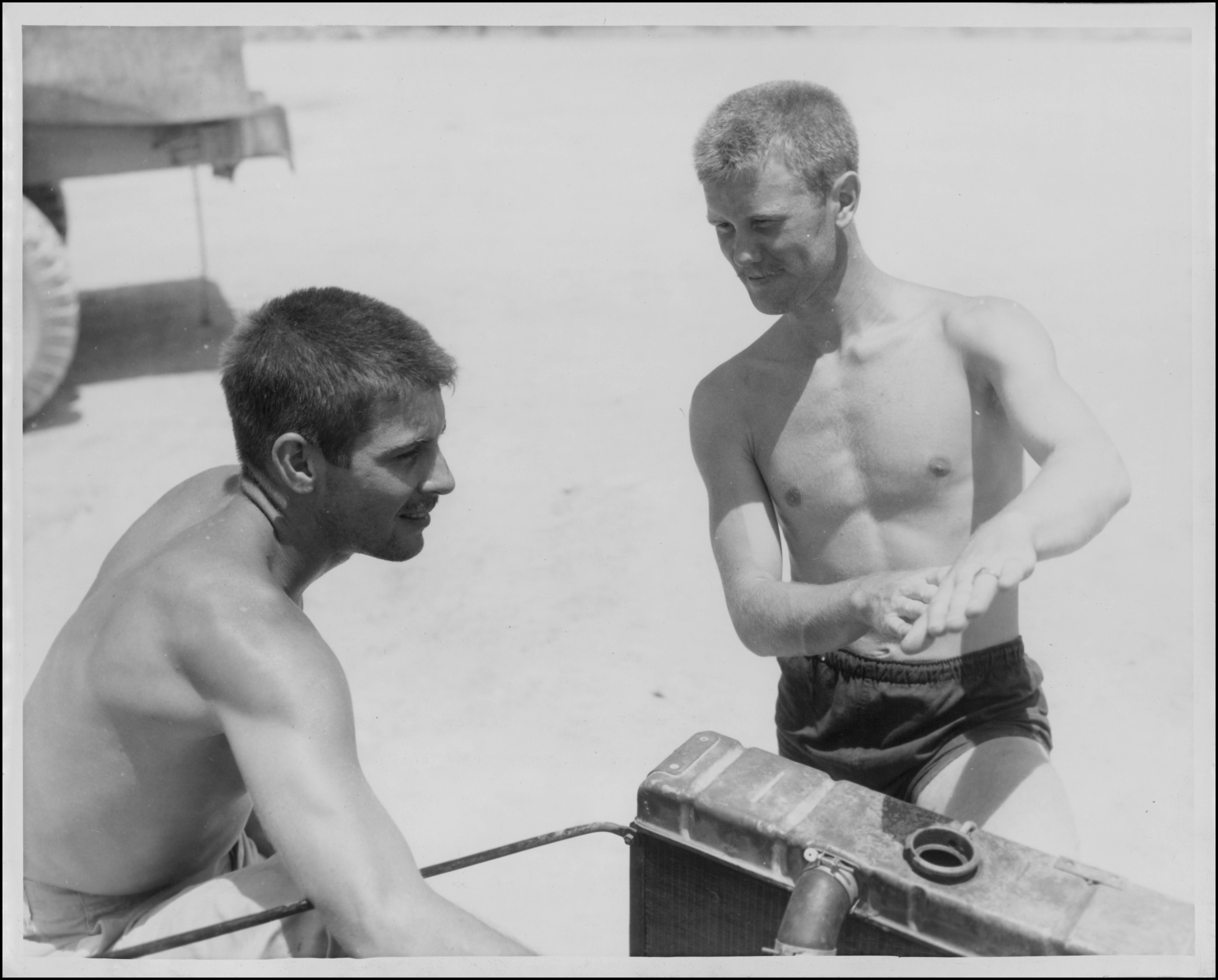
Two pilots with the Night Hawks squadron

Marine Attack Squadron 543 (VMA-543) was an aviation unit of the United States Marine Corps. The squadron, also known as the "Night Hawks", were part of the Marine Forces Reserve and were based at Naval Air Station Glenview, Illinois until their deactivation on 1 April 1974. Originally activated during World War II, they fought in the Battle of Okinawa as part of the Tactical Air Force. The squadron was credited with downing 15 Japanese aircraft during the war. Following the surrender of Japan, the squadron was deactivated only to be later reactivated as part of the Reserves. They were again deactivated in 1974 and remain in an inactive status today.

== History ==
=== World War II ===
VMF(N)-543 was commissioned on 15 April 1944 at Marine Corps Air Station Cherry Point, North Carolina. On 2 July 1943 the squadron commanding officer, Major Claude Carlson, was killed when he developed hypoxia at high altitude in his F6F Hellcat due to a defective regulator. The Night Hawks continued to train there through the summer until the squadron moved to Marine Corps Air Station El Centro, California on 30 September 1944. More training ensued until it departed for Marine Corps Air Station Ewa, Hawaii in January 1945. From MCAS Ewa the squadron was separated into three echelons. The assault echelon departed Hawaii on 22 February on board the USS Achernar (AKA-53) and USS Meriwether (APA-203). They steamed westward via Eniwetok, Ulithi, Palau, and Leyte, landing on Okinawa early 7 April. The flight echelon arrived on Okinawa 9 April and the rear echelon caught up with the squadron on 1 May 1945.

The squadron took its first casualties when 5 squadron Marines were injured when their transport ship USS Achernar was hit by a kamikaze. Twenty members of the squadron received commendations for their actions to help put out the fire on board the ship that ensued. During the Battle of Okinawa the squadron was attached to Marine Aircraft Group 33 (MAG-33) and flew from Kadena Airfield They began flying tactical mission on 9 April and continued through 7 August. At first the Marine night fighters were not that effective against the nightly Japanese bombing raids. The network of Air Warning Squadrons, which would provide ground-controlled intercept around the island, was still being emplaced, there were many issues with sensitive electronics gear, radio interference was rampant and even friendly anti-aircraft fire was a problem. By mid-May though, the problems had been worked through, and for the remainder of the campaign night fighters were extremely effective against the enemy. During the battle the squadron was also tasked with flying night heckling missions which consisted of strafing enemy positions though these missions effects were limited at best. During their time on Okinawa the Night Hawks were credited with shooting down 15 Japanese aircraft and 1 probable. Following the Battle of Okinawa the squadron moved to Awase Airfield where they would remain until the surrender of Japan.

VMF(N)-543 would return to the states in January 1946 and be based at Marine Corps Air Station Miramar, California. On 11 April 1946, as part of the post-war drawdown of forces, the squadron was decommissioned.

=== Reserve years ===
After the war the squadron was reactivated as Marine Fighting Squadron 543 (VMF-543), a standard day fighter squadron at Naval Air Station Glenview, Illinois. The squadron was later designated Marine Attack Squadron 543 (VMA-543) but was deactivated on 1 April 1974 as part of the post-Vietnam War reduction in forces.

== Unit awards ==
A unit citation or commendation is an award bestowed upon an organization for the action cited. Members of the unit who participated in said actions are allowed to wear on their uniforms the awarded unit citation. VMA-543 was presented with the following awards:

Streamer	Award	Year(s)	Additional Info
	Presidential Unit Citation Streamer	9 April - 14 July 1945	Okinawa
	Asiatic-Pacific Campaign Streamer		
	World War II Victory Streamer	1941–1945	Pacific War

== See also ==
- United States Marine Corps Aviation
- List of active United States Marine Corps aircraft squadrons
- List of decommissioned United States Marine Corps aircraft squadrons
