= 8th Antiaircraft Artillery Battalion =

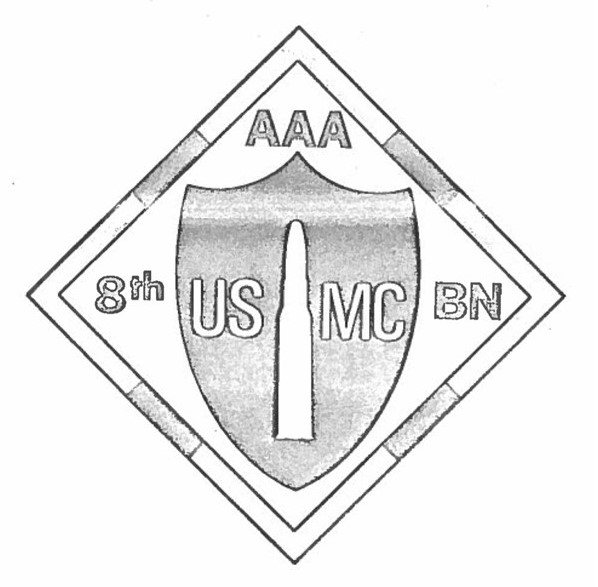
- Unofficial insignia taken from a 1981 8th AAA Battalion reunion pamphlet
- Active: 1 Apr 1942 – 27 Nov 1945
- Country: United States of America
- Branch: United States Marine Corps
- Type: Air Defense/Coastal Defense
- Size: ~800 men
- Part of: V Amphibious Corps
- Engagements: World War II; *Gilbert Islands Campaign; *Battle of Okinawa

Commanders
- Current commander: N/A

The 8th Antiaircraft Artillery Battalion (8th AAA Bn) was a United States Marine Corps antiaircraft unit that served during World War II. Formed in 1942 as the 8th Defense Battalion, its original mission was the air and coastal defense of advanced naval bases. During the war the battalion defended Tutuila in American Samoa, Wallis Island and Apamama and took part in combat operations at Okinawa. The battalion returned to the United States after the war and was decommissioned on 28 November 1945.

== History ==
The 8th Defense Battalion was commissioned on 1 April 1942 at Tutuila, American Samoa. On 27 May 1942 elements of the battalion began sailing for Wallis Island. The entire battalion completed movement to Wallis by 4 June. The 8th Defense Battalion (Reinforced) became the headquarters for the Defense Force, Wallis Island which had under it 3rd Battalion, 7th Marines, C Battery, 1st Battalion, 11th Marines, and additional engineer, transport, and medical detachments.

On 25 October 1942, the battalion was attached to the V Amphibious Corps for duty with the 2nd Marine Division in the Gilbert and Marshall Islands campaign. The battalion landed at Apamama, Gilbert Islands on 28 November 1943. They provided air defense for the area until 21 March 1944 when it embarked and departed for Territory of Hawaii. The battalion arrived in Hawaii by 3 April and established camp on Kauai.

As the war progressed, the Marine Corps removed coastal artillery from the defense battalions in order to form additional heavy artillery units for the Fleet Marine Force. Because of the divestiture of the coastal defense mission, the battalion was re-designated as the 8th Antiaircraft Artillery Battalion on 15 June 1944. For the next few months, the battalion continued to train on Kauai.

On 10 March 1945, most of the 8th Antiaircraft Artillery Battalion departed Kauai on board the USS Lenoir (AKA-74) and the USS Jerauld (APA-174). The convoy passed through Eniwetok and Ulithi en route to Okinawa, Japan. The battalion began disembarking naval shipping on 17 April 1945. During the Battle of Okinawa the 8th AAA Battalion was one of four AAA battalions that comprised the 1st Provisional Antiaircraft Artillery Group during the Battle of Okinawa. During the battle they were emplaced near Yontan Airfield in order to protect the airfield against Japanese air raids and kamikaze attacks. One marine from the battalion was killed in action during the battle and another ten were wounded in action. The battalion remained on Okinawa providing air defense until 20 September 1945.

On 22 October the 8th AAA Battalion embarked upon the USS Meriwether (APA-203) and sailed for the United States. The battalion arrived at San Diego, California on 8 November 1945. On 27 November 1945 the 8th Antiaircraft Artillery Battalion was decommissioned.

== Unit awards ==
A unit citation or commendation is an award bestowed upon an organization for the action cited. Members of the unit who participated in said actions are allowed to wear on their uniforms the awarded unit citation. The 8th Antiaircraft Artillery Battalion has been presented with the following awards:

Streamer	Award	Year(s)	Additional Info
	Presidential Unit Citation Streamer	17 April - 14 July 1945	Okinawa
	Asiatic-Pacific Campaign Streamer with one Bronze Star		Gilbert Islands, Okinawa
	World War II Victory Streamer	1941–1945	Pacific War

== See also ==
- Marine Defense Battalions
- List of United States Marine Corps aviation support units
