= Giretsu Kuteitai =

May 1945 Japanese commando raid on Allied held Okinawa airfields

Giretsu (義烈空挺隊, Giretsu Kūteitai)
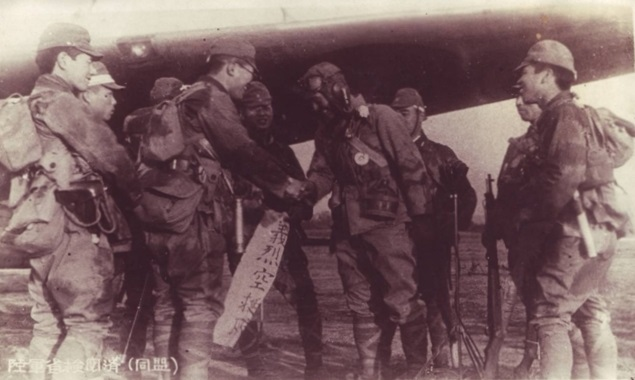
- Captain Okuyama and Giretsu Airborne unit depart on their mission to Okinawa
- Country: Imperial Japan
- Branch: Imperial Japanese Army
- Type: Commando
- Role: Assault and airfield seizure Close-quarters combat Demolition; Parachuting; Raiding; Reconnaissance; Special operations
- Engagements: Pacific War: Battle of Okinawa

Commanders
- Notable commanders: Lieutenant General Michio Sugahara

Giretsu Kuteitai (義烈空挺隊, Giretsu Kūteitai; "Heroic Paratroopers") was an airborne commando unit of the Imperial Japanese Army formed from Teishin Shudan (IJA airborne forces), in November 1944 as a last-ditch attempt to reduce and delay Allied bombing raids on the Japanese home islands. The Giretsu commando unit was commanded by Lieutenant General Michio Sugahara.

== History ==
After USAAF B-29 Superfortress strategic bombers began attacks on Tokyo from bases in the Mariana Islands, the 1st Raiding Brigade of the Teishin Shudan was ordered to form a commando unit for a "special operations" mission to attack and destroy the bombers on the Aslito Airfield on Saipan. Captain Michiro Okuyama, commander of the brigade's engineering company, was selected as mission leader, and he selected an additional 126 men from his own team (1st Teishin-Dan 1st Regiment 4th Company) to form the first Giretsu Airborne Unit. It was initially organized with a command section and five platoons and one independent squad, based at the IJA air academy at Saitama. The group unit also included eight intelligence officers and two radio men from the Nakano School.

== Tactics ==
The Giretsu operations were to be undertaken at night, beginning with air strikes by bombers. After this, commando units would be inserted onto the target airfield by crash landing their transports. The fact that there was no provision for extraction of the strike force, along with the rejection of surrender in Japanese military doctrine at the time, meant that the Giretsu ground operations were effectively suicide attacks.

== Operations ==
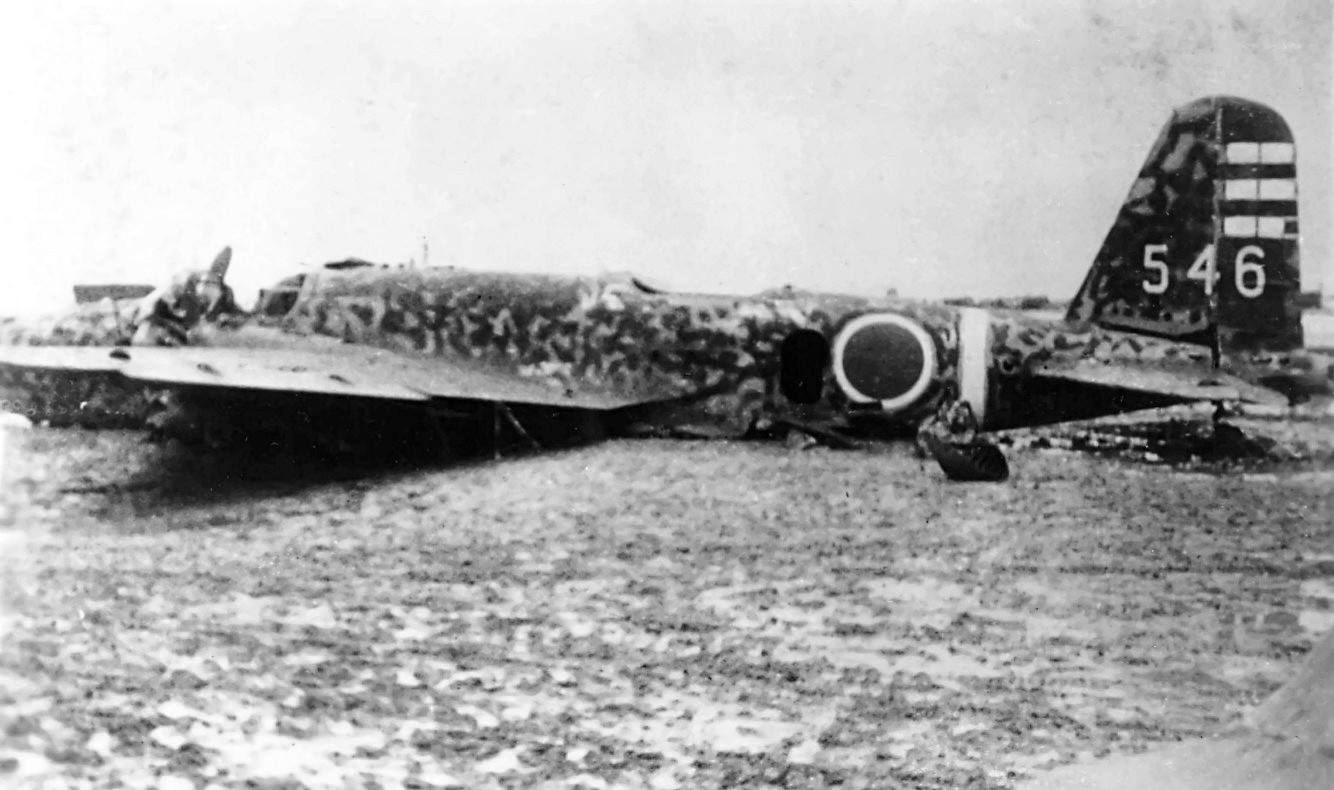
Ki-21-IIb of the Daisan Dokuritsu Hikōtai at Yontan Airfield, 25 May 1945

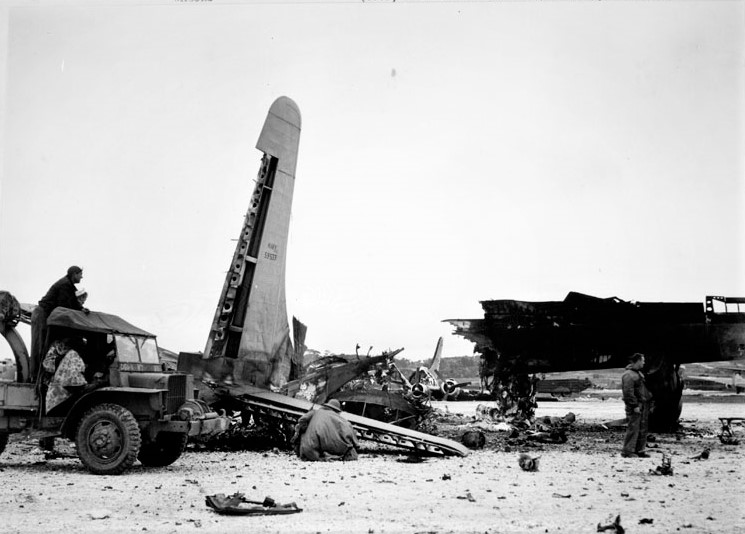
Wrecked U.S. planes after attack on Yontan Airfield

The attack against the Marianas was scheduled for 24 December 1944, but was called off after American raids damaged the planned refueling airfields on Iwo Jima. After the Marianas raid was cancelled plans were made to attack airfields on Iwo Jima captured by the United States Marine Corps in March, but these too were cancelled when the Iwo Jima garrison fell.

On 1 April, US forces landed on Okinawa, and American fighters based on Okinawa's west coast intercepted and shot down many kamikaze aircraft attacking the American fleet. In the middle of April, the Sixth Air Army requested the deployment of the Giretsu Special Forces to neutralize these airfields, in what was designated "Operation Gi-gou". On 18 May, this was authorized.

On the night of 24 May 1945, twelve Ki-21-IIbs of the Daisan Dokuritsu Hikōtai ("3rd Independent Squadron": 32 crew members commanded by Captain Chuichi Suwabe) were dispatched for a strike, each with fourteen commandos. Eight were assigned to attack Yontan and four to Kadena. Four aircraft aborted the mission with engine problems, and three more were shot down; however, five managed to crash-land at Yontan Airfield during the confusion caused by a diversionary attack by some fifty IJAAF and IJN bombers and fighters.

Only one plane landed successfully. About ten surviving raiders, armed with submachine guns and various explosives then wreaked havoc on the supplies and nearby aircraft, killed two US servicemen, destroyed 70,000 US gallons (260,000 L) of fuel and nine aircraft, and damaged 29 more before being nearly annihilated by the defenders. One member of the raiding party survived and was able to make his way across the battlefield, reaching the Thirty-Second Army Headquarters (Okinawa) around 12 June.

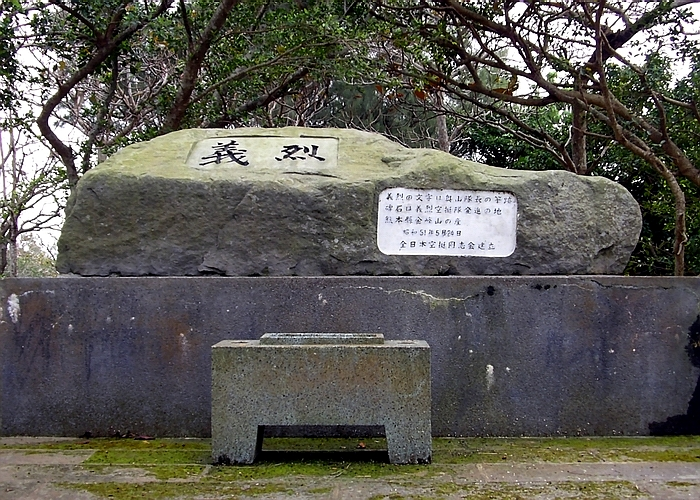
Memorial to Giretsu Commandos in Itoman, Okinawa

A second large-scale attack on bases in the Marianas with the specific intent of destroying B-29 Superfortress bombers was again planned with 60 transports and 900 commandos for the nights of 19–23 August 1945 (Operation Ken-gou). On 15 August, Japan surrendered and the operation was canceled.

== Uniforms and equipment ==
Giretsu personnel wore special hand-made camouflage uniforms made from ink, and carried special equipment. Most were armed with Type 100 submachine guns, Type 99 rifles, Type 99 light machine guns, and Type 30 bayonets, Type 89 grenade dischargers, Type 99 grenades and Type 99 mines, as well as Type 94 8 mm pistols.

== See also ==
- Commando
- Teishin Shudan
- Raid on Yontan Airfield
- Japanese marine paratroopers of World War II
- Kaoru Special Attack Corps
