= 16th Antiaircraft Artillery Battalion =

- Active: 10 Nov 1942 – 30 Nov 1945
- Country: United States of America
- Branch: United States Marine Corps
- Type: Air Defense/Coastal Defense
- Size: ~800 men
- Part of: V Amphibious Corps
- Engagements: World War II; *Battle of Okinawa

Commanders
- Current commander: N/A
- Notable commanders: Richard P. Ross Jr.

The 16th Antiaircraft Artillery Battalion (16th AAA Bn) was a United States Marine Corps antiaircraft unit that served during World War II. Formed in 1942 as the 16th Defense Battalion, its original mission was the air and coastal defense of advanced naval bases. During the war the battalion defended Johnston Island, Hawaii and Tinian and took part in combat operations at Okinawa. The battalion returned to the United States after the war and was decommissioned on 30 November 1945 at Marine Corps Base Camp Pendleton, California.

== History ==
=== Organization ===
16th Defense Battalion Table of Organization (1943):

- Headquarters and Service Battery
  - Light tank platoon
  - Searchlight Batteries
- Seacoast Artillery Group
  - Group Headquarters
  - 2 x 155mm Gun Batteries
- AAA Group
  - Group Headquarters
  - 3 x 90mm Gun batteries
- Special Weapons Group
  - Group Headquarters
  - 40mm Battery (w/ 12 guns)
  - 20mm Antiaircraft Gun Battery
  - .50cal Antiaircraft Machine Gun Battery

The 16th Antiaircraft Artillery Battalion was commissioned on November 10, 1942 at Johnston Island. Personnel and equipment for the new battalion came from the re-designation of the Marine Defense Force, Naval Air Station Johnston Island. The battalion remained at Johnston Island providing air defense until March 22, 1944 when it was transferred to Kauai, Territory of Hawaii. Not all of the battalion departed Johnston Island as approximately 450 personnel remained for defensive purposes.

As the war progressed, the Marine Corps removed coastal artillery from the defense battalions in order to form additional heavy artillery units for the Fleet Marine Force. Because of the divestiture of the coastal defense mission, the battalion was re-designated as the 16th Antiaircraft Artillery Battalion on April 19, 1944. For the next few months, the battalion had to grow back to regular strength and continue training. On November 11, 1944, the battalion was transferred to the 1st Provisional Antiaircraft Artillery Group prior to deploying for combat operations in the Western Pacific.

The battalion continued training on Kauai until December 12, 1944 when it received a dispatch ordering it to quickly prepare for deployment to Tinian. On December 22, 1944, 57 officers and 1283 men from the battalion sailed from Nawiliwili onboard the SS Afoundria. The battalion's equipment left the next day on board the SS Samuel G. Howe.

=== Okinawa ===
On March 12, 1945, the assault echelon of the battalion departed Tinian and sailed towards Okinawa, Japan for the upcoming amphibious landing. The assault echelon disembarked naval shipping on April 8, 1945 and was initially responsible for providing air defense for the 1st Marine Division. On April 20 the battalion was retasked to provide light anti-aircraft protection for the III Marine Amphibious Corps landing at Hagushi and supplement the defenses of Yontan Airfield with their heavy antiaircraft guns. The remainder of the battalion arrived in a number of different waves during May 1945. During the Battle of Okinawa the 16th AAA Battalion was one of four AAA battalions that comprised the 1st Provisional Antiaircraft Artillery Group.

On May 11, 1945 an SCR-270 crew from the battalion was attacked by 12-14 Japanese soldiers. 11 Japanese were killed in the incident and 1 Marine was killed in action (KIA) and six more wounded in action (WIA). Two Marines from the battalion were KIA during the battle and another thirty two were WIA. The battalion remained on Okinawa providing air defense until September 20, 1945.

=== Decommissioning ===
On October 22, personnel of the 16th AAA Battalion embarked on the USS Meriwether (APA-203) and sailed for the United States. The battalion arrived at San Diego, California on 8 November 1945. On 27 November 1945 the 16th Antiaircraft Artillery Battalion was decommissioned.

== Notable members ==
- Gil Hodges - first basemen for the Brooklyn/Los Angeles Dodgers and manager for the New York Mets.

== Unit awards ==
A unit citation or commendation is an award bestowed upon an organization for the action cited. Members of the unit who participated in said actions are allowed to wear on their uniforms the awarded unit citation. The 16th Antiaircraft Artillery Battalion has been presented with the following awards:

Streamer	Award	Year(s)	Additional Info
	Presidential Unit Citation Streamer	17 April - 14 July 1945	Okinawa
	Asiatic-Pacific Campaign Streamer with one Bronze Star		Okinawa
	World War II Victory Streamer	1941–1945	Pacific War

== See also ==
- Marine Defense Battalions
- List of United States Marine Corps aviation support units
