= 2nd Antiaircraft Artillery Battalion =

2d Antiaircraft Artillery Battalion
- Active: 1 Mar 1940 – 28 Nov 1945
- Country: United States of America
- Branch: United States Marine Corps
- Type: Air Defense/Coastal Defense
- Size: ~1,300 men (1942)
- Part of: V Amphibious Corps
- Engagements: World War II; *Battle of Tarawa; *Battle of Okinawa

Commanders
- Current commander: N/A
- Notable commanders: Bertram A. Bone; Thomas E. Bourke; Charles I. Murray

The 2d Antiaircraft Artillery Battalion (2d AAA Bn) was a United States Marine Corps antiaircraft unit that served during World War II. Formed in 1940 as the 2d Defense Battalion, its original mission was to provide air and coastal defense for advanced naval bases. During the war the battalion defended Hawaii, Tutuila in American Samoa and Guam and took part in combat operations at Tarawa Atoll and Okinawa. The battalion returned to the United States after the war and was decommissioned at Marine Corps Base Camp Pendleton, California on 28 November 1945.

== History ==
=== History ===
==== Formation and early training ====
The 2d Defense Battalion was commissioned on March 1, 1940, at San Diego, California. Lieutenant Colonel Bertram A. Bone was the first commanding officer of the battalion. Because of the Marine Corps' rapid growth beginning in 1939, there was a great deal of movement amongst leadership as the institution struggled to keep pace. This led to the battalion having five commanding officers by the time the war began in December 1941. The battalion was the only defense battalion still stateside when war broke out. It deployed to Hawaii in December 1941 and quickly prepared for follow on tasking. The battalion arrived in American Samoa in January 1942 to assist the 7th Defense Battalion with air and coastal defense of the region.

==== Battle of Tarawa, training on Hawaii and Guam ====
In November 1943 the 2d Defense Battalion was assigned to the V Amphibious Corps for the Battle of Tarawa. They came ashore on November 23 after most of the battle was complete in order to garrison the island against Japanese counterattack from the air. For this operation the battalion was reinforced by one half of the 2d Airdrome Battalion which came in from the Ellice Islands. Following operations at Tarawa the battalion was moved to Hawaii.

As the war progressed, the Marine Corps removed coastal artillery from the defense battalions in order to form additional heavy artillery units for the Fleet Marine Force. Because of the divestiture of the coastal defense mission, the battalion was re-designated as the 2d Antiaircraft Artillery Battalion on 16 April 1944 while on Kauai. The battalion continued training on Kauai until December 12, 1944, when it received a dispatch ordering it to quickly prepare for deployment to Guam. On December 26, 1944, 56 officers and 1286 men from the battalion sailed from Nawiliwili on board the SS Agwiprince

==== Battle of Okinawa ====
The 2d AAA Battalion was one of four AAA battalions that formed the 1st Provisional Antiaircraft Artillery Group during the Battle of Okinawa. During the battle they were emplaced near Yontan Airfield in order to protect the airfield against Japanese air raids and kamikaze attacks.

At the end of the war the battalion returned to the United States and was decommissioned on 28 November 1945.

== See also ==
- Marine Defense Battalions
- List of United States Marine Corps aviation support units
