= USS Jerauld =

Us navy battleship

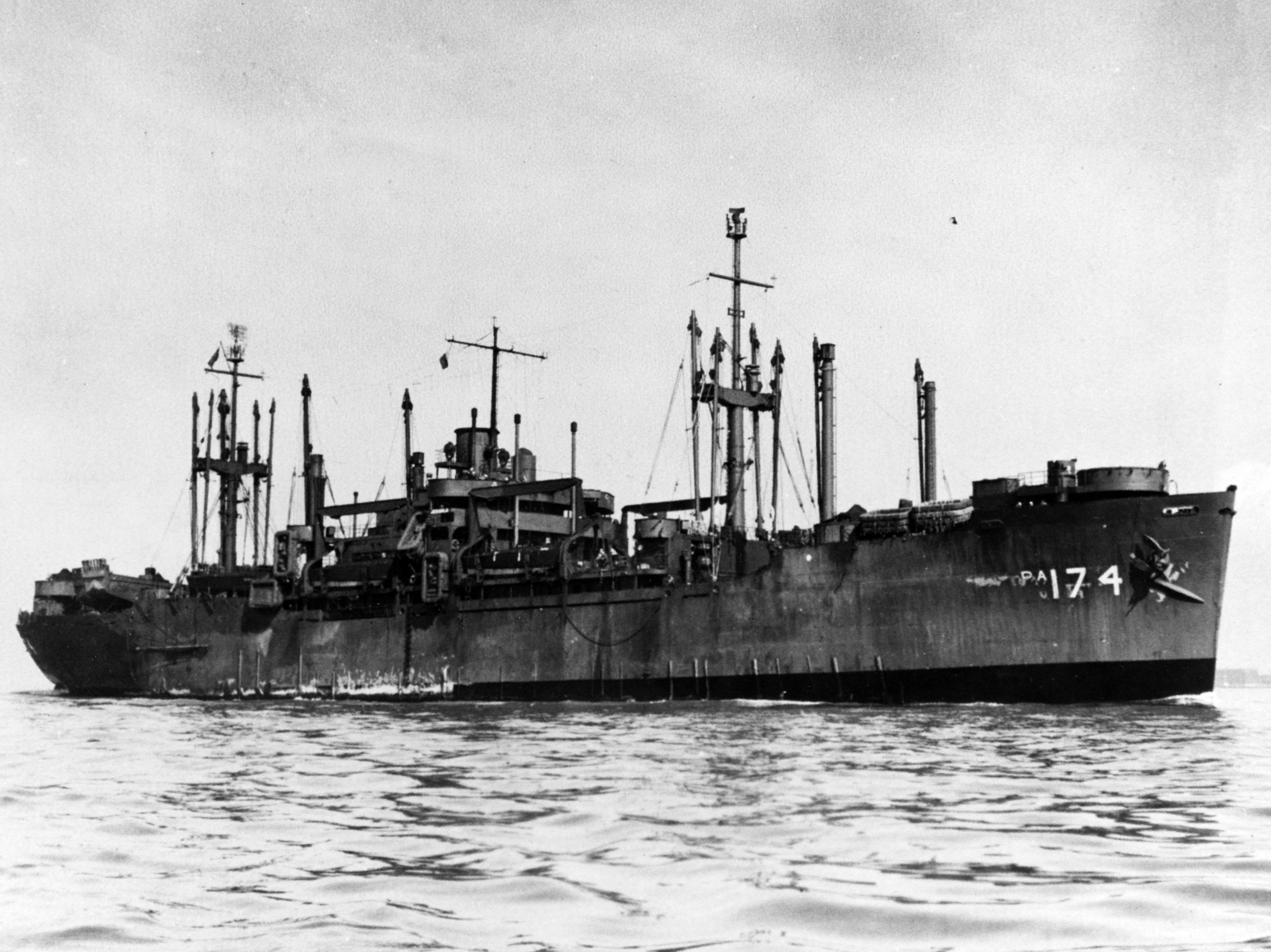

History

United States
- Name: USS Jerauld
- Namesake: Jerauld County, South Dakota
- Ordered: as type VC2-S-AP5
- Laid down: date unknown
- Launched: 3 November 1944
- Acquired: 28 November 1944
- Commissioned: 28 November 1944
- Decommissioned: 6 May 1946
- Stricken: date unknown
- Fate: Sold for scrapping 17 May 1974

General characteristics
- Displacement: 12,450 tons (full load)
- Length: 455 ft 0 in (138.68 m)
- Beam: 62 ft 0 in (18.90 m)
- Draught: 24 ft 0 in (7.32 m)
- Speed: 19 knots
- Capacity: 150,000 cu. ft, 2,900 tons
- Complement: 56 Officers 480 Enlisted
- Armament: one 5 in (130 mm) gun mount, four 40 mm gun mounts, ten 20 mm gun mounts

USS Jerauld (APA-174) was a Haskell-class attack transport in service with the United States Navy from 1944 to 1946. She was scrapped in 1974.

== History ==
Jerauld was launched under United States Maritime Commission contract by Oregon Shipbuilding Co., Portland, Oregon, 3 November 1944; sponsored by Mrs. Gloria Dahlberg; acquired and commissioned at Astoria, Oregon, 28 November 1944.

=== World War II ===
After undergoing shakedown off California, Jerauld sailed from Seattle, Washington, 5 February 1945 carrying Army flyers and civilian workers to Pearl Harbor. She arrived 16 February and began 4 weeks of amphibious exercises in the Hawaiian Islands.

The new attack transport sailed from Pearl Harbor 15 March with U.S. marines destined for Okinawa. En route she touched at the great American bases at Eniwetok and Ulithi, arriving Okinawa 17 April. She remained off the bitterly contested island for 5 days debarking a Marine antiaircraft battalion and undergoing frequent air attacks before sailing for Saipan 22 April.

Jerauld next steamed to Guadalcanal; and, after her arrival 10 May, she embarked troop units for redeployment to Guam and Saipan. The ship departed Saipan 23 June for her second voyage to Okinawa, this time with Army Engineers needed for the construction of all-important airfields on the island. She remained off Okinawa from 27 June until 6 July when she sailed with more than 250 battle casualties destined for hospitals on Saipan. Jerauld then proceeded to San Francisco, California, where she arrived 26 July.

The battle-tried transport remained in the United States until after Japan's surrender, Sailing 16 August for the Philippines, she arrived Manila 6 September and embarked occupation troops. After stopping at Lingayen Gulf for additional units she steamed to Wakayama 7 October to land occupation soldiers. The ship visited several Japanese ports in support of the operation and made another voyage to the Philippines for troops. She sailed from Nagoya 26 October, embarked returnees in the Philippines, and steamed by way of Pearl Harbor for San Diego, California. Jerauld then made one additional voyage to the Philippines as part of Operation Magic Carpet, bringing many combat troops back to the United States.

=== Decommissioning and fate ===
Jerauld then sailed from San Francisco 20 February 1946 via the Panama Canal Zone for Norfolk, Virginia. Arriving 11 March, she decommissioned 6 May, was returned to the United States Maritime Commission, and was placed in the Maritime Commission's National Defense Reserve Fleet in the James River, Virginia, where she remained. Jerauld was struck from the Navy List on 21 May 1946 and finally sold for scrapping 17 May 1974 to Intershitra Corporation, Netherlands, for $771,500.

== Awards ==
Jerauld received one battle star for World War II service.
