= USS Meriwether =

1944 Haskell-class attack transport

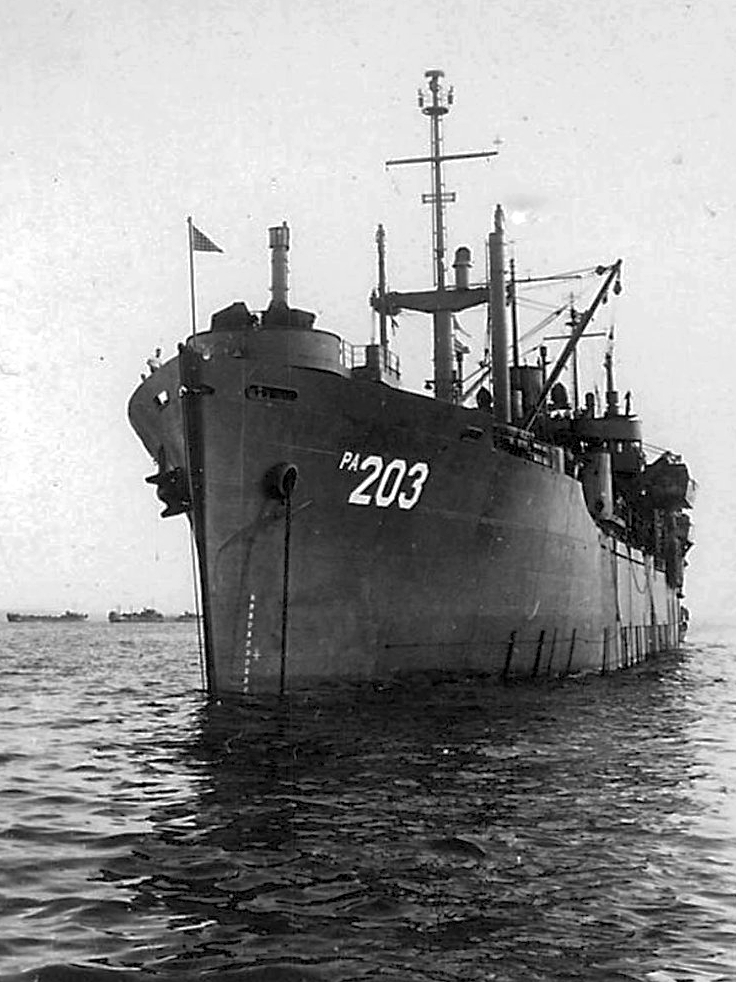
- USS Meriwether APA-203 at anchor, date and place unknown

History

United States
- Name: USS Meriwether (APA-203)
- Namesake: Meriwether County, Georgia
- Builder: Kaiser Shipbuilding
- Yard number: MCV No. 671
- Laid down: 18 February 1942
- Launched: 18 October 1944
- Sponsored by: Mrs A. C. Barnett
- Commissioned: 7 November 1944
- Decommissioned: 14 August 1946
- Stricken: 1 October 1958
- Honours and awards: One battle star for World War II service
- Fate: Scrapped

General characteristics
- Class & type: Haskell-class attack transport
- Displacement: 6,873 t.(lt) 14,837 t.(fl)
- Length: 455 ft
- Beam: 62 ft
- Draft: 28 ft 1 in
- Propulsion: 1 x Allis-Chalmers geared turbine, 2 x Combustion Engineering header-type boilers, 1 x propeller, designed shaft horsepower 8,500
- Speed: 18 knots
- Boats & landing craft carried: 2 x LCM, 12 x LCVP, 3 x LCPU
- Capacity: 86 Officers 1,475 Enlisted
- Crew: 56 Officers, 480 enlisted
- Armament: 1 x 5"/38 caliber dual-purpose gun mount, 1 x quad 40mm gun mounts, 4 x twin 40 mm gun mounts, 10 x single 20mm gun mounts
- Notes: MARCOM hull type VC2-S-AP5

USS Meriwether (APA-203) was a Haskell-class attack transport that saw service with the US Army in World War II.

Meriwether was laid down 27 July 1944 by Kaiser Shipbuilding of Vancouver, Washington, launched 18 October 1944 and commissioned 4 November 1944.

== Operational history ==
=== World War II ===
After a month of amphibious training off the California coast, Meriwether departed San Diego 8 January 1945 with Marine Corps replacements for Hawaii. Arriving on the 14th, she discharged her passengers and underwent further training in preparation for the Okinawa campaign.

==== Invasion of Okinawa ====
On 19 February, the attack transport began loading troops and equipment of the 10th Army and, on the 22d, sailed westward. Steaming via Eniwetok, Ulithi, Palau, and Leyte, she arrived off Okinawa early 1 April. After landing troops and equipment amidst frequent kamikaze attacks, one of which she helped splash on the 3rd, she departed for Saipan 15 April with wounded.

Discharging the casualties there on the 18th, she continued on to Pearl Harbor and San Francisco where she embarked Navy support personnel and got underway to return to Okinawa 6 June. She arrived 24 July, discharged her passengers and cargo, but due to air raid alerts and a typhoon, did not depart until 6 August.

==== After hostilities ====
At Guam on the 14th, she received word of the Japanese surrender and began loading cargo and troops of the 6th Marine Division for the initial occupation of the Tokyo Bay area. Landing them there on the 30th, she sailed for Saipan where she again loaded occupation forces, this time for Nagasaki.

On 15 October, Meriiwether was detached from occupation support duties and assigned to Operation Magic Carpet, returning servicemen to the United States. She continued such runs until the end of the year, when she joined the 19th Fleet.

=== Decommissioning ===
Meriwether was struck from the Navy Vessel Register along with at least 20 of her Haskell class sister ships on 1 October 1959, and transferred to the Maritime Administration. As a unit of the National Defense Reserve Fleet, she was berthed at Suisun Bay into 1969. She was later scrapped.

=== Decorations ===
Meriwether received one battle star for World War II service.
