= Battle of Viru Harbor =

Battle of the New Georgia campaign during World War II

- Part of the Pacific Theater of World War II
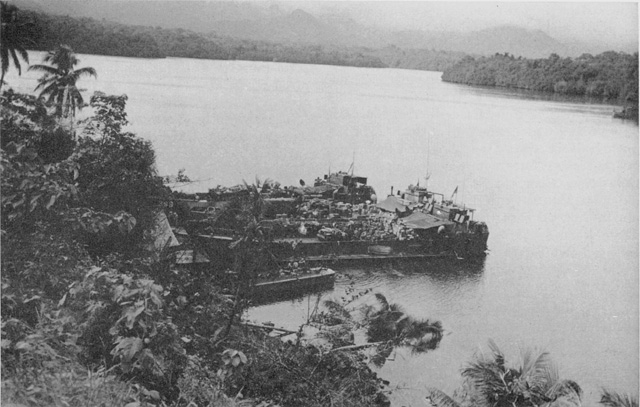
- U.S. Navy landing craft unload troops at Viru shortly after the harbor was secured by Marine Raiders on 1 July 1943
Date	28 June – 1 July 1943
Location	New Georgia, Solomon Islands 8.50°S 157.73°E
Result	American victory

Belligerents
United States	Japan

Commanders and leaders
(United States) Michael S. Currin	(Empire of Japan) Minoru Sasaki; Genjiro Hirata; Saburo Okamura; Masao Hara

Strength
1 infantry company 2 Marine companies 1 artillery battery	245

Casualties and losses
13 killed, 15 wounded	61 killed, ~100 wounded

The Battle of Viru Harbor was a battle of the Pacific campaign of World War II that took place on New Georgia island during the New Georgia campaign from 28 June – 1 July 1943. It was one of the first actions of the campaign and involved an overland advance by elements of a Marine Raider battalion, supported by a United States Army infantry company. Supported by airstrikes, the Marines carried out an enveloping attack on the Japanese defenders around the harbor and forced them to withdraw. The harbor was subsequently used by US forces to support further operations, although plans to build a PT boat base in the area were later canceled when the harbor was found to be unsuitable.

== Background ==
The battle was one of the first actions of the New Georgia campaign. Located on the southeastern coast of New Georgia island, Viru Harbor lies along a key avenue of approach towards Rendova and Munda Point. In formulating their plans to secure the New Georgia islands, US planners assessed that several preliminary operations were required ahead of the main operation to capture the Japanese airfield at Munda Point. This included the capture of Viru Harbor. It offered the Allies an important sheltered harbor that could support lines of supply as they advanced north from the Solomons towards Bougainville. Consequently, they planned to use the area as a staging base for landing craft proceeding towards Rendova, where the main US force would be built up prior to landing around Zanana and advancing to Munda Point to capture the Japanese airfield there.

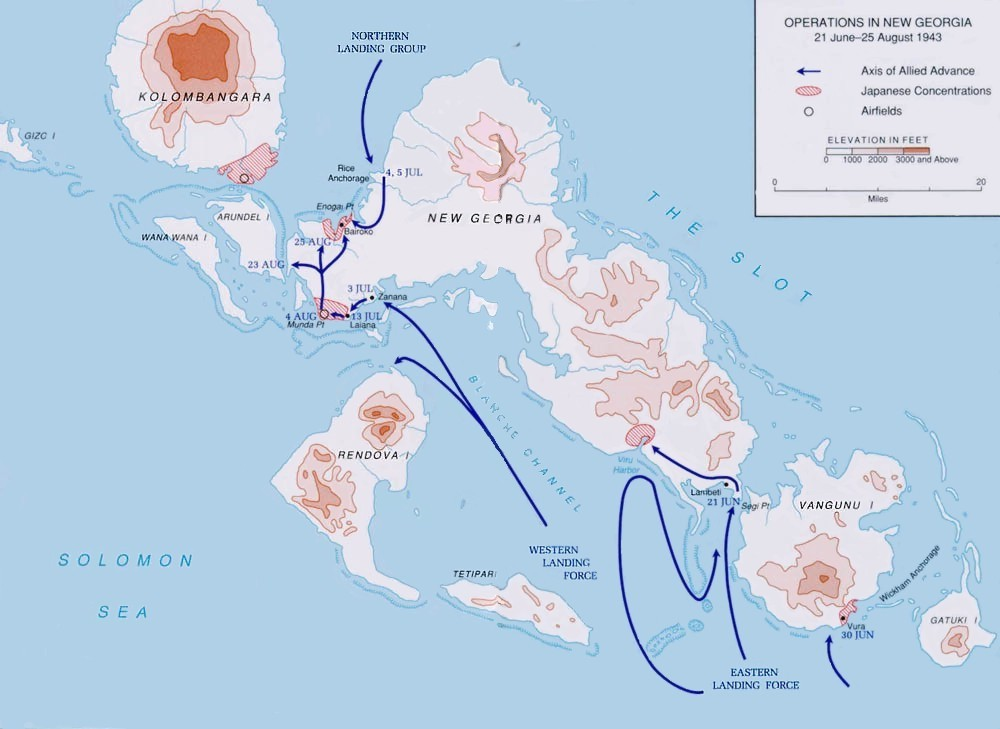
Allied landings in the New Georgias

Other preliminary operations were envisaged to capture Wickham Anchorage to secure a staging base further south to provide a chain to support the movement of troops and equipment from the Russells and Guadalcanal. Another operation was also envisaged to capture Segi Point as a location for an airfield; these operations were to be conducted simultaneously at the end of June, but the Segi Point operation was brought forward because of concerns about the safety of Allied intelligence personnel, including District Officer Donald Gilbert Kennedy, a New Zealand coastwatcher, operating in the area.

Segi Point was subsequently secured by an unopposed landing from two companies from Lieutenant Colonel Michael S. Currin's 4th Marine Raider Battalion (Companies O and P) that had embarked upon the high-speed transports Dent and Waters. The Marines were later reinforced by two companies from the 103rd Infantry Regiment (Companies A and D), which landed on 22 June from the transports Schley and Crosby. Currin's force then established a defensive position and began patrolling the nearby area.

== Battle ==
The original US plan for the capture of Viru Harbor involved B Company, 103rd Infantry Regiment (Captain Raymond Kinch) coming ashore directly inside the harbor from three destroyer-transports (Hopkins, Kilty and Crosby), while Companies O and P from the 4th Marine Raider Battalion—other elements from the battalion had been sent to secure Wickham Anchorage—advanced overland from Regi, near Lambeti Village, to the south. The Segi beachhead would be held by the Companies A and D, 103rd Infantry Regiment. The Marines had begun moving to Regi by rubber boats from Segi Point on 27 June, having arrived at Segi Point on 21 June during the preliminary operation to protect Kennedy and his small group of local forces. The troops from B Company, 103rd Infantry Regiment were reinforced by part of D Company, 103rd Infantry Regiment and were supported by a battery of the 70th Coast Artillery Battalion and part of Company D, 20th Naval Construction Battalion. These troops formed part of Colonel Daniel H. Hundley's eastern landing force.

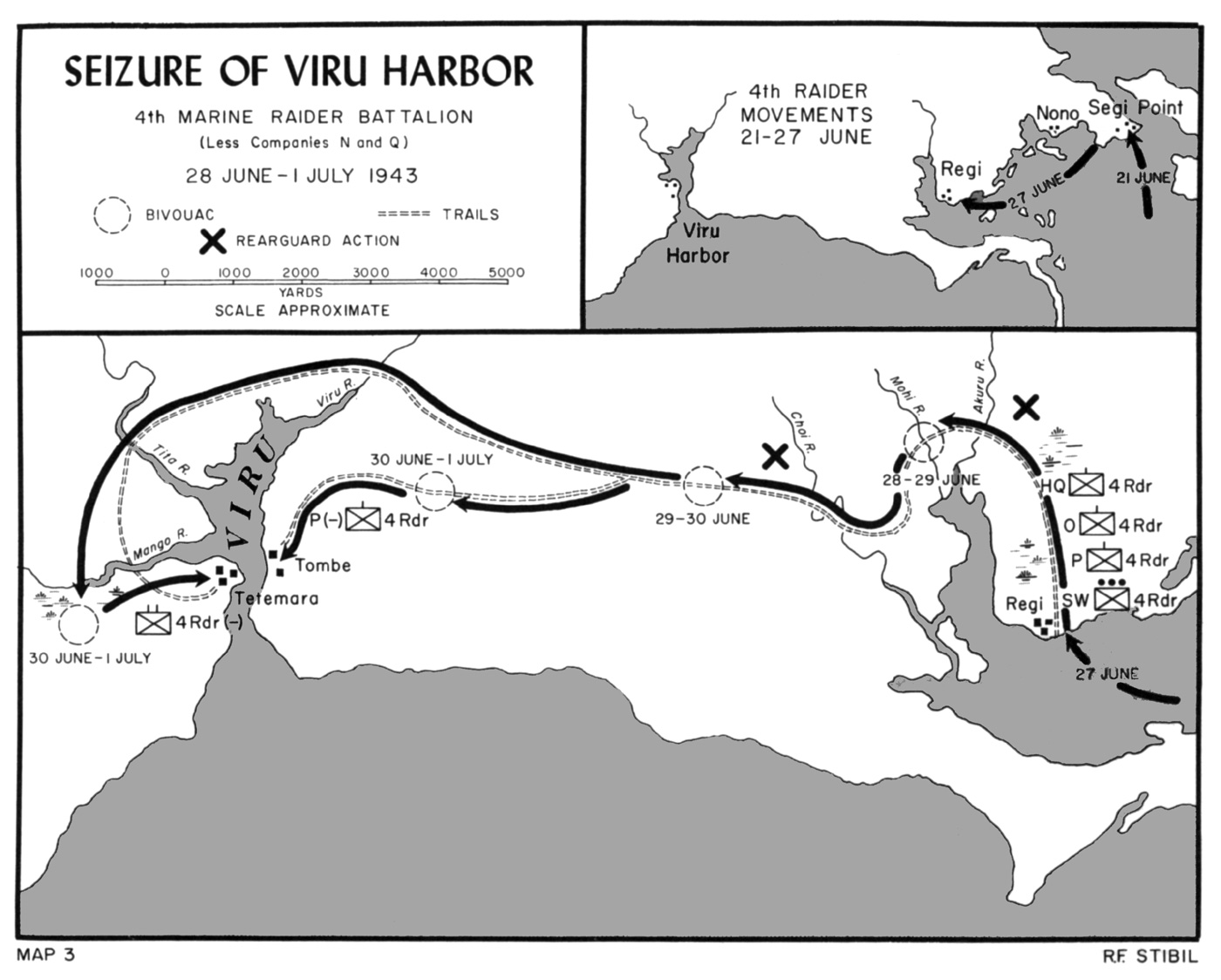
Seizure of Viru harbor

The Japanese troops defending the area were commanded by First Lieutenant Takagi and amounted to 245 men from a company from Major Masao Hara's 1st Battalion, 229th Infantry Regiment (Colonel Genjiro Hirata), which had been detached from Major General Minoru Sasaki's Southeast Detachment. Hara's infantry company was reinforced by personnel from Commander Saburo Okumura's Kure 6th and the Yokosuka 7th Special Naval Landing Forces under Commander Takeda Kashin. Together these units formed part of the 8th Combined Special Naval Landing Force. Fire support included several guns including a 3-inch coast defense gun, four 80 mm guns, and eight other guns of varying types and calibers.

The US destroyer-transports entered the harbor early on 30 June but found that the Marines' advance had been delayed. Coming under fire from a Japanese 3-inch field gun from Tetemara Point, and having been unable to establish radio contact with Currin's Marines, US Navy Commander Stanley Leith decided to withdraw from the harbor. After waiting offshore for the agreed upon signal from the Marines while remaining out of range of the defending Japanese coastal artillery, the ships moved towards Segi Point instead, landing the company from the 103rd Infantry at Nono. Leith assessed that the Marines were potentially in trouble and needed assistance, which could be provided by Kinch's company if they advanced overland to link up with them. As the landing force departed Viru Harbor, Hara reported that his forces had repulsed the landing attempt.

Meanwhile, the Marine Raiders' approach saw them advance 12 miles (19 km) through dense terrain, and had been delayed by several skirmishes with the Imperial Japanese Navy and Army troops that were guarding the approaches to Viru Harbor. During the advance, Currin's men clashed with Japanese troops around the Lambeti Plantation on both sides of the Lakuru River on 28 June and then again around the Choi River on 29 June. He then received intelligence that the main concentration of Japanese forces was around the western shore of the harbor at Tetemara with an outpost across the harbor at Tombe.

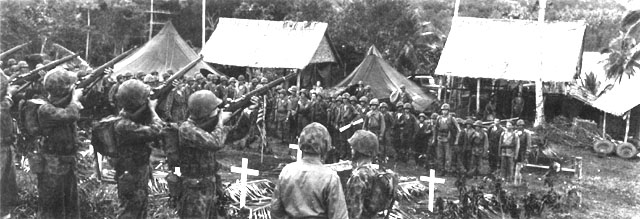
Funeral for Marines killed during the fighting for Viru Harbor

The Marines stopped short of the junction of the Tetemara–Tombe trails, close to their objective (Viru Harbor) on the evening of 30 June, and prepared to launch their attack the following day. Currin's men subsequently launched two-pronged attack the following morning; two platoons were detached to attack Tombe from the northeast, while the rest of the regiment skirted around the harbor to the north, crossing the Viru, Tita and Mango Rivers, and assaulted Tetemara from the southwest. The outpost at Tombe was quickly overwhelmed around 08:45 on 1 July, while the main body of Marines drove the Japanese out of Viru in a running battle that lasted until the early afternoon. They were supported by preliminary air attacks by 17 US Navy Dauntless dive-bombers, while landing craft with combat supplies (ammunition and fuel) entered the harbor to ensure rapid resupply. As Hara's troops withdrew into the jungle, the Marines began constructing defensive positions to wait for reinforcement.

== Aftermath ==
Casualties amounted to 13 US personnel killed and 15 wounded, while 61 Japanese were killed and around 100 were wounded. The surviving members of Hara's 1st Battalion, 229th Infantry Regiment, totaling about 170 men, spent the next two weeks withdrawing back to Munda where they were concentrated around Lambeti Plantation—halfway between Munda Point and Ilangana—during preparations for a counterattack in mid-July. On 4 July, Viru Harbor was occupied by a company of the 103rd Infantry Regiment which followed the Marines' advance overland and US Navy Seabees and ships. The troops from 4th Marine Raider Battalion and 103rd Infantry Regiment held the area until 9 July when they were relieved; Currin's men returned to Guadalcanal. They were later sent to reinforce Colonel Harry B. Liversedge's northern landing group around Bairoko, arriving off Enogai Point on 18 July.

Following the battle, Segi Point was developed into an airfield, while Viru Harbor was built into a staging base for supporting the Landings on Rendova and for the Drive on Munda Point. Plans to establish a PT boat base in the harbor were canceled when it was determined to be unsuitable. Seabees from the 20th Naval Construction Battalion remained until October 1943, stevedoring cargo, developing roads, constructing a marine railway, and building beach defenses. They also repaired the existing 50-by-30-foot (15.2 by 9.1 m) wharf with coral and coconut tree logs.
