= 2nd 90mm Antiaircraft Artillery Gun Battalion =

- Active: 1 Feb 1942 – 15 Sept 1956
- Country: United States of America
- Branch: United States Marine Corps
- Type: Air Defense/Coastal Defense
- Role: Defense battalion, Antiaircraft
- Size: ~1,300 men (1942)
- Part of: Inactive
- Nickname: Fighting Ninth
- Engagements: World War II; *Guantanamo Bay, Cuba; *Guadalcanal campaign *New Georgia campaign *Battle of Guam (1944)

Commanders
- Current commander: N/A

The 2nd 90mm Antiaircraft Artillery Gun Battalion was a United States Marine Corps antiaircraft unit that was active during the 1940s & 1950s. Originally formed during World War II as the 9th Defense Battalion, the battalion took part in combat operations on Guadalcanal, Rendova, Munda Point, and Guam. Like most other Marine defense battalions, the unit was re-designated in September 1944, becoming the 9th Antiaircraft Artillery Battalion. Returning to the United States in 1946, the battalion was again re-designated, this time as the 1st Antiaircraft Artillery Battalion. The battalion received its final designation as the 2nd 90mm Antiaircraft Artillery Battalion on August 21, 1950. It was later decommissioned on September 15, 1956, at Marine Corps Base 29 Palms, California.

== History ==
=== World War II ===
==== Formation and Guantanamo Bay ====
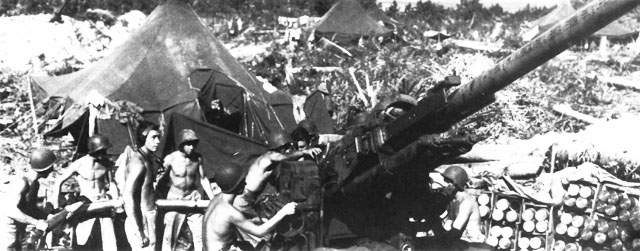
US Marines from the 9th Defense Battalion on New Georgia or Rendova manning a 90mm AA gun around July or August 1943.

The 9th Defense Battalion was commissioned at Marine Barracks, Parris Island, South Carolina on February 1, 1942. Originally a training detachment, it consisted of 75 enlisted men sent over from the 5th Artillery Group located at Parris Island. On February 13, 1942, the battalion departed from Naval Station Norfolk, Virginia on board the USS William P. Biddle (APA-8), sailed through axis submarine infested waters, arriving at Guantanamo Bay, Cuba on February 19. The battalion consisted of 3 batteries 90mm AA artillery; 2 batteries 155 mm "Long Tom" seacoast artillery; 3 batteries each 40mm, 20mm and 50 caliber weapons designed as both anti-tank and anti-air artillery. Together with fire control apparatus, transport, and support units the battalion comprised about 1,300 men.

At Guantanamo Bay the battalion was charged with two missions. The first was to quickly develop into a fully operational defense battalion and the other was to assist in the defense of the Naval Base. While in Cuba the battalion trained extensively in both infantry tactics and its air and coastal defense missions. On October 4, 1942, battalion personnel and equipment were loaded onto the USS Kenmore (AP-62), SS Robin Wentley, and USS Fairisle headed for an unknown destination.

==== Guadalcanal ====
After Guantanamo Bay the battalion was sent through the Panama Canal to Nouméa, New Caledonia where equipment was trans-loaded onto the attack transport USS Hunter Liggett that took the battalion to Guadalcanal in November 1942. The battalion setup its weapons at Koli Point, and promptly shot down a dozen enemy planes. By May 1943, malaria had taken a heavy toll on the battalion thus requiring a significant influx of replacements.

==== Rendova and New Georgia ====
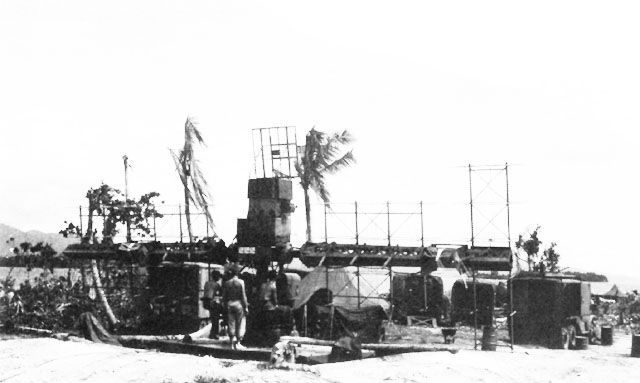
An SCR-268 radar set-up by the 9th Defense Battalion on New Georgia after the capture of the airfield from Japanese forces, August 1943.

In June 1943 the battalion left Guadalcanal and took part in the Landings on Rendova, set up its artillery and fought off attempts by the Japanese to regain control. The battalion's 155 mm "long Tom" artillery shelled Japanese positions on New Georgia across the Blanche Channel and the unit's 90 mm batteries and Special Weapons Group shot down 24 Japanese aircraft during July. At noon on July 2, the battalion's SCR-602 and SCR-270 radars were inoperable when a large Japanese formation of aircraft attacked the Rendova beachhead. This attack killed more than 30 Americans, wounded another 200+ and caused extensive damage to infrastructure, fuel dumps and the battalion's 155 mm artillery. 15% of the 155mm artillery battery was killed or wounded in the raid. On July 4, another large Japanese air raid was sent against the Rendova beachhead. A flight of 16 Betty Bombers and their escorts made it through the allied combat air patrol. Before the bombers expended their ordnance, they were engaged by the 90mm guns of Captain Bill Tracy's "E" Battery. Battery E succeeded in downing 12 of the bombers and one fighter while expending only 88 rounds of ammunition.

Elements were progressively moved onto the island of New Georgia to support the Drive on Munda Point, defend against Japanese forces that broke into the rear lines, and later defend the Munda Airfield and assist in the operations to seize the surrounding islands (e.g. during the Battle of Arundel Island).

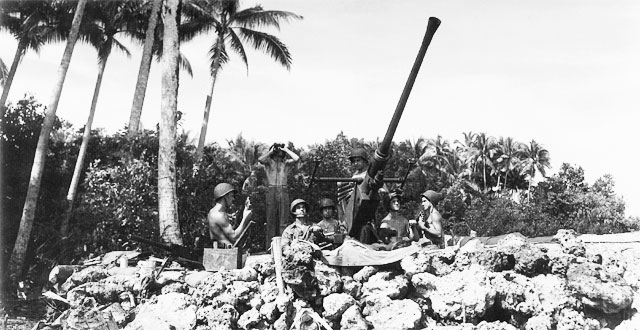
The 9th Defense Battalion deployed light antiaircraft guns, such as this Bofors 40mm weapon, in the Solomons on Rendova and New Georgia, both to protect the Zanana beachhead and to support the accelerating advance against the Munda airfield.

After securing New Georgia the battalion was moved to Mbanika in the Russell Islands for a period of rest and relaxation prior to its next assignment that involved the recapture of Guam in the Marianas Islands.

==== Guam ====
The battalion landed near Agana, Guam on July 21, 1944. They were tasked with air defense and coastal and perimeter defense of the area from Agat south to Bangi Point. On Guam most of the Japanese defenders retreated to the cliffs at the northern end of the island where thousands committed suicide by jumping to their deaths. The Battalion suffered from very high rates of dengue fever during the Guam campaign and while this was not fatal it did incapacitate many Marines.

Like all other defense battalions, the unit was re-designated as the 9th Antiaircraft Artillery Battalion on September 1, 1944. The unit remained on Guam for the duration of the war and returned to Marine Corps Base Camp Lejeune, North Carolina in February 1946.

=== Late 1940s through 1956 ===
While still located in Apra Harbor, Guam the battalion was re-designated on May 12, 1946, as the 1st Antiaircraft Artillery Battalion. In August 1948, the battalion embarked departed Guam on board the USS George Clymer (APA-27) arriving at Courthouse Bay, Marine Corps Base Camp LeJeune, North Carolina on September 13, 1948. Upon establishing at Camp Geiger aboard MCB Camp LeJeune, the battalion continued to train in its primary mission of air defense. In October 1949, the battalion took part in Operation Normex, cold weather maneuvers that took place on the Labrador Peninsula, Canada. On November 3, 1949, the battalion was again re-designated, this time as the 1st 90mm Antiaircraft Artillery Gun Battalion. The last re-designation came less than a year later on August 21, 1950, when the battalion was retitled as the 2nd 90mm Antiaircraft Artillery Gun Battalion. The last name change was required when the reserve 1st 90mm Antiaircraft Artillery Gun Battalion was activated for service during the Korean War. The 2d 90mm AAA Gun Bn continued training aboard Camp Geiger until October 1953 at which time the battalion embarked upon LSTs for transport to the west coast. The LSTs docked in San Diego and the battalion convoyed to its new base at Marine Corps Training Center Twentynine Palms, California. The battalion was decommissioned on September 15, 1956.

== Unit awards ==
A unit citation or commendation is an award bestowed upon an organization for the action cited. Members of the unit who participated in said actions are allowed to wear on their uniforms the awarded unit citation. The 2nd 90mm Antiaircraft Artillery Gun Battalion has been presented with the following awards:

Streamer	Award	Year(s)	Additional Info
	Navy Unit Commendation Streamer with two Bronze Stars	1942-43, 1943, 1944	Guadalcanal, Rendova-New Georgia, Guam
	American Defense Service Streamer with one Bronze Star	1942	Cuba
	Asiatic-Pacific Campaign Streamer with three Bronze Stars		Guadalcanal, Southern Solomons, Rendova-New Georgia, Guam
	World War II Victory Streamer	1941–1945	Pacific War
	National Defense Service Streamer with three Bronze Stars	1950–1954	Korean War

== Gallery ==
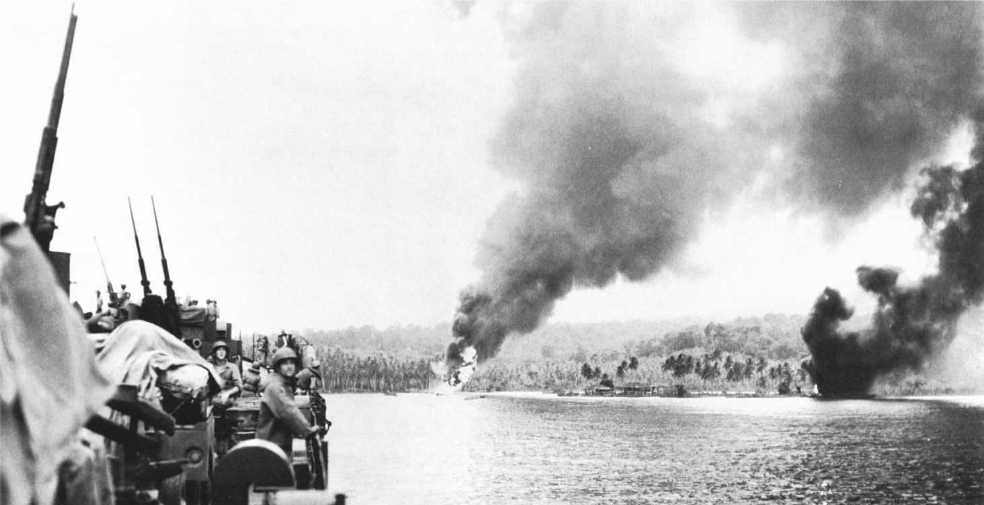
Landing on Rendova Island

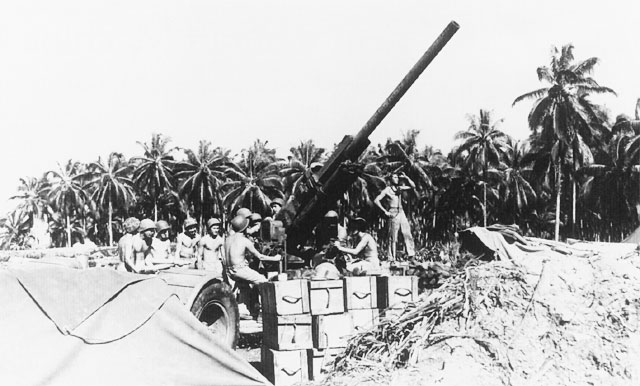
90mm antiaircraft guns on Rendova

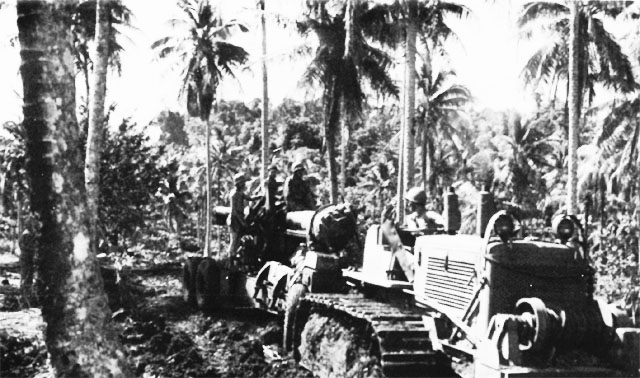
155mm "Long Tom" artillery being towed on Rendova

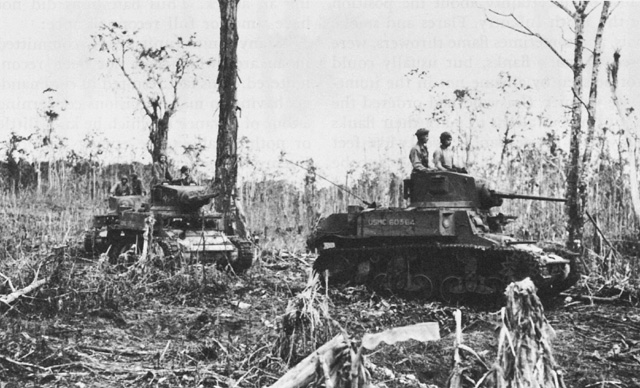
Light tanks supporting infantry action near Bibilo Hill. Munda, New Georgia, August 1943.

== See also ==
- Marine Defense Battalions
- List of United States Marine Corps aviation support units
