= New Georgia campaign =

Series of land and naval battles of the Pacific campaign of World War II

Coordinates: 8°30′S 157°20′E

New Georgia Campaign
- Part of the Solomon Islands campaign of World War II
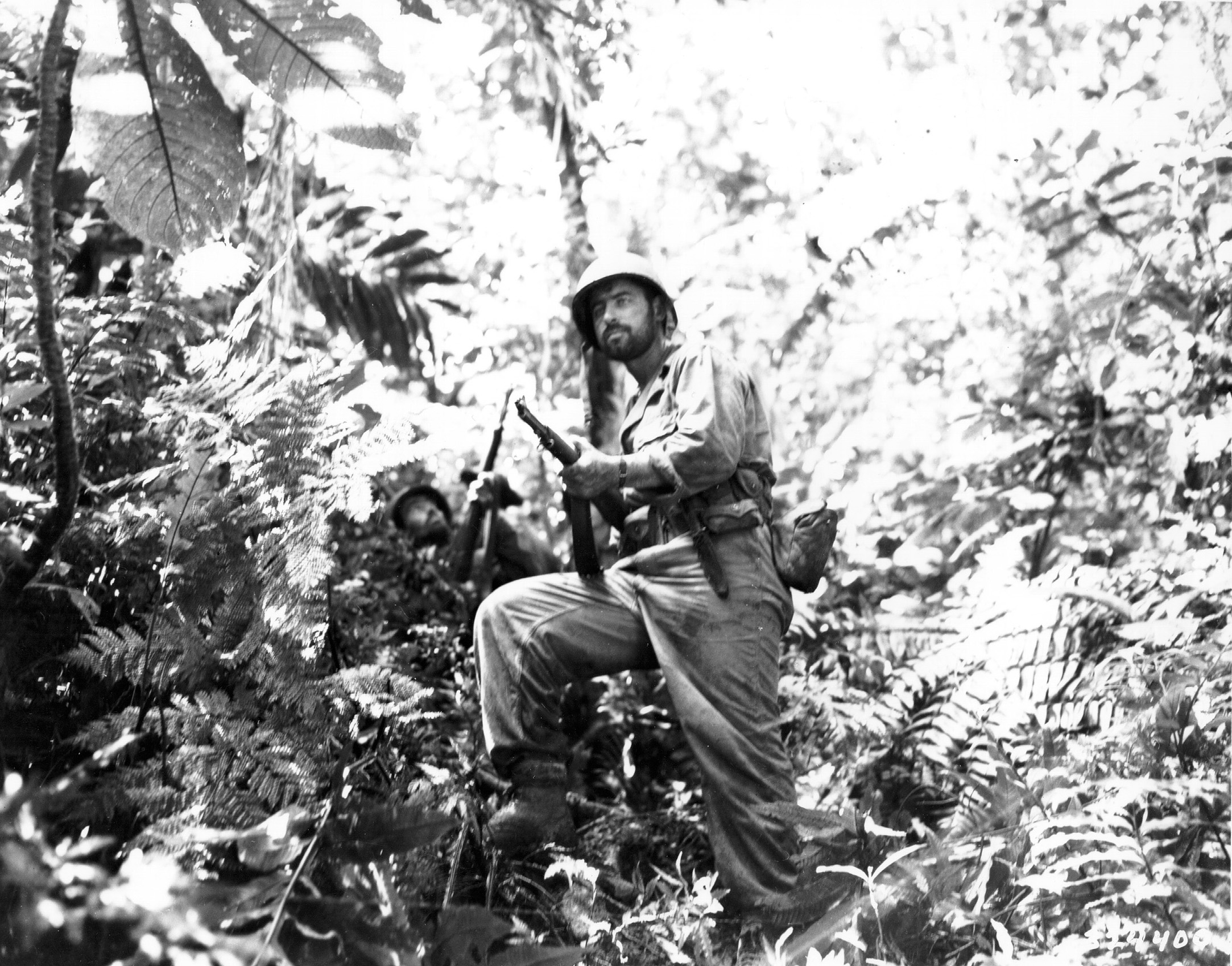
- Men of the United States 25th Infantry Division push through the jungle along the Zieta Trail on 12 August 1943
Date	30 June – 7 October 1943
Location	New Georgia Islands, Solomon Islands
Result	Allied victory

Belligerents
United States; New Zealand; Australia; British Solomon Islands	Japan

Commanders and leaders
South West Pacific Area: (United States) Douglas MacArthur; U.S. Navy: (United States) William F. Halsey (United States) Richmond K. Turner (United States) Theodore S. Wilkinson (United States) Frederick Moosbrugger (United States) Aaron S. Merrill (United States) Walden L. Ainsworth (United States) Thomas J. Ryan; U.S. Marines: (United States) Harry B. Liversedge; U.S. Army: (United States) Oscar W. Griswold (United States) Millard F. Harmon (United States) John H. Hester (United States) Robert B. McClure N.Z. Army: (Dominion of New Zealand) H. E. Barrowclough	Commander-in-Chief: (Empire of Japan) Hisaichi Terauchi; I.J. Navy: (Empire of Japan) Jinichi Kusaka (Empire of Japan) Teruo Akiyama † (Empire of Japan) Shunji Isaki † (Empire of Japan) Kaju Sugiura (Empire of Japan) Matsuji Ijuin; I.J. Army: (Empire of Japan) Hitoshi Imamura (Empire of Japan) Minoru Sasaki

Strength
~ 43,000	10,500

Casualties and losses
1,195 killed, 3,873 wounded, 93 aircraft destroyed	1,671 killed, 358 aircraft destroyed

The New Georgia campaign was a series of land and naval battles of the Pacific Theater of World War II between Allied forces and the Empire of Japan. It was part of Operation Cartwheel, the Allied strategy in the South Pacific to isolate the Japanese base around Rabaul. The campaign took place in the New Georgia Islands in the central Solomon Islands and followed the Allied capture of the Russell Islands. The main fighting took place on New Georgia itself, although significant actions also took place around the island chain throughout the campaign.

The campaign began on 30 June 1943, when US troops carried out landings in the Kula Gulf, in the north of New Georgia, and around the Munda area on the western coast. In addition, smaller landings were undertaken at Viru Harbor on the southern coast of the island, Wickham Anchorage on Vangunu, and on Rendova. In the north, several actions were fought around Enogai and Bairoko throughout July, while in the west, the main US objective was the Japanese airfield on Munda Point. Stubborn defense by the Japanese delayed the US advance on Munda and the Japanese mounted a strong counterattack before US force eventually captured Munda Point in early August.

Elsewhere, further actions took place on Arundel Island in August and September after Japanese forces withdrew there after the fighting around Munda Point. A large number of Japanese troops concentrated on Kolombangara late in the campaign but were bypassed by US troops who landed on Vella Lavella in mid-August and were later reinforced by New Zealand troops. The campaign ended on 7 October 1943 when the last Japanese troops were withdrawn from Vella Lavella, finalizing the Allied capture of the islands. The campaign had come at a heavy cost to the Allies, incurring more than 5,000 casualties and using four divisions in a campaign that was originally projected to require only one.

A series of naval actions also took place in conjunction with the fighting on land, including actions in the Kula Gulf, off Kolombangara, in the Vella Gulf, off Horaniu and off Vella Lavella.

== Background ==
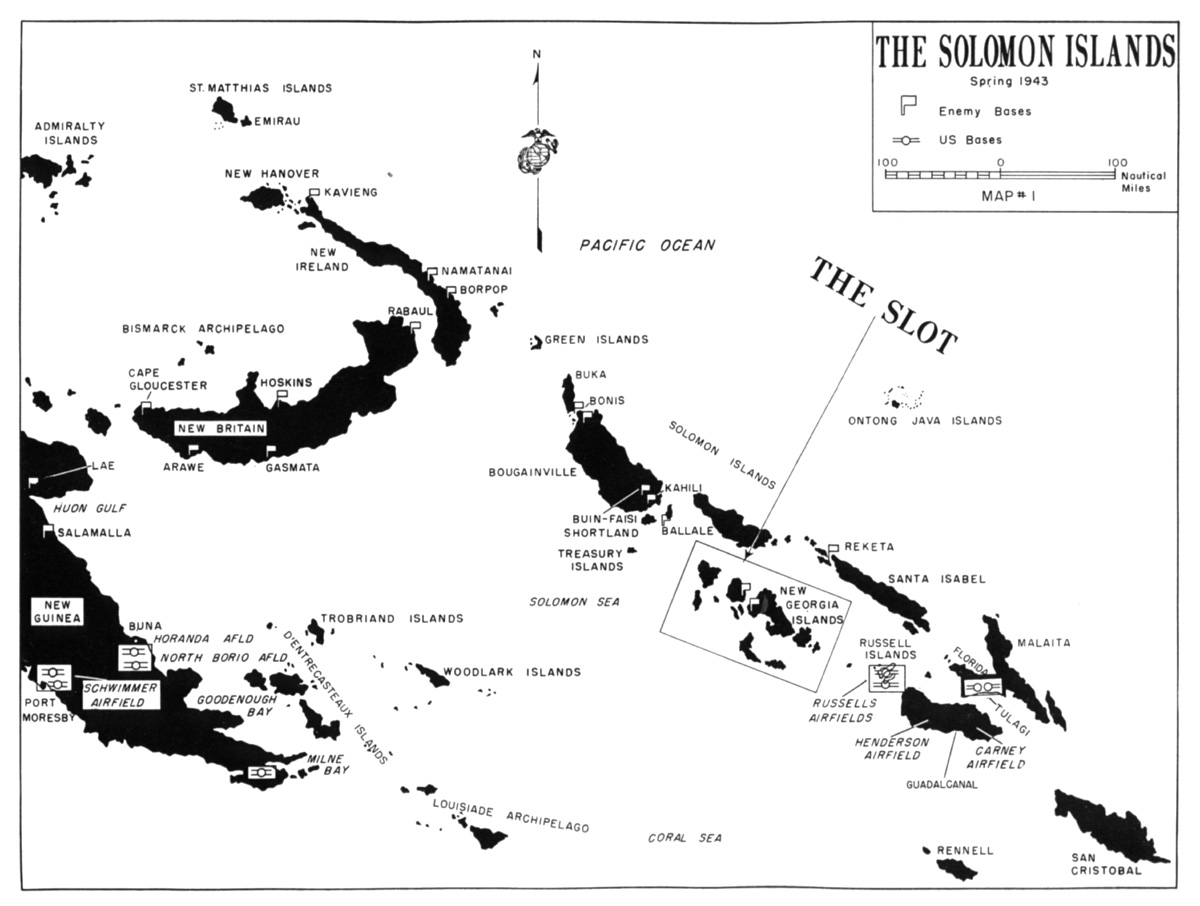
Map showing the area in which Operation Cartwheel took place, with New Guinea in the west and the New Georgias highlighted

The Japanese had captured New Georgia in 1942 and built an airbase at Munda Point which began operations in December 1942 to support the Guadalcanal offensives. As it became clear at the end of 1942 that they could not hold Guadalcanal, the Japanese commanders guessed that the Allies would move toward the Japanese base at Rabaul on New Britain, and that the central Solomon Islands were logical steps on the way.

The Imperial Japanese Army (IJA) believed that holding the Solomon Islands would be ultimately unsuccessful and that it would be better to wait for an Allied attack on Bougainville which would be much less costly to supply and reinforce. The Imperial Japanese Navy (IJN) preferred to delay the Allied advance for as long as possible by maintaining a distant line of defense. With no effective central command, the two Japanese services implemented their own plans: the navy assumed responsibility for the defense of the central Solomons and the army for the northern Solomons.

In early 1943, Japanese defenses were prepared against possible Allied landings on New Georgia, Kolombangara and Santa Isabel. By June 1943, there were 10,500 troops on New Georgia and 9,000 on Kolombangara, all under the command of General Minoru (Noboru) Sasaki, well dug in and waiting for an Allied attack.

== Allied planning ==
=== Choice of New Georgia ===
By early 1943, some Allied leaders had wanted to focus on capturing Rabaul, but Japanese strength there and lack of landing craft meant that such an operation was not practical in 1943. Instead, on the initiative of the US Joint Chiefs of Staff and the South West Pacific Area's staff, including General Douglas MacArthur, a plan known as Operation Cartwheel was developed, which proposed to envelop and cut off Rabaul without capturing it, by simultaneous offensives in the Territory of New Guinea and northward through the Solomon Islands.

The Allied base at Guadalcanal continued to suffer from Japanese bombing raids even after the island was declared secured on 9 February 1943. The Japanese airfield at Munda made these raids easier by giving Japanese planes a convenient place to refuel on the way to and from their main base at Rabaul. The Allies attempted to neutralize Munda with repeated bombing raids and naval shelling, but the Japanese were always able to repair the airfield in short order. The Allied command thus determined that Munda had to be captured by ground troops. Since the New Georgia Islands lay within the South West Pacific Area, which was any area of the Solomon Islands west of longitude 159° east, the operation would be the responsibility of MacArthur and would be conducted by Admiral William F. Halsey's forces. Halsey's operations east of longitude 159° east reported to Admiral Chester Nimitz. US forces committed to capturing Munda totaled 32,000 Army personnel and 1,700 Marines. Forces allocated to capturing Vella Lavella totaled 9,588, of which 5,888 were US servicemen and 3,700 were New Zealanders.

=== Capture of the Russells ===
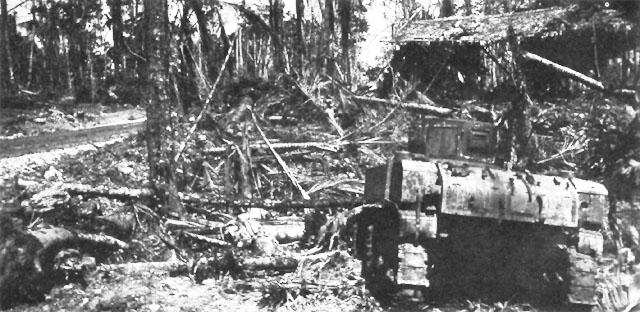
Knocked out Marine Tank during the drive on Munda Point

The Russell Islands, lying between Guadalcanal and the New Georgia Islands, had served as a troop staging base for the Japanese during the fight for Guadalcanal, and Halsey determined to capture it in preparation for the main action in the New Georgias. In early February, he instructed Rear Admiral Richmond K. Turner, Commander Amphibious Force, to undertake Operation Cleanslate.

Beginning 21 February, Turner landed the US Army 43rd Infantry Division under Major General John H. Hester and the 3rd Marine Raider Battalion under Lieutenant Colonel Harry B. Liversedge on the Russell Islands, a total of approximately 9,000 troops and their equipment. These landings were unopposed because, unbeknownst to the Allies, the Japanese had evacuated the Russells soon after leaving Guadalcanal. In fact, the men landing on nearby Banika Island were greeted by two coastwatchers with the offer of a cup of tea.

=== Preliminaries to the New Georgia landings ===
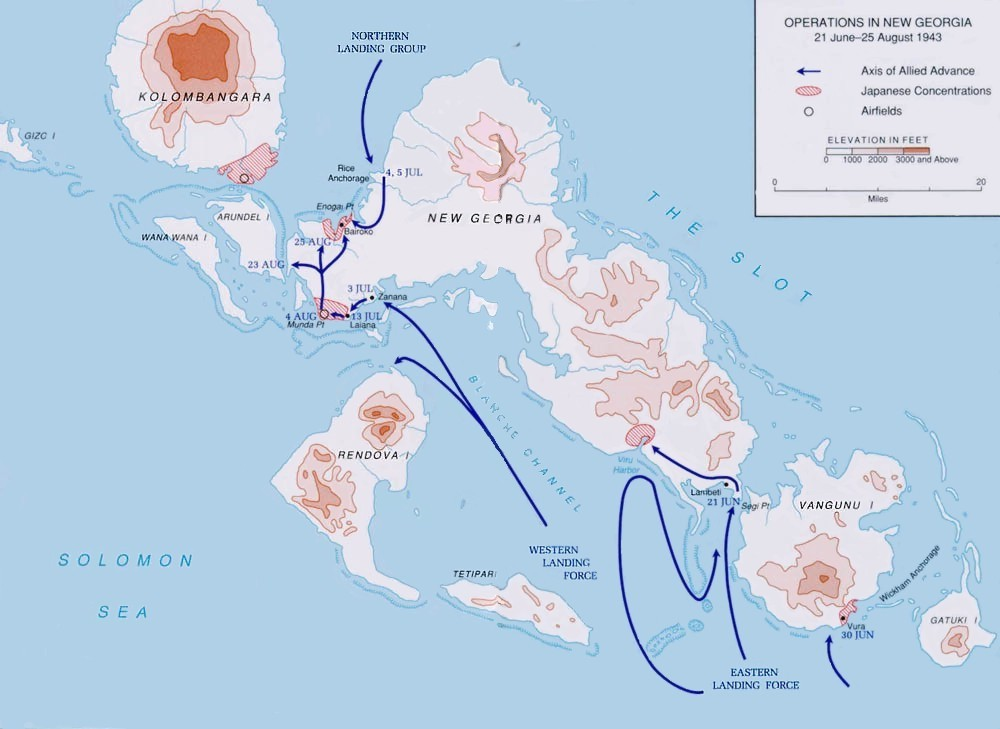
Allied landings in the New Georgias

Alarmed that the Allies were working their way up the Solomons chain, the Japanese bombed the new American base in the Russells and began strengthening their own airfields at Munda and at nearby Vila on Kolombangara. In turn, the Americans attempted to subdue Munda field with naval gunfire with limited success. During the course of one of these overnight bombardment sorties, on the night of 6–7 March 1943, an American force consisting of three light cruisers and three destroyers under the command of Rear Admiral A. Stanton Merrill encountered two Japanese destroyers as they were returning to the Kula Gulf from delivering food and supplies to the garrison at Vila. In the ensuing action, known as the Battle of Blackett Strait, both Japanese destroyers were sunk.

The Americans next attempted to interdict the Japanese supply lanes by mining the ocean approaches to Vila and Munda. This proved as ineffective as bombardment had been, since the Japanese were able to sweep up the mines readily.

The Allies had plenty of time to plan Operation Toenails, as the invasion of the New Georgias was called. The plan called for simultaneous landings on 30 June at four places. From southeast to northwest, these were: (1) Wickham Anchorage on the southeast coast of Vangunu; (2) Segi Point on the southeastern tip of New Georgia; (3) Viru Harbor on the southwest coast of New Georgia, just a few miles up from Segi; and (4) Rendova Harbor on Rendova Island just across Blanche Channel from Munda, placing the Japanese base well within range of land-based artillery.

During the entire New Georgia campaign, the resolution and resourcefulness of the British Commonwealth coastwatchers proved invaluable to the Allied cause. District Officer Donald Gilbert Kennedy, a New Zealander, set the tone in a message he delivered to every native village when occupation by the Japanese was imminent: "These islands are British and they are to remain British. The government is not leaving. Even if the Japanese come, we shall stay with you and in the end they will be driven out." In the event, it was the prospect of Kennedy being killed or captured that led Turner to move up the first Allied landings by nine days. He sent two companies of the 4th Marine Raider Battalion to capture Segi Point on the morning of 21 June, where Kennedy and his native comrades were rescued.

== Conquest of New Georgia island ==
=== Initial landings: 30 June – 2 July ===
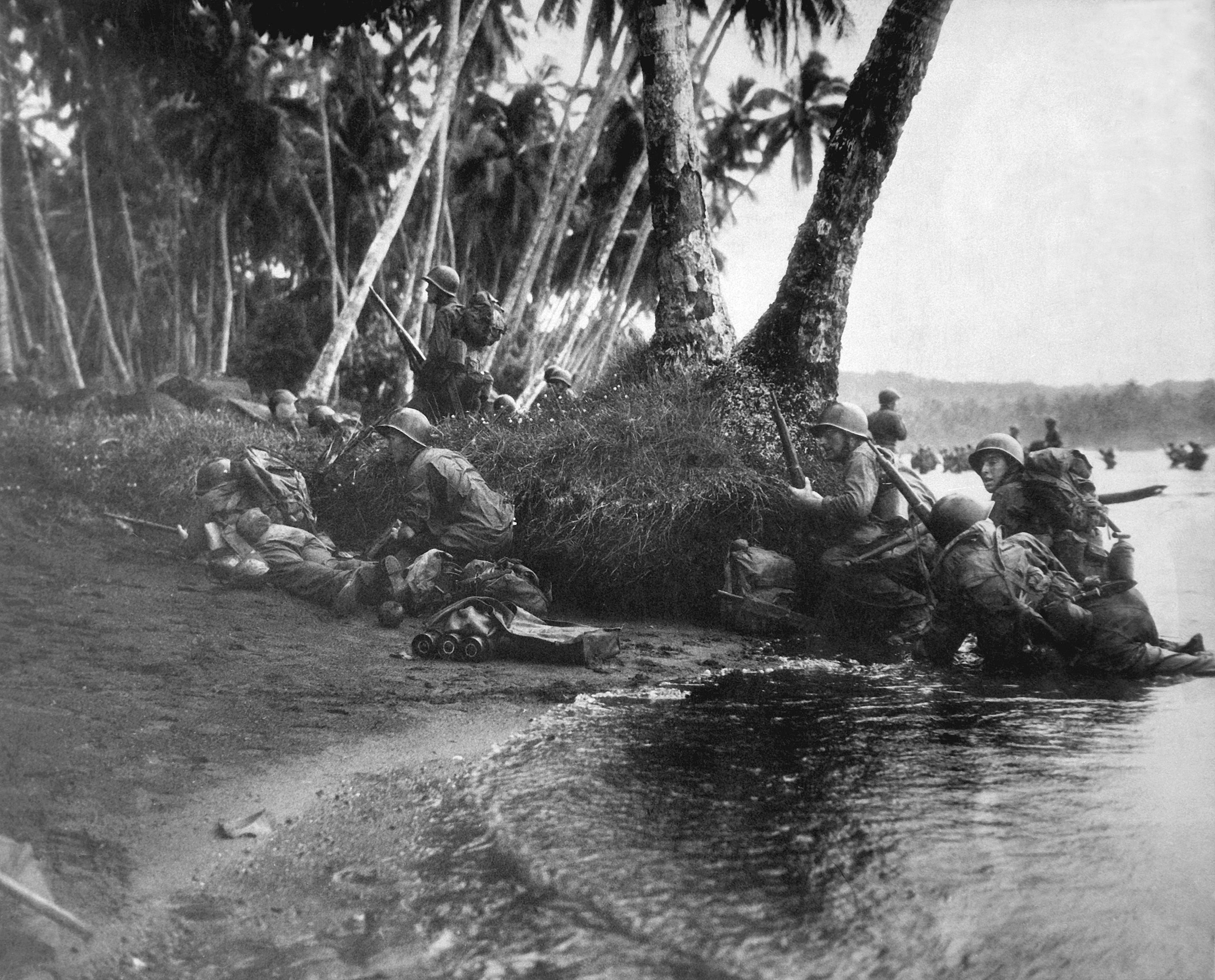
American forces landing on Rendova Island

A force consisting of portions of the 4th Marine Raider Battalion and the 103rd Infantry Regiment landed at Oloana Bay on the south coast of Vangunu Island on 30 June. From there they marched overland to Vura village which overlooked Wickham Anchorage, the first of the objectives of the original Allied plan. By 12 July, Vura was secured and garrisoned. Meanwhile, the remainder of the 4th Marine Raider Battalion captured Viru Harbor, supported by dive bombers, on 30 June, after advancing overland from Lambeti Plantation. They had moved to the plantation by boat on 27 June from Segi Point, having been dispatched there on 21 June during a preliminary operation. Another company from the 103rd Infantry Regiment relieved the Marines in the harbor on 4 July, having landed at Segi Point on 30 June when the Marines' advance had been delayed.

The landings in the Munda area were the most important of the four; the initial phase of this part of the operation was the capture of Rendova, commanded by Admiral Turner. A total of 6,000 soldiers, sailors and marines of the US Army's 172nd Infantry Regiment, the 9th Marine Defense Battalion, and the Navy's 24th NCB landed at Rendova Harbor early on 30 June while Companies A and B of the 169th Infantry Regiment along with the New Zealand-trained and led commando unit of 130 South Pacific islanders took three strategic islets in the Blanche Channel opposite Munda. Rendova, Wickham Anchorage and Viru Harbor were developed into staging areas for the main event, the siege of Munda, while Segi Point was developed into an airfield. The small Japanese garrison on Rendova was quickly overwhelmed but the island was subjected to heavy attack by Japanese aircraft over the following days. The Marines on Rendova quickly built artillery emplacements from which they could shell Munda airfield and support the operations during July and August to capture of Munda airfield.

On 2 July, the Americans were ready to make a landing in the Munda area on the New Georgia mainland. Laiana beach was closest, being only 2 miles (3.2 km) from Munda, but as it was heavily defended, it was rejected in favor of Zanana beach, more than 3 miles (4.8 km) farther east. Zanana would prove to be an unfortunate choice from an Allied perspective. The crossing was undertaken in daylight by elements from two regiments in the afternoon of 2 July; a small perimeter was established around Zanana and defenses built up before the advance westwards towards Munda Point began several days later.

=== Landings in Kula Gulf ===
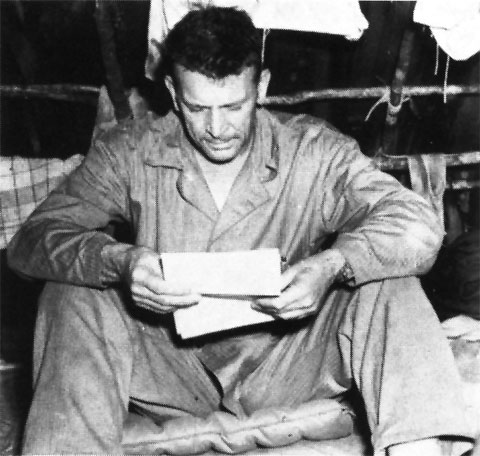
Lieutenant Colonel Harry B. Liversedge on New Georgia.

Vice Admiral Jinichi Kusaka and Lieutenant General Hitoshi Imamura had no intention of allowing New Georgia to fall the way Guadalcanal had. They loaded 4,000 troops on destroyers, brought them down "The Slot" on the night of 4–5 July via the "Tokyo Express," and landed them at Vila on the southeast coast of Kolombangara. From there, the men would be ferried across Kula Gulf on barges to Bairoko on the northwest coast of New Georgia, before moving along eight-mile jungle trail to Munda.

The Allies also carried out an amphibious operation in Kula Gulf that night. Halsey had dispatched transports carrying 4,600 troops consisting of Marine Raiders and two US Army battalions under Colonel Liversedge to Rice Anchorage on the northwest coast of New Georgia. A force of three light cruisers and four destroyers commanded by Rear Admiral Walden L. Ainsworth covered the troopships. One of Ainsworth's destroyers was torpedoed and sunk by the Japanese as the latter were retiring up the gulf from their reinforcement mission to Vila.

Liversedge's men were tasked with moving down the coast and capturing Bairoko, thereby interdicting the trailhead used by the Japanese to reinforce Munda. They were successfully landed at dawn but found the terrain difficult and advanced slowly inland over the course of several days.

The night (5–6 July) after the Kula Gulf landings, the opposing naval forces engaged in a full-scale battle in the waters northeast of Kolombangara, an action that came to be called the Battle of Kula Gulf. The Americans lost a light cruiser while the Japanese lost two destroyers. In the north, after advancing from Rice Anchorage, US forces occupied Triri on 7–8 July. A 400-strong Japanese force launched a counterattack on 8 July against Triri, which initially made some gains before it was checked by a flanking move. Following this, US troops captured Enogai at the mouth of the inlet on 10–11 July, before moving to establish a block along the Munda–Bairoko trail.

=== Advance from Zanana and capture of Munda ===
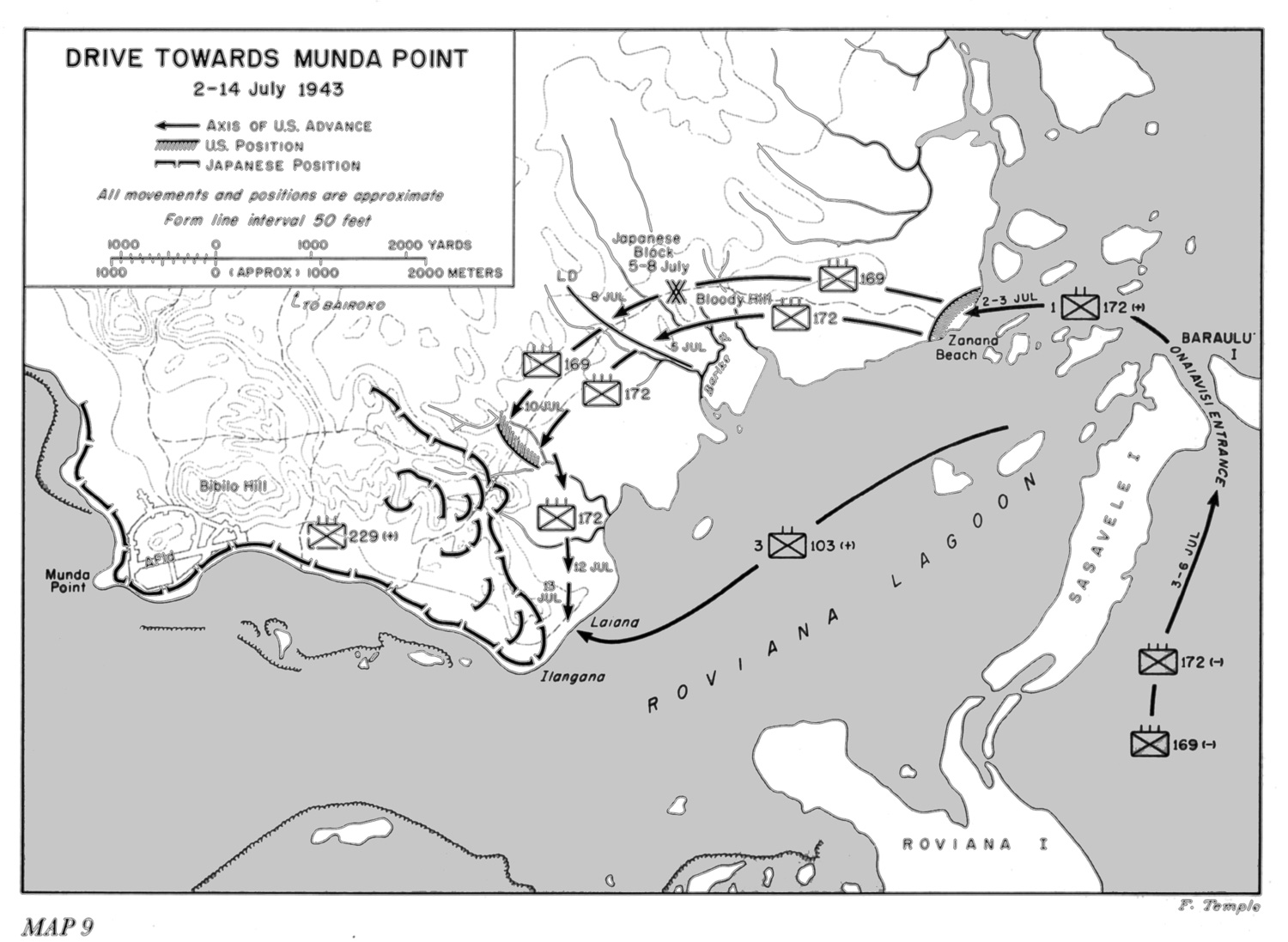
Initial drive towards Munda

The US advance from Zanana to Munda was completely stymied, hampered by difficult terrain, supply problems and low morale. General Hester tried to break the stalemate by sending the 172nd Infantry Regiment around to the north to take the Japanese position in the rear, while the 169th Infantry Regiment continued the frontal assault, but this effort was checked by Sasaki. As a result, the US advance on New Georgia stalled in both the north and the south. The Japanese brought reinforcements by barge from Vila to Bairoko, and 1,200 more troops were loaded onto four destroyer-transports at Rabaul and sent down to be landed at Vila on the night of 12–13 July. These ships were escorted by a light cruiser and five destroyers. Ainsworth was sent to intercept this flotilla with three light cruisers and ten destroyers. He encountered the Japanese force in The Slot in the waters north of Kolombangara, and in the ensuing Battle of Kolombangara one US destroyer and one Japanese light cruiser were sunk.

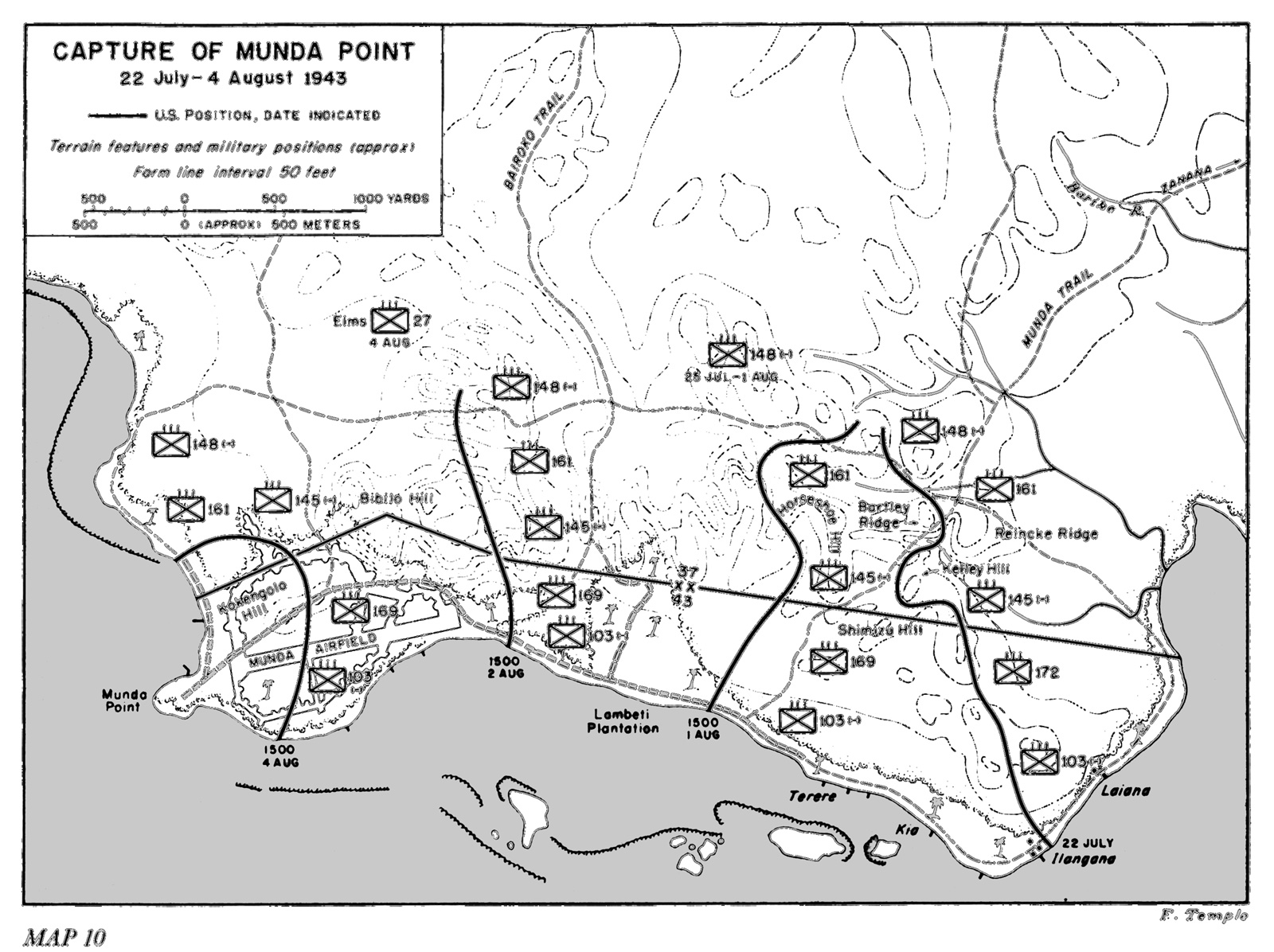
Siege and capture of Munda

Major General Oscar W. Griswold, commander XIV Corps and General Hester's immediate superior, visited New Georgia in mid-July and assessed the situation as dire. He radioed Halsey at Nouméa that at least another division was needed to break the stalemate. Lieutenant General Millard F. Harmon of the United States Army Air Forces was sent to confirm the situation. After an investigation, Harmon gave field command to Griswold so that Hester could concentrate on leading his own division. At the same time, a long-anticipated change in naval command took place with Rear Admiral Theodore Stark Wilkinson taking over leadership of the amphibious forces from Turner on 15 July.

Sasaki initially took advantage of the disorder on the American side. The Japanese learned to apply close assault tactics against American tanks, rendering armor even less effective in the jungle than usual. Meanwhile, the inexperienced, hungry and fatigued US soldiers' nerves began to fray, and they began to lose their fire discipline. On the night of 17 July, the Japanese launched a strong counterattack and succeeded in overrunning the command post of the 43rd Division near Zanana. Eventually, however, Sasaki's troops became sick and exhausted; also, he had lost communications with Rabaul. US forces, bolstered by the arrival of the 37th Infantry Division, subsequently launched a corps-level offensive under Griswold aimed at capturing Munda Point. Sasaki ordered a retreat from the Munda area on 3 August. Griswold had his men sweep around Munda to the northwest and on 5 August plastered the remaining Japanese with artillery fire. That day, the Americans moved unopposed into Munda, finally achieving the campaign's most important goal.

=== Capture of Bairoko ===
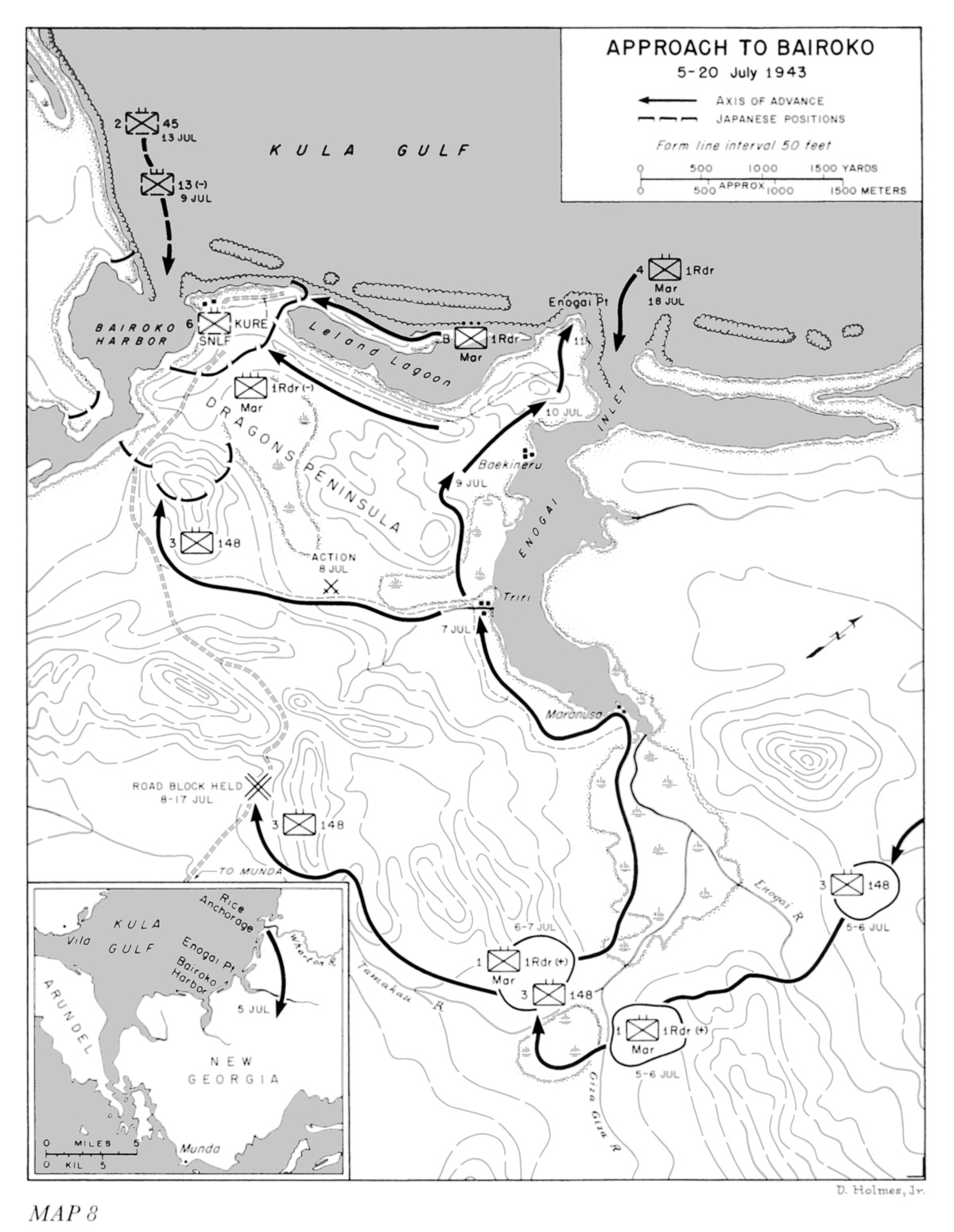
Approach to Bairoko

On the northern front, Liversedge's Marines consolidated their position around Enogai after 12 July and began patrolling the local area while US Army troops occupied the blocking position. This was subsequently abandoned on 17 July, and the soldiers returned to Triri. He had been reinforced by 700 Marines from the 4th Raider Battalion and made plans to capture Bairoko village, on the eastern side of Bairoko Harbor, on 20 July. His Army detachment was to attack the village from the southeast while his Marines converged from the northeast, a classic pincer movement. But the Japanese defensive positions were well designed and had been reinforced since the initial US landing at the Rice Anchorage; as a result, neither force made any progress, and US casualties began to mount. Just before dawn on 22 July, Liversedge called for air strikes to cover his withdrawal. With a view to compensating for failures in land-based air cover following previous such requests, what followed was the heaviest aerial bombardment of the campaign so far.

Beginning 3 August, Liversedge tried again, first establishing a battalion of the 148th Infantry Regiment at a blocking position on the Munda trail. Two days later he relieved these men with a combined Army/Marine force and moved the 148th to a dominant position overlooking the entire area. On 10 August, Liversedge picked up another US battalion and renewed the direct attack on Bairoko. At the same time, two regiments from the 25th Infantry Division, sent to New Georgia as reinforcements, advanced on Bairoko from Munda Point mopping up after the capture of Munda airfield. After two more grueling weeks, the Americans entered Bairoko unopposed on 24 August.

=== Securing New Georgia ===
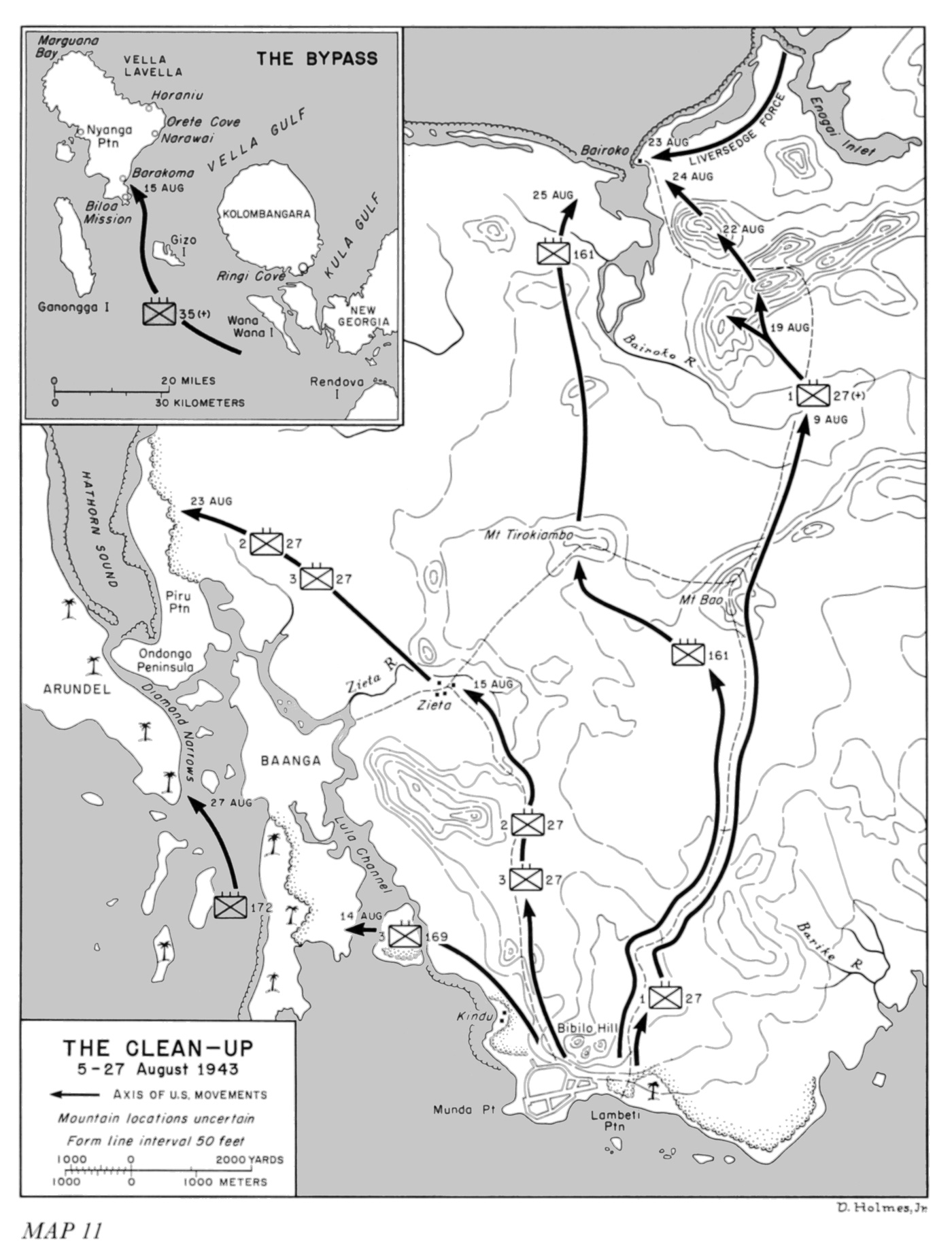
Actions in western New Georgia

Kusaka and Imamura at Rabaul made a final, disastrous attempt to reinforce Sasaki. Under the protection of a single destroyer, 940 troops and 700 naval personnel were loaded aboard three destroyer-transports and sent down under the command of Rear Admiral Kaju Sugiura to Kolombangara on the night of 6–7 August. Wilkinson, anticipating such a movement that night, sent a force of six destroyers under Commander Frederick Moosbrugger to intercept them. In the resulting Battle of Vella Gulf, fought in the waters northwest of Kolombangara, the American destroyers took the Japanese completely by surprise. The three ships carrying passengers were torpedoed and sunk, and the remaining escort ship did not linger to search for survivors.

Following this major reversal, Sasaki moved his headquarters to Kolombangara on 8–9 August, leaving behind a token force to defend the west coast of New Georgia. His mission now was simply to hold the remaining islands of the New Georgia group as long as possible, giving the Japanese a chance to reinforce the northern Solomons. US Army forces moved along the west coast of New Georgia, wiping out the 200 Japanese remaining in the Zieta area. Elements of the 169th and 172nd Infantry Regiments captured Baanga islet on 20–21 August, silencing the Japanese artillery that had been shelling Munda. Despite the proximity of US patrols, the last Japanese troops on New Georgia were moved by barge from Bairoko Harbor over to Kolombangara on the night of 23 August. This marked the end of ground combat on New Georgia.

== Outlying islands ==
=== Arundel ===
Sasaki played his delaying role to the hilt. When the US 172nd Infantry Regiment landed on Arundel Island, just west of New Georgia, on 27 August, he allowed them to come ashore unopposed and establish a beachhead. Just as the Americans were feeling the occupation would be easy, Sasaki counterattacked in multiple places, tying the Americans down and forcing them to call for reinforcements. He carried out a particularly determined attack on 15 September, bringing the whole Allied effort on Arundel to a halt, and with far fewer troops than his opponents. Griswold ordered a full-scale effort, including Marine Corps tanks, to drive the Japanese off the island. After vicious fighting on 17 and 18 September, the Japanese abandoned Arundel for good on the night of 20–21 September.

=== Vella Lavella ===
Halsey had earlier seen the wisdom of bypassing the heavily fortified island of Kolombangara and invading Vella Lavella instead, since Vella Lavella lay closer to Bougainville and Rabaul and was less well defended. Thus, a month before New Georgia was secured by the Allies, they landed a reconnaissance party on Vella Lavella to gain information about Japanese strength and dispositions as well as about suitable landing sites, before returning to Guadalcanal on 31 July. The village of Barakoma near the island's southeastern tip was selected as the landing place. A large invasion force of about 6,500 troops led by Major General Robert B. McClure, escorted by 12 destroyers under the command of Wilkinson was dispatched from Guadalcanal early on 14 August. That night, Japanese planes attacked multiple Allied bases but completely missed this fleet headed for Vella Lavella. The next morning, disembarkation began at Barakoma.

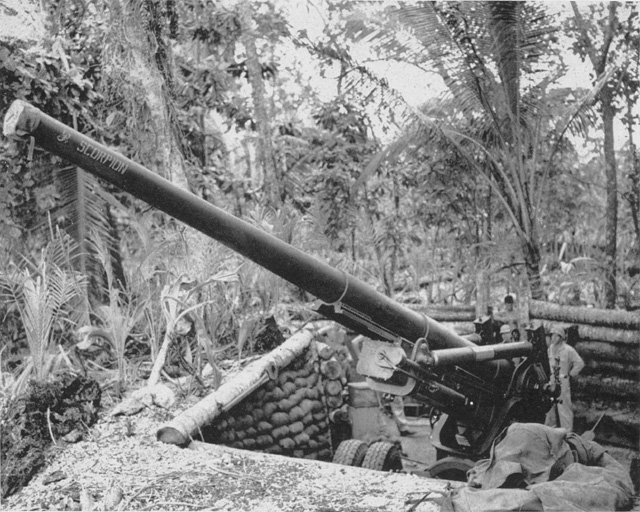
155 mm gun at Barakoma

The Japanese high command in Tokyo had already decided that no more troops would be wasted in the central Solomons. Rather than reinforce and defend Vella Lavella, it was to be used merely as a way station for the evacuation of the troops on Kolombangara that had been bypassed by the Allies with this new landing. Horaniu, on the northeast coast, was selected as a barge staging point and on the night of 17–18 August a small force of ground and naval troops was sent to secure the area. The Japanese destroyer covering force was met in The Slot by four US destroyers under Captain Thomas J. Ryan and subsequently fought an inconclusive action off Horaniu. No ships of either side were lost, and the Japanese succeeded in establishing a barge base.

Meanwhile, throughout August, the Allies pushed the remaining Japanese ground forces on Vella Lavella into a pocket in the northwest corner of the island. The 3rd New Zealand Division, under the command of Major General Harold E. Barrowclough, was tasked with destroying this pocket. The New Zealanders began their pincer movement on 21 September, but the Japanese resisted so fiercely that it took until 5–6 October to bottle them up. On the night of 6–7 October, Rear Admiral Ijuin Matsuji led a naval force to take the 600 remaining ground troops off Vella Lavella. In response, a force of US destroyers was dispatched to intercept them. Each side lost a ship in the ensuing naval battle, but the Japanese were able to successfully complete their evacuation. As a result, Barrowclough's men entered the evacuated area unopposed, concluding the New Georgia campaign.

=== Kolombangara ===
Kolombangara was evacuated by the Japanese between 28 September and 4 October after the U.S. forces completely ignored and bypassed it. The Japanese had stationed a large number of troops on the island and had heavily fortified it in expectation of mounting a stubborn defense, but MacArthur and Halsey's strategic plan was to only take lightly guarded beaches and islands and simply ignore the heavily defended islands.

== Aftermath ==
Casualties during the campaign amounted to 1,195 US servicemen killed and 93 aircraft destroyed, while the Japanese lost 1,671 killed, and 358 aircraft destroyed. In addition, a total of 3,873 US troops were wounded. Casualties from disease were numerous, as were psychological casualties, with over 2,500 troops being diagnosed with "war neurosis" between 30 June and 30 September. The next stage of the Allied advance through the Solomons saw them land at Cape Torokina as part of efforts to secure Bougainville beginning in November; this campaign would last until the end of the war with Australian troops relieving US troops in late 1944. This was preceded by diversionary actions in the Treasury Islands by elements of the New Zealand 3rd Division and by US Marines on Choiseul. Elsewhere, in New Guinea, commencing in late September, the Allies launched campaigns in the Markham Valley and on the Huon Peninsula as part of efforts to secure Lae and Finschhafen. In analyzing the campaign, historian Samuel Eliot Morison describes it as "the most unintelligently waged land campaign of the Pacific war (with the possible exception of Okinawa)", and highlighted the decision to land at Zanana during operations to secure Munda as a mistake, suggesting that Laiana should have been chosen instead. Morison further criticizes the failed flanking move undertaken by Hester's troops to break the deadlock during the initial drive on Munda, describing it as "perhaps the worst blunder in the [campaign]".
