= Oscar Griswold =

United States Army general

Oscar W. Griswold
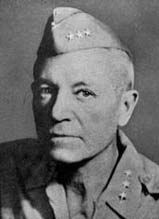
- Born: October 22, 1886; Ruby Valley, Nevada, United States
- Died: September 28, 1959 (aged 72); Colorado Springs, Colorado, United States
- Military career
- Allegiance: United States
- Branch: United States Army
- Service years: 1910–1947
- Rank: Lieutenant General
- Service number: 0-2883
- Unit: Infantry Branch
- Commands: Third Army; Seventh Army; II Corps; XIV Corps; IV Corps; 4th Infantry Division
- Conflicts: World War I; Meuse–Argonne offensive; World War II; Operation Cartwheel; Solomon Islands campaign; Bougainville campaign; Philippines campaign; Battle of Manila
- Awards: Army Distinguished Service Medal (2); Navy Distinguished Service Medal; Silver Star (2); Legion of Merit; Bronze Star Medal; Purple Heart

Lieutenant General Oscar Woolverton Griswold (22 October 1886 – 28 September 1959) was a United States Army officer who served in the first half of the 20th century. He is best known for his command of the XIV Corps in the South Pacific Area and South West Pacific Area during World War II.

== Early life ==
Oscar Woolverton Griswold was born on 22 October 1886 in Ruby Valley, Nevada, son of William Griswold, a prominent Elko County rancher. Raised in Arthur, Nevada, he attended the University of Nevada, Reno from 1905 to 1906, when he received an appointment to the United States Military Academy (USMA) at West Point, New York. On graduation with the West Point Class of 1910, where he graduated 72 in a class of 83, he was commissioned a second lieutenant in the Infantry.

== Military career ==
Griswold's early company grade assignments included three years service in China from 1914 to 1917. During World War I, he served as a major and lieutenant colonel in the 84th Division, American Expeditionary Forces (AEF), from 1918 to 1919, and participated in the Meuse–Argonne offensive.

Griswold was assigned to the USMA from 1921 to 1924. He graduated from the United States Army Command and General Staff College in 1925, graduating 189th in the class of 258, and the United States Army War College in 1929. From 1929 to 1931 Griswold served with the War Department General Staff. This duty was followed by service with the United States Army Air Corps. He served as a member of the Infantry Board from 1932 to 1936, and from 1936 to 1939 was assigned to the Office, Chief of Infantry.

=== World War II ===
Griswold commanded the 29th Infantry Regiment from September 1939 to October 1940. The 29th was the primary training regiment permanently billeted at the Infantry School at Fort Benning, Georgia; under Griswold's command, the first Parachute Test Platoon was organized out of the 29th, as well as its ersatz successor, the original 501st Parachute Battalion. Griswold was promoted to brigadier general in October 1940 and became Commanding General of the Infantry Replacement Training Center at Camp Croft. Promoted to major general in August 1941, he commanded 4th Infantry Division.

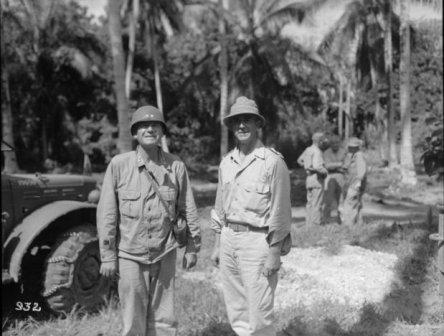
New Zealand Major General Harold Barrowclough (right), with Major General Oscar Griswold, commander of U. S. XIV Corps, Vella Lavella, 1943.

From April 1943, Griswold was Commanding General of the XIV Corps, which fought in New Georgia, Bougainville and in the Philippines. It was for his service during this period that he was awarded the Navy Distinguished Service Medal.

He was promoted to lieutenant general in early 1945, and continued to serve in the Pacific theater under Douglas MacArthur during the Battle of Manila in February 1945. Griswold was the top ground commander only under MacArthur and Krueger during that battle, which was the largest urban warfare American troops ever participated in up to that point; Griswold's XIV Corps, in their bitter and bloody fight for Manila, consisted of the 1st Cavalry Division, the 37th Infantry Division, and the 11th Airborne Division. In June 1945, General of the Army MacArthur nominated Griswold to command the Tenth United States Army following the death of Lieutenant General Simon Bolivar Buckner, Jr. in the Battle of Okinawa. However, he was passed over in favor of General Joseph Stilwell.

== Later life ==
After World War II, Griswold served as Commanding General of the Seventh United States Army from 11 June 1946 to 15 March 1947, and then the Third United States Army from 15 March to 14 April 1947.

In October 1947, Griswold retired to The Broadmoor resort in Colorado Springs, Colorado, and resided in the Broadmoor Stadium Apartments. In 1948, he was employed by The Broadmoor Hotel Corporation as the Director of Athletic Events. These included ice hockey and figure skating in the Broadmoor Ice Palace. In 1954, Griswold helped to bring the new United States Air Force Academy to Colorado Springs. He also appeared in a television segment of This Is Your Life in December 1956 where he lauded the exploits of an army captain who refused to surrender in the Philippines and successfully led a guerilla campaign against the Japanese until he turned himself in to General Griswold. He remained employed by the Broadmoor until health problems caused him to retire.

Griswold died on 28 September 1959 at his home in Colorado Springs. He was buried along with his wife Elizabeth Katherine (Matile) Griswold at the West Point Cemetery.

== Awards ==
Griswold's awards and decorations include the following:

Army Distinguished Service Medal with one oak leaf cluster
Navy Distinguished Service Medal
Silver Star with one oak leaf clusters
Legion of Merit
Bronze Star Medal
Air Medal
Purple Heart
Victory Medal
American Defense Service Medal
Asiatic-Pacific Campaign Medal with two campaign stars
World War II Victory Medal
Army of Occupation Medal

In 1946 he received a Doctor of Laws from the University of Nevada, Reno.

== Dates of rank ==
Insignia	Rank	Component	Date
No insignia	Cadet	USMA	June 15, 1906
No insignia in 1910	Second Lieutenant	Regular Army	June 15, 1910
	First Lieutenant	Regular Army	July 1, 1916
	Captain	Regular Army	May 15, 1917
	Major	National Army	June 7, 1918
	Lieutenant Colonel	National Army	October 1, 1918
	Major	Regular Army	July 1, 1920
	Lieutenant Colonel	Regular Army	March 1, 1935
	Colonel	Regular Army	July 1, 1939
	Brigadier General	Army of the United States	October 1, 1940
	Major General	Army of the United States	August 5, 1941
	Brigadier General	Regular Army	March 1, 1944
	Lieutenant General	Army of the United States	April 14, 1945
	Major General	Regular Army	December 1, 1946
	Lieutenant General	Retired List	October 31, 1947

== Bibliography ==
- Taaffe, Stephen R. (2013). Marshall and His Generals: U.S. Army Commanders in World War II. Lawrence, Kansas: University Press of Kansas. ISBN 978-0-7006-1942-9. OCLC 840162019.

Military offices
Preceded by Major General Lloyd Fredendall	Commanding General of the 4th Infantry Division (Mechanised); August–October 1941	Succeeded by Major General Fred C. Wallace
Preceded by Major General Alexander Patch	Commanding General of the XIV Corps; 1943–1945	Succeeded by Disbanded
Preceded by Geoffrey Keyes	Commanding General of the Seventh United States Army; 1946–1947	Succeeded by Manton S. Eddy
Preceded by Ernest N. Harmon	Commanding General of the Third United States Army; March–April 1947	Succeeded by Edward H. Brooks
