= Minoru Sasaki =

Japanese general

- 佐々木 登
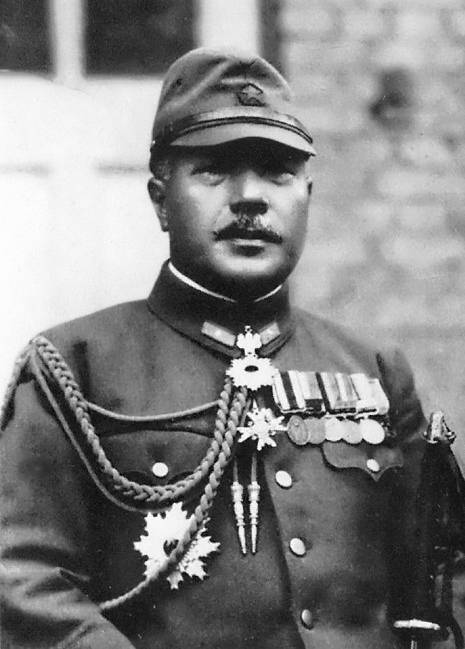
- Born: January 1, 1893; Hiroshima Prefecture, Japan
- Died: April 27, 1961 (aged 68)
- Military career
- Allegiance: Empire of Japan
- Branch: Imperial Japanese Army
- Service years: 1914–1945
- Rank: Lieutenant General
- Commands: 4th Cavalry Brigade, Nanto (Southeast) Detachment
- Conflicts: Second Sino-Japanese War; World War II; Solomon Islands campaign; Battle of New Georgia

Minoru Sasaki (佐々木 登, Sasaki Minoru; 1 January 1893 – 27 April 1961), also known as Noburo Sasaki, was a lieutenant general in the Imperial Japanese Army during World War II.

== Biography ==
Sasaki was born in Hiroshima Prefecture and studied at Shudo Junior and Senior High School. He graduated from the 26th class of Imperial Japanese Army Academy in 1914 and served as a junior officer with the IJA 5th Cavalry Regiment. He graduated from the 35th class of the Army Staff College in 1923, and subsequently served in administrative positions within the Imperial Japanese Army General Staff. He was sent as a military attaché to the Soviet Union and Poland in the 1920s, returning to the General Staff afterwards. He was promoted to colonel in August 1937 and to major general in August 1939, when he was attached to the Army Ordnance Headquarters.

In October 1939, Sasaki became commander of the IJA 4th Cavalry Brigade, which was active in the Second Sino-Japanese War. In December 1940, he became Chief of Staff of the IJA 6th Army. Assigned to Hailar, in Inner Mongolia which was also the site of an extensive Japanese static military fortification system, it was primarily a reserve and training garrison force. He returned to Japan in July 1942 to the staff of the Armored Warfare Department within the Army Ministry, and promoted the development of tanks and armored warfare within the Japanese military.

However, as the war situation continued to deteriorate for the Japanese military in the Solomon Islands, Sasaki was reassigned to command the Southern Detachment in May 1943. He led the Japanese forces during the Battle of New Georgia from June 1943 to August 1943. After fighting an effective, but ultimately unsuccessful delaying campaign, his forces retreated to Kolombangara, only to be bypassed and left to starve, with little chance of reinforcement or resupply. He and his surviving forces managed to successfully escape by barge to Choiseul and Bougainville and then to Rabaul. In the Battle of New Georgia his outnumbered forces stood off nearly four Allied divisions and successfully evacuated 9,400 men to fight again. In the official history of the United States Army, Sasaki was evaluated with uncharacteristic effusiveness that "the obstinate General Sasaki, who disappears from these pages at this point, deserved his country's gratitude for his gallant and able conduct of the defense."

From November 1943, he was on the staff of the IJA 8th Area Army at Rabaul, where he remained to the end of the war. Sasaki was promoted to lieutenant general in October 1944. Sasaki died in 1961.
