= Landings on Rendova =

Allied amphibious landing during the New Georgia campaign of World War II

- Part of the New Georgia campaign of World War II
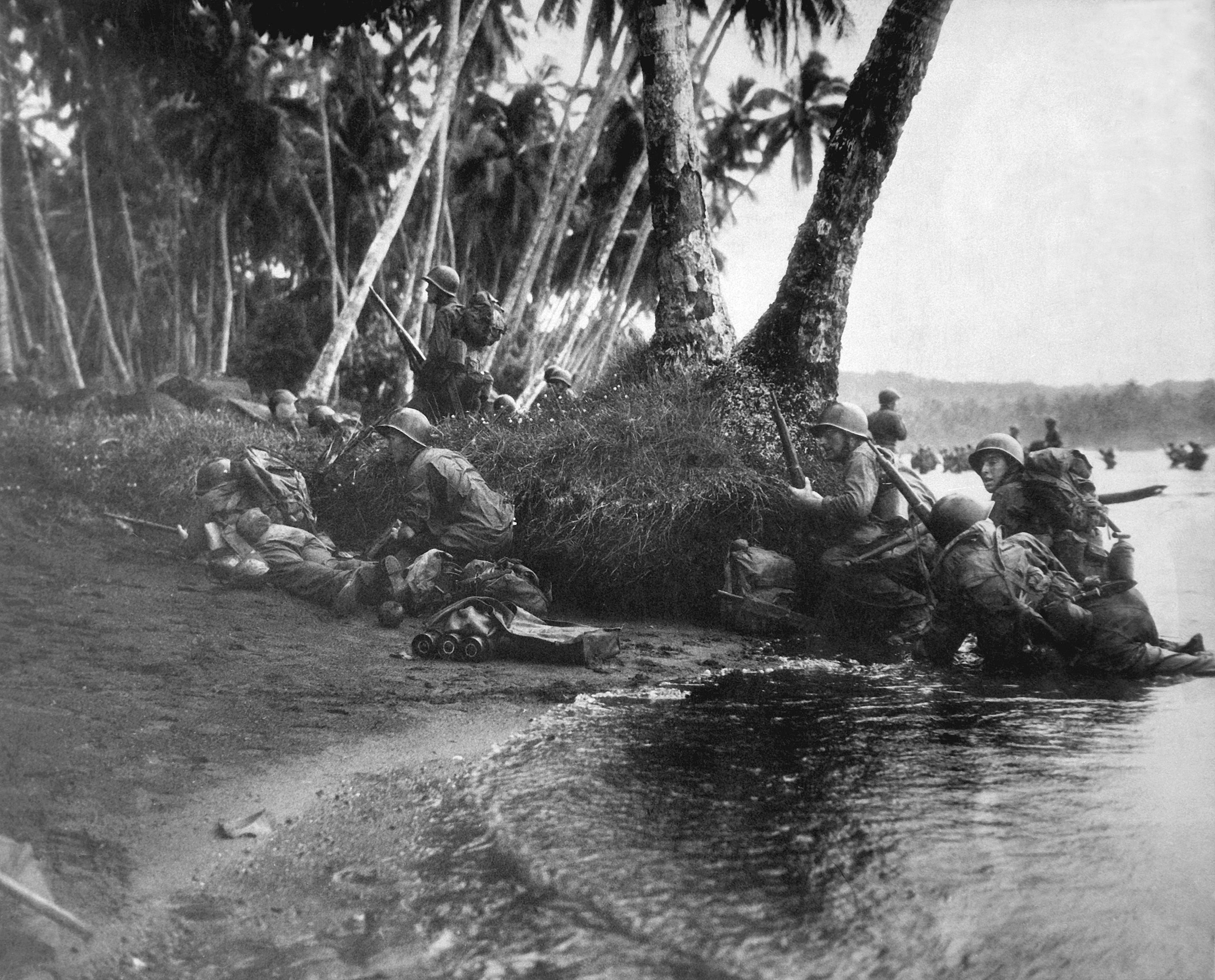
- U.S. Army soldiers come ashore on Rendova Island on 30 June 1943.
Date	30 June 1943 – 4 July 1943 (4 days)
Location	New Georgia, Solomon Islands
Result	Allied victory
Territorial changes	Americans and Pacific Islanders seize Rendova and nearby islands

Belligerents
United States; Solomon Islands; Fiji; New Zealand; Tonga	Japan

Commanders and leaders
(United States) Richmond K. Turner (United States) John H. Hester (United States) Theodore S. Wilkinson (United States) Leonard F. Wing	(Empire of Japan) Minoru Sasaki (Empire of Japan) Genjiro Hirata

Strength
6,000: 43rd Infantry Division; 9th Marine Defense Battalion; 24th NCB; Fiji Guerrillas; Coastwatchers	120 – 290

Casualties and losses
4 killed, 5 wounded during fighting ashore on 30 June; ~ 64 killed on 2 July alone 21 planes lost 1 transport sunk 1 destroyer damaged	50–65 killed 30–106 planes lost

The Landings on Rendova were amphibious military assaults by United States Army, Marine Corps and Navy forces on Rendova Island in the Solomon Islands on 30 June 1943. The small Japanese garrison was quickly overwhelmed by US troops, but the island was subjected to heavy attack by Japanese aircraft over several days. The landings were some of the first Allied landings during the New Georgia campaign of the Pacific War and were successful in securing the island and providing a base from which the Allies could support the subsequent invasion of New Georgia island and the eventual capture of Munda airfield in early August 1943.

The Price of Rendova, a propaganda film released in 1944 by the US Army Signal Corps, details the landings and subsequent Japanese attacks on the Americans.

== Background ==
Rendova Island forms part of the New Georgia group and is situated off the western coast of mainland New Georgia, separated from it by the Blanche Channel. It is roughly rectangular in shape, oriented northeast, with a southwestern tip that extends like the toe of shoe towards Tetepare Island. At the time of the battle, the island's significance lay in its proximity to Munda Point on the western coast of New Georgia, where the Japanese had established an airfield. In the wake of the Guadalcanal campaign, concluded in early 1943, the Allies formulated plans to advance through the Central Solomons towards Bougainville, in conjunction with further operations in New Guinea, as part of the effort to reduce the main Japanese base around Rabaul under the guise of Operation Cartwheel.

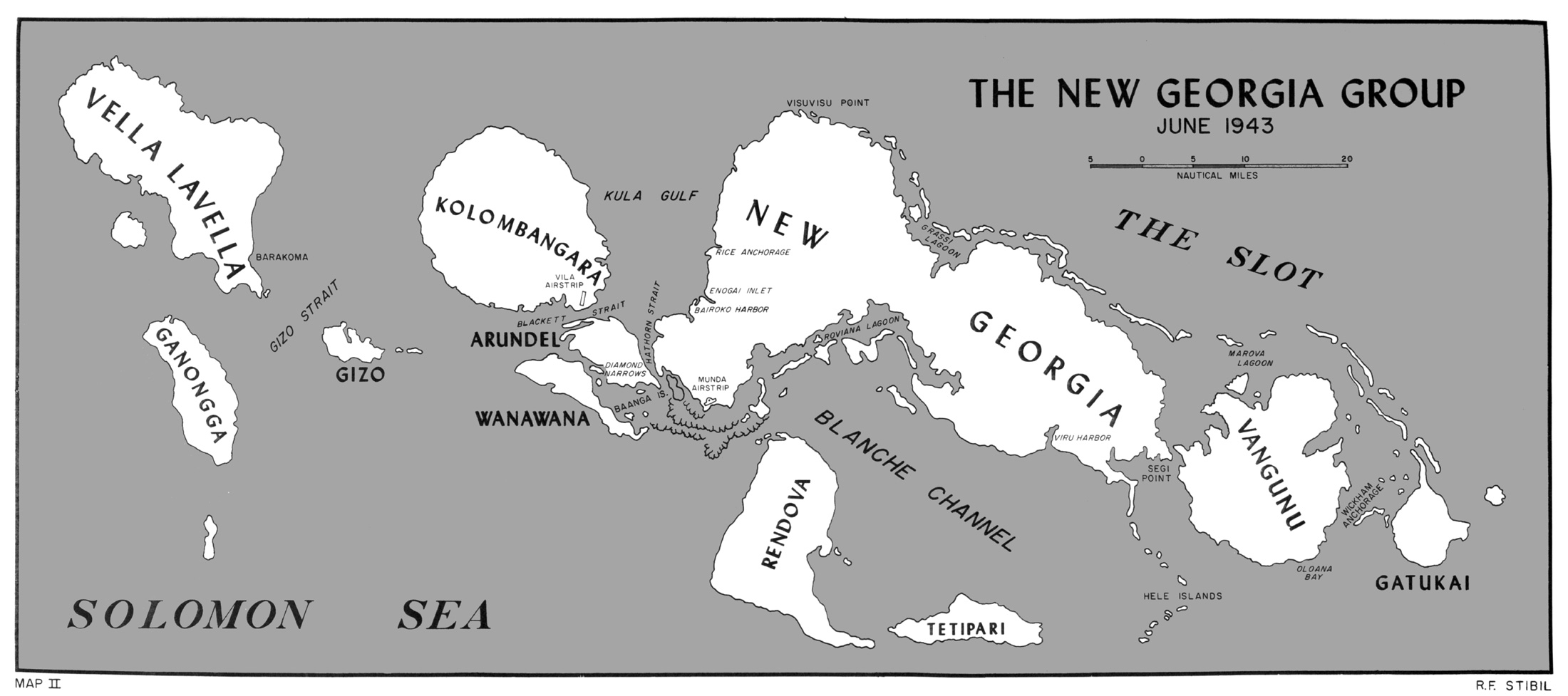
The New Georgia group of islands

The campaign plan for securing New Georgia, designated Operation Toenails by US planners, involved initial landings to secure staging areas and an airfield in the southern part of New Georgia, to support the movement of troops and supplies from Guadalcanal to Rendova, which would be built up as a base for further operations in New Georgia focused on securing the airfield at Munda. Rendova's beaches were well suited to being used as assembly points for landing craft, and the high terrain in the center of the island offered good observation. The harbor would be used to support PT-boat operations against Japanese barges operating in the area and artillery emplaced on the island to support actions on the western coast of New Georgia.

The Japanese garrison on Rendova was small and consisted of between 120 and 290 troops from two companies of the Kure 6th Special Naval Landing Forces and the 229th Infantry Regiment. These two companies formed part of Major General Minoru Sasaki's Southeast Detachment, which was headquartered at Munda; Colonel Genjiro Hirata was in command of the 229th, based on New Georgia. These troops had arrived on New Georgia between February and May 1943 as part of Japanese efforts to reinforce the sector following the Guadalcanal campaign.

== 30 June landings ==
The landings were timed to take place in conjunction with similar operations at Nassau Bay, in New Guinea, and on Woodlark and Kiriwina. After sailing from Guadalcanal on 29 June, the Allied landing force was hampered by rain and fog. The main ground combat element assigned to this force was Major General John H. Hester's 43rd Infantry Division. The task force's approach was covered by Catalinas flying night patrols through the Blanche Channel. In the pre-dawn hours (approximately 02:25) the American destroyers USS Talbot and USS Zane detached from the main force to land New Zealand-trained and led Fijian and Tongan commandos and Companies A and B of the American 169th Infantry Regiment on Sasavele Island and Baraulu Island. The islands were quickly secured, although Zane, became grounded on a reef, remaining so until the afternoon. These islands were strategically important because they are located just off the coast of New Georgia and control the entrance to Roviana Lagoon from the Blanche Channel.

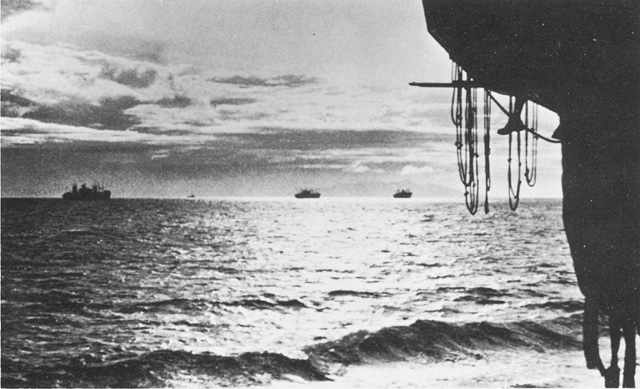
Ships laden with equipment and troops approach Rendova

Admiral Richmond K. Turner commanded the invasion fleet—consisting of four transports and two supply ships, screened by eight destroyers—from his flagship, the attack transport McCawley. A small advanced party of two companies from the 172nd Infantry Regiment was sent ashore around Rendova Harbor guided by a British officer, Major Martin Clemens and Lieutenant Frederick Rhoades, a Royal Australian Navy officer. Along with a small group of local police constables, they intended on linking up with an Australian coastwatcher, Flight Lieutenant Dick Horton, who would assist them in establishing the beachhead prior to the main landing. Strong winds pushed the advanced party off course, and ultimately they did not make contact with Horton until the first wave was making its run to the shore. After arriving at the correct beach, Clemens and Rhoades led their men in a quick attack on a house in Rendova Plantation, killing two Japanese behind the beach.

By 06:00, the 43rd Division had begun landing. The U.S. Marine Corps' official history describes the initial landing as "hurried", "[having] all the appearance of a regatta rather than a coordinated landing" and "chaotic in the extreme"; nevertheless, troops from the 103rd Field Artillery Battalion, along with Marines from the 9th Defense Battalion and Seabees from the 24th Naval Construction Battalion secured the beach although they were hampered by sporadic sniper fire. The appearance of a Japanese "Betty" bomber which circled the landing zone but did not attack also slowed progress. The Japanese defenders reported back to their commanders that "due to the tenacious interference by enemy fighter planes, a decisive blow could not be stuck against the enemy landing convoy" and that the landings were an "absolutely miraculous" and "speedy disembarkation of the enemy."

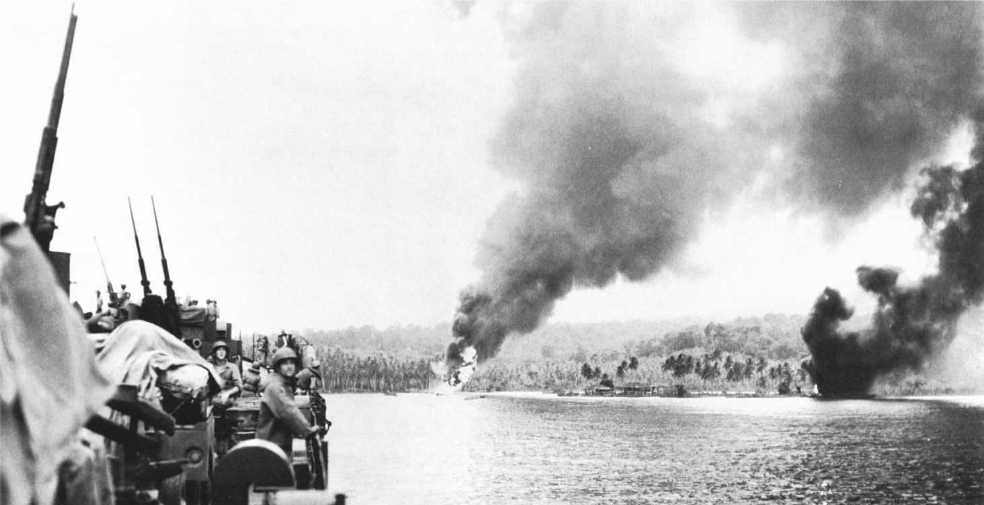
Marines landing at Rendova Harbor on D-Day

Following the first echelon, the 43rd Division's assistant commander, Brigadier General Leonard Wing, and Vice Admiral William F. Halsey, in command of the operation to secure New Georgia, waded ashore under sniper fire after their boat became grounded about 50 yards (46 m) from the beach. The 2nd Battalion, 172nd Infantry Regiment established a defensive perimeter around the beachhead but experienced trouble digging-in because of the swampy ground. Eventually, they were forced to move their defensive lines to higher ground. As the invasion progressed American supplies crowded the beaches as infantry pushed the Japanese defenders inland. The 9th Marine Defense Battalion, in addition to skirmishing with Japanese forces, began securing and clearing their predefined artillery position objectives, and the Seabees from the 24th Naval Construction Battalion began clearing an encampment for a medical aid station. The Seabees' work was hampered by sniper fire, while heavy rain quickly turned the ground to mud which disrupted the movement of vehicles and heavy tractors that were tasked with dragging the heavy artillery pieces into position.

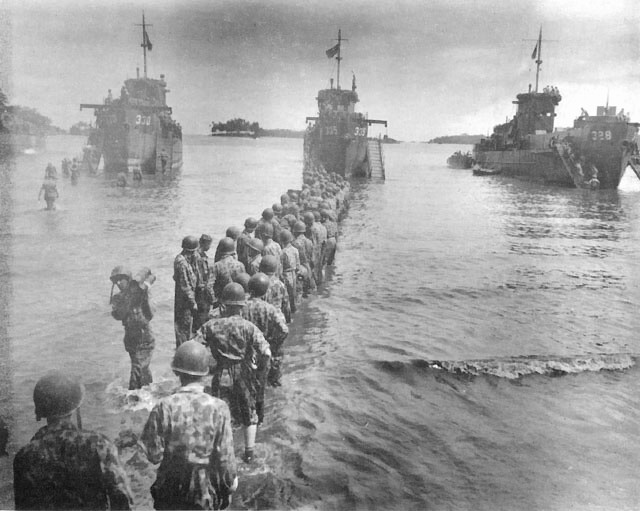
LCIs being unloaded at Rendova

In response to the landing, Japanese artillery batteries based on Bangaa Island and around Munda then began shelling four US destroyers that were sailing through the Blanche Channel offshore from the landing beach. This shelling damaged the destroyer Gwin, killing three and wounding seven, before two other ships from the screen—Farenholt and Buchanan—began engaging the shore batteries, while the damaged Gwin obscured the transports with smoke to prevent them from being engaged. A force of 27 Zeros from the 11th Air Fleet undertook a fighter sweep over the beachhead just before noon, delaying the unloading of the US transports while Allied fighters engaged them, shooting down four.

The assault, although initially chaotic, successfully landed 6,000 American troops on Rendova. These forces came ashore largely unopposed as the island's small garrison was taken by surprise and were unable to man their defenses in time before the US troops arrived. The Japanese initially assembled in a coconut plantation behind the landing beach and sought to establish radio contact with Munda, while undertaking minor skirmishing and laying down harassing fire from machine guns in the nearby plantation. In the initial fighting, about 12 Japanese were killed. They then withdrew into the hinterland. Troops from the 172nd Infantry Regiment pursued the withdrawing Japanese, shooting down several snipers and destroying several machine gun positions as they advanced slowly towards the Pengui River. There, the Americans came under sustained fire, but after gaining fire superiority with mortar support and establishing a firm base along the riverbank, the US troops attacked. By the end of the day between 50 and 65 Japanese had been killed, including the Japanese commander. Four US soldiers were killed and another five wounded including the 172nd Infantry Regiment's commander, Colonel David Ross.

The transports weighed anchor and began to depart the area around 15:00. Half an hour later, Japanese air attacks began in earnest when Admiral Jinichi Kusaka ordered a strike by 25 Betty torpedo bombers, escorted by 24 Zeros. Despite being intercepted by 16 Corsairs from Marine Fighter Squadron 221, and coming under heavy anti-aircraft fire, one of the Bettys was able to release a torpedo which struck McCawley, killing 15 sailors and wounding eight others. While under tow from Libra, the ship again came under attack from Val dive bombers, which formed part of a larger air attack consisting of 21 Zeros, nine Vals and 13 F1M floatplanes. This attack was repulsed with no Allied losses, as the Japanese air attacks on the landing zone were successfully beaten off by American fighter planes as well as land and sea-based anti-aircraft defense guns. Allied aircraft began bombing Japanese positions around Villa and Munda, and by 17:00, 105 mm artillery guns from the 103rd Field Artillery Battalion had been established in the harbor and began registering targets on the mainland.

Air and naval losses on the first day are disputed. The Japanese claimed to have shot down 50 Allied aircraft, although the Allies reported only 21 planes lost. Additionally, the Japanese claimed to have sunk a cruiser and a destroyer, and damaging two more destroyers and eight transports; Allied reported shipping losses amounted to one destroyer damaged and one transport sunk. On the Allied side, they claimed to have shot down 106 Japanese planes, but Japanese figures support only 30 lost.

== Japanese counter-attacks ==
During the night, McCawley, having rendezvoused with the tug Pawnee, was mistakenly sunk by American PT boats, being struck by two torpedoes at 20:23. By this time, Turner had transferred his flag to the destroyer Farenholt. Meanwhile, the same night, a Japanese naval attempt to attack the American beachheads failed when five Japanese destroyers appeared off the west coast of Rendova but could not attack because of a violent squall. After the lightly contested landings, the bulk of the surviving Japanese forces retreated to Munda Point on nearby New Georgia, moving back via canoe. Troops from the 172nd Infantry Regiment expanded the beachhead on 1 July, with patrols securing half the island, while the 3rd Battalion, 103rd Infantry Regiment landed around the Poco Plantation in Landing Craft Infantry vessels.

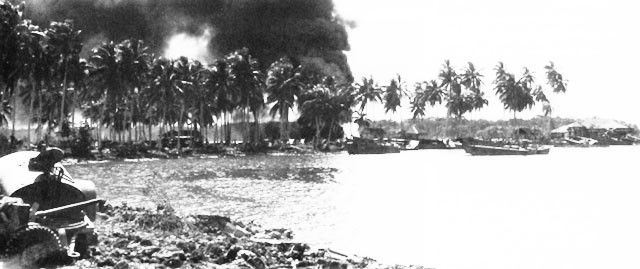
Fires burning on "Suicide Point" after the Japanese air raid on 2 July that caught American forces by surprise and left over 150 Americans dead or injured.

In the harbor, the unloading process had been hampered by poor planning and a failure to allocate adequate personnel for beach control and unloading duties. To clear the beachhead and distribute combat stores, infantrymen were detailed to carry out the work. When the second transport echelon arrived, many of the boats grounded offshore and had to be unloaded manually by troops wading ashore. Heavy rain continued to slow the distribution of stores and movement of heavy equipment. The second echelon also landed heavy artillery from the 192nd Field Artillery Battalion and a battery from the 9th Defense Battalion. With their arrival, the U.S. forces constructed artillery positions on Rendova and were able to bring 155 mm "Long Tom" guns into action, firing shells across the 15 km-wide Blanche Channel onto the Japanese positions at Lambeti plantation and Munda air field. The 192nd established their positions on Kokorana Island where strong coral substratum offered natural hard standing for their heavy guns. Six PT boats under the command of Lieutenant Commander Robert B. Kelly also arrived at Rendova early on 1 July; it was this force that accidentally sunk McCawley during their passage through the Blanche Channel.

On 2 July, the US infantrymen on Rendova commenced preparations to reembark for further operations on New Georgia island. That afternoon, a Japanese aerial counter-attack consisting of 24 Mitsubishi G4M Betty bombers and 44 fighters bombed the American beachhead from the south. American fighter planes had been withdrawn at the time of the attack because of poor weather conditions, and the Japanese planes were unopposed. The bombing was accurate, and the unsuspecting American troops had no time to react. As a result of the attack a gelignite dump exploded on a peninsula, thereafter known as "Suicide Point," killing 64 soldiers and injuring at least 89 more. A few hours after this first raid a follow-up raid was conducted by 25 Japanese fighter aircraft. These were intercepted by American fighter aircraft, and in the ensuing air battle six Japanese planes and three American planes were shot down.

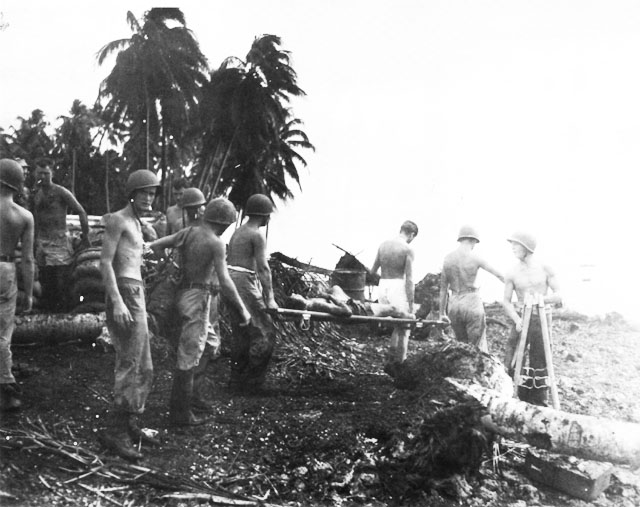
The aftermath of an August air raid on Rendova

During the night of 2–3 July the Japanese cruiser Yūbari and nine destroyers attempted a bombardment of the Rendova beachhead, but bad weather and the small size of the beachhead caused all their shells to fall harmlessly into the surrounding jungle. Meanwhile, that same night, small groups of US infantry were transported in LCMs across the strait to New Georgia's offshore islands in the opening phase of the Drive on Munda Point operation. A Japanese sortie of 35 Mitsubishi Ki-21 bombers and fighter aircraft attempted to attack positions on Rendova on 3 July but were intercepted by American fighter planes who reported downing 11 Japanese aircraft with a loss of 3 Allied aircraft. In the afternoon a large flight of American and New Zealand planes bombed Munda Point and reported causing large amounts of damage.

On 4 July Rendova was reported "secure" by American commanders. Shortly after this, the Japanese launched a heavy air attack on the island. The US garrison had been heavily reinforced with antiaircraft guns and radars, and a strong fighter screen had been established to protect unloading operations in Rendova Harbor. A force of over 80 Japanese aircraft, consisting of 17 bombers and 66 fighter escorts, subsequently attacked the island from the east. At least 11 Japanese aircraft were shot down, although US losses and claims remain uncertain, with the Japanese claiming to have shot down a large number defending fighters and having sunk several transport ships. Ultimately, according to U.S. Marine Corps historian John Rentz, as a result of the heavy antiaircraft fire, the Japanese abandoned large scale air attacks on Rendova, although minor air raids on Rendova continued into August.

== Aftermath ==
The Allied forces fought off continuous Japanese air-raids in the months following the landings. These raids caused human and materiel losses but never seriously threatened the American foothold and bases on the island. As a result, Rendova was successfully used as an artillery base during the subsequent stages of the New Georgia campaign, covering a crossing of the channel to the mainland on 2 July, as US troops from the 169th and 172nd Infantry Regiments landed around Zanana. This landing was then followed by a westward drive on Munda Point and the eventual capture of the airfield during the Battle of Munda Point in early August.

Base development work around Rendova began shortly after the landings, with the 24th Naval Construction Battalion undertaking road construction work, including the creation of corduroy roads to facilitate movement of heavy vehicles and artillery in the muddy conditions. Under the threat of air attack, three bulldozers were destroyed in this effort, and 20 men were killed. The beach was extended using coral fill, while Marston Matting was also laid in an effort to combat the mud, but their weight, coupled with that of the heavy vehicles employed to move the 155 mm artillery pieces resulted in the roads sinking into the mud. The 118th Engineer Combat Battalion attempted to drain the area around the eastern landing beach, but this proved fruitless and the area was ultimately abandoned in favor of some of the barrier islands, which were used as staging areas.

The Seabees were also employed in stevedore work, unloading stores and equipment from the transport ships. The movement of the entire 24th NCB to Rendova was not completed until 1 August, but in the middle of the month it was moved to Munda. After the recapture of Munda Point the artillery was redeployed to Munda and during October 1943, the U. S. Navy's 20th Naval Construction Battalion "Seabees" built a PT boat base, camp area and warehouses on Bau Island. During March 1944, the 73rd Battalion Seabees added an engine warehouse, additional roads and fuel lines to the facility.

A Royal New Zealand Air Force Radar Unit (COL 57) was stationed on Rendova Island and commenced operations in November 1943, under the command of Pilot Officer Leatham.

== Gallery ==
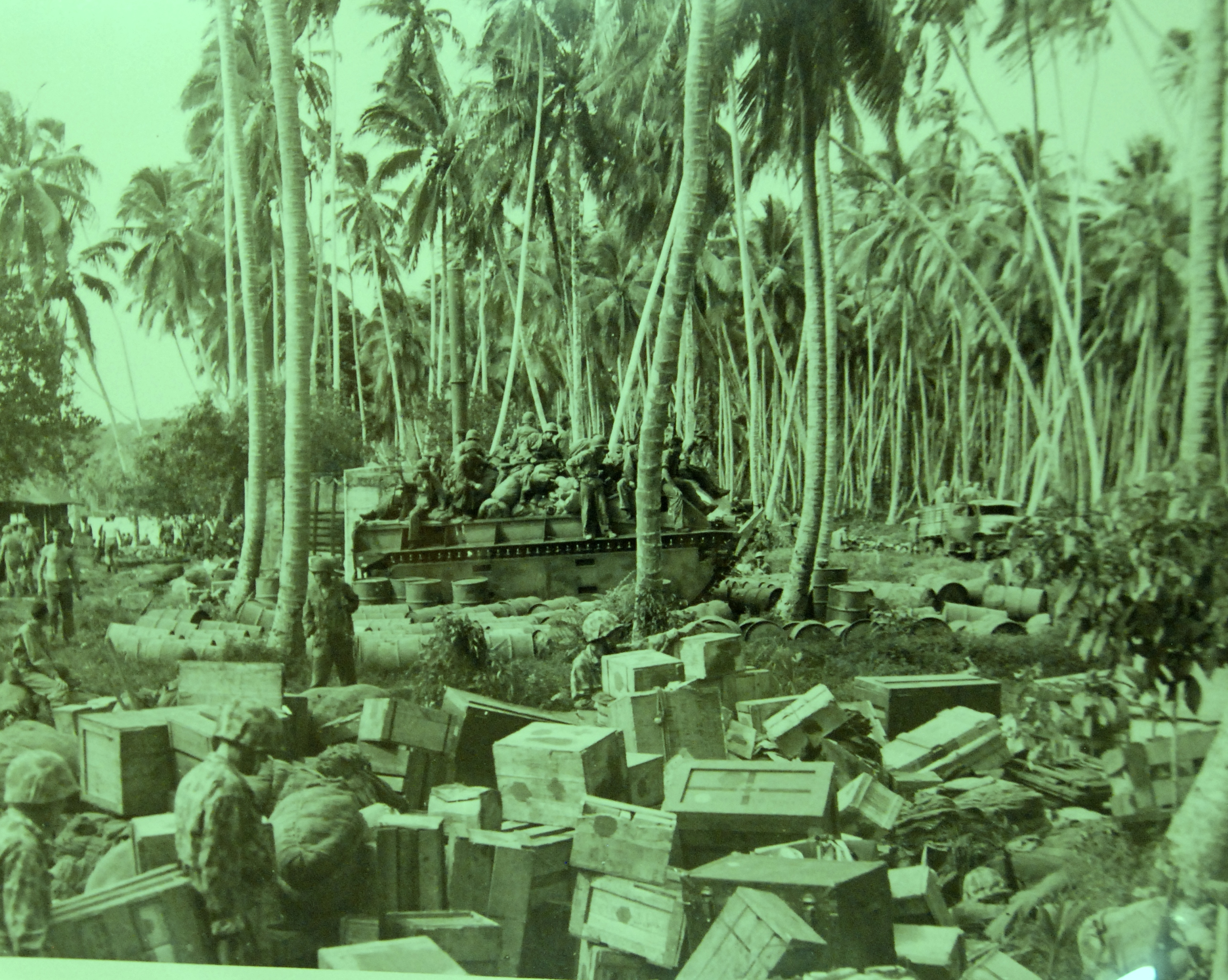
The landing area crowded with supplies immediately following the invasion

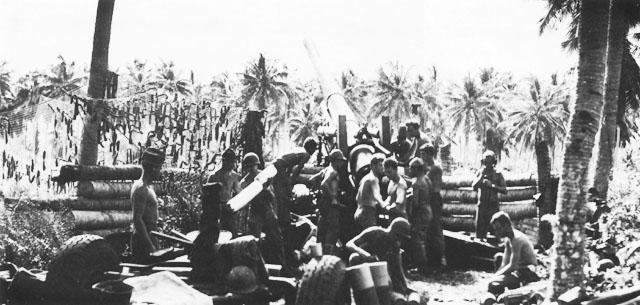
The US Marine crew of the 9th Defense Battalion's 155 mm "Long Tom" artillery fires from Rendova or a nearby island in support of the US Army's offensive on New Georgia, July 1943

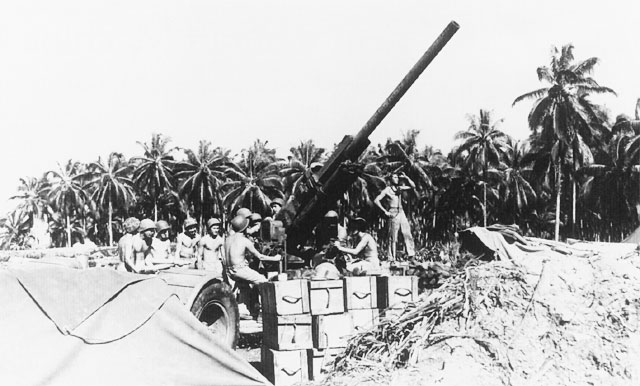
90 mm antiaircraft guns on Rendova

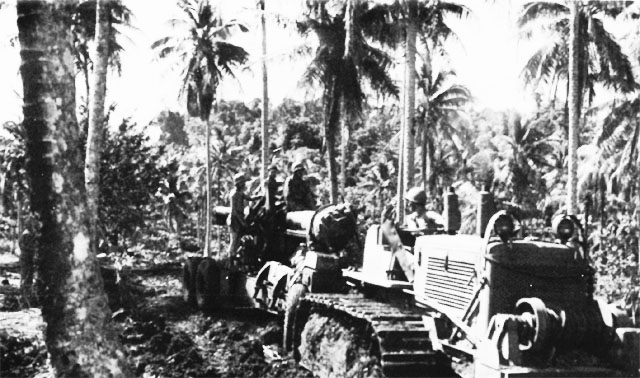
155 mm "Long Tom" artillery being towed on Rendova

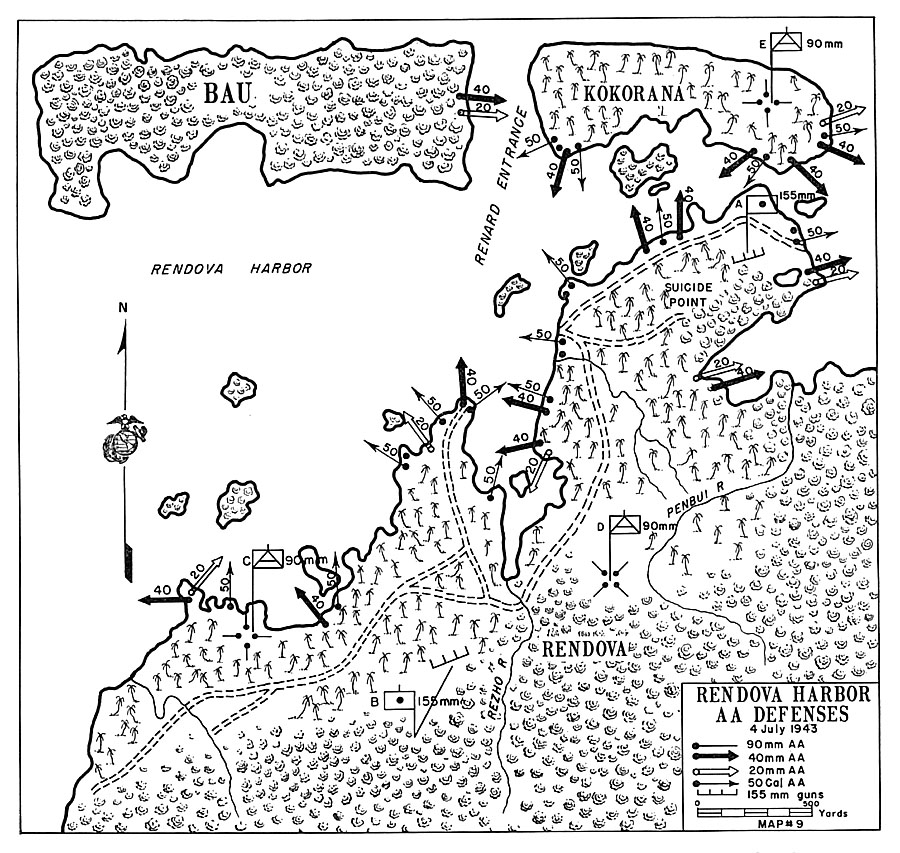
Marine AAA and "Long Tom" artillery positions on Northern Rendova, July 4, 1943
