= Admiral Lyons =

Admiral Lyons may refer to:

- Algernon Lyons (1833–1908), British Royal Navy admiral
- Edmund Lyons, 1st Baron Lyons (1790–1858), British Royal Navy admiral
- James Lyons (admiral) (1927–2018), U.S. Navy admiral

== See also ==
- Richard Lyon (naval officer) (1923–2017), U.S. Navy rear admiral
- George Hamilton D'Oyly Lyon (1883–1947), British Royal Navy admiral
