= Fiji Guerrillas =

- Active: 1942–1944
- Country: Colony of Fiji
- Branch: New Zealand Army
- Type: Commando
- Role: Direct action Raiding; Special operations Reconnaissance; Jungle warfare
- Size: Unknown number of officers, 200+ other ranks
- Engagements: World War II: Pacific War; Solomon Islands campaign; Guadalcanal campaign; Bougainville campaign

The Fiji Guerrillas were a commando battalion consisting of two commando companies, raised by the New Zealand Army for service during World War II. The Fiji Guerrillas consisted of Fijian, Tongan and Solomon Islander servicemen, who served under the command of New Zealander and British Solomon Islands Protectorate Defence Force (BSIPDF) NCOs. The commando companies were tasked with conducting reconnaissance, scouting and special operation activities against Japanese forces as part of the Pacific War.

== History ==
At the commencement of the Second World War, Fiji was a colony of the British Empire, however the defence of the colony was assigned to the New Zealand Army. It became immediately apparent to the New Zealand Army that if an invasion of Fiji was to occur, jungle warfare would be the likely scenario. It was envisioned that units would have to rely on stealth and guerrilla tactics, with historical trench warfare being unlikely to play out. The New Zealand Army thus began to mobilise the local Fijian population to form guerrilla units. The recruits engaged in gruelling training that focused on jungle warfare including ambush, close-quarter and scouting tactics. The Fiji Guerrillas displayed discipline and enthusiasm and a strong bond was forged between the recruits and their New Zealander NCOs.

== Organisation ==
The Fiji Guerrillas were a commando battalion organised into two separate companies, consisting of 1st commando and 2nd commando, also known as the South Pacific Scouts. Despite hailing from Fiji, the Guerrillas also consisted of recruits from Tonga and the Solomon Islands. Fijian recruits almost exclusively came from the Indigenous Fijian population, in part due to Fijian chiefs giving their full support and loyalty to the British Empire. Indo-Fijian recruits were scarce, due to their disinterest in the colonial administration and their refusal to accept pay inferior to European volunteers'.

== Combat ==
In June 1942, the Fiji Guerrillas alongside the entire Fijian Defence Force, fell under the United States (U.S) South West Pacific Area military command. By late 1942, Allied command reluctantly allowed the deployment of 30 Guerrillas from 1st commando to serve as scouts as part of the Guadalcanal campaign, under the command of Major Charlie Tripp of the New Zealand Army. Men of the 1st commando distinguished themselves in battle, which earned them praise from the then Colonel Alexander Patch. Tripp advocated for further deployment of the Fiji Guerrillas, citing their acute eyesight, hearing and ability to carry significant loads of goods. Allied command agreed and further Guerrillas were deployed to the Pacific theater, following a farewell march through Suva on 13 April 1943. Fiji Guerrillas took part in Allied landings on New Georgia, as part of the Drive on Munda Point. Tasked with securing a beachhead at Zanana, 75 Guerrillas and 35 U.S. non-combat troops withstood at attack from 200 soldiers of the Imperial Japanese Army. This action earned high praise from General Robert S. Beightler of the U.S. Army who stated:

The South Pacific Scouts furnished distant reconnaissance patrols which worked well into enemy territory, often at great hazard, and further furnished battle guides in some instances who actually led front line units in assaults on enemy positions.

In December 1943, the Fiji Guerrillas were sent to the Bougainville Island as part of the Bougainville campaign. The Guerrillas, under the command of Lieutenant Len Barrow of the BSIPDF took part in special operations and the construction of an airfield. In May 1944, the Fiji Guerrillas were disbanded.

== Bibliography ==
- Kwai, Anna Annie (2017). Solomon Islanders in World War II: An Indigenous Perspective. Australia: ANU Press. ISBN 978-17-60461-66-9.
- Lowry, Robert (2006). Fortress Fiji: Holding the Line in the Pacific War, 1939-45. Australia: R.W. Lowry. ISBN 0-9775129-0-8.
- Macnaught, Timothy (2016). The Fijian colonial experience: a study of the neotraditional order under British colonial rule prior to World War II. Australia: ANU Press. ISBN 978-19-21934-35-3.
- Newell, Reg (2016). The battle for Vella Lavella: the Allied recapture of Solomon Islands territory, August 15-September 9, 1943. United States of America: McFarland & Company, Inc., Publishers. ISBN 978-14-76619-84-2.
- Rottman, Gordon (2002). World War II Pacific island guide: a geo-military study. United States of America: Greenwood Publishing Group. ISBN 0-313-31395-4.
