= OBP =

OBP may stand for:

- Office of Border Patrol, part of US border control
- Object-based programming
- Odorant-binding protein, olfaction; proteins
- Old Bold Pilots Association
- One Bad Pig, a Christian punk band from Austin, Texas
- On-base percentage, a baseball statistic
- One Bennett Park, a skyscraper under construction in Chicago's Streeterville neighborhood
- One Bayfront Plaza, a proposed skyscraper in Downtown Miami
- OpenBoot, also known as "Open Firmware", the low-level firmware in Sun Microsystems, Inc. machines
- Orange-bellied parrot, a critically endangered bird species from Australia
- Osaka Business Park, a business district in Osaka, Japan
