= Richard Lyon (naval officer) =

American admiral (1923–2017)

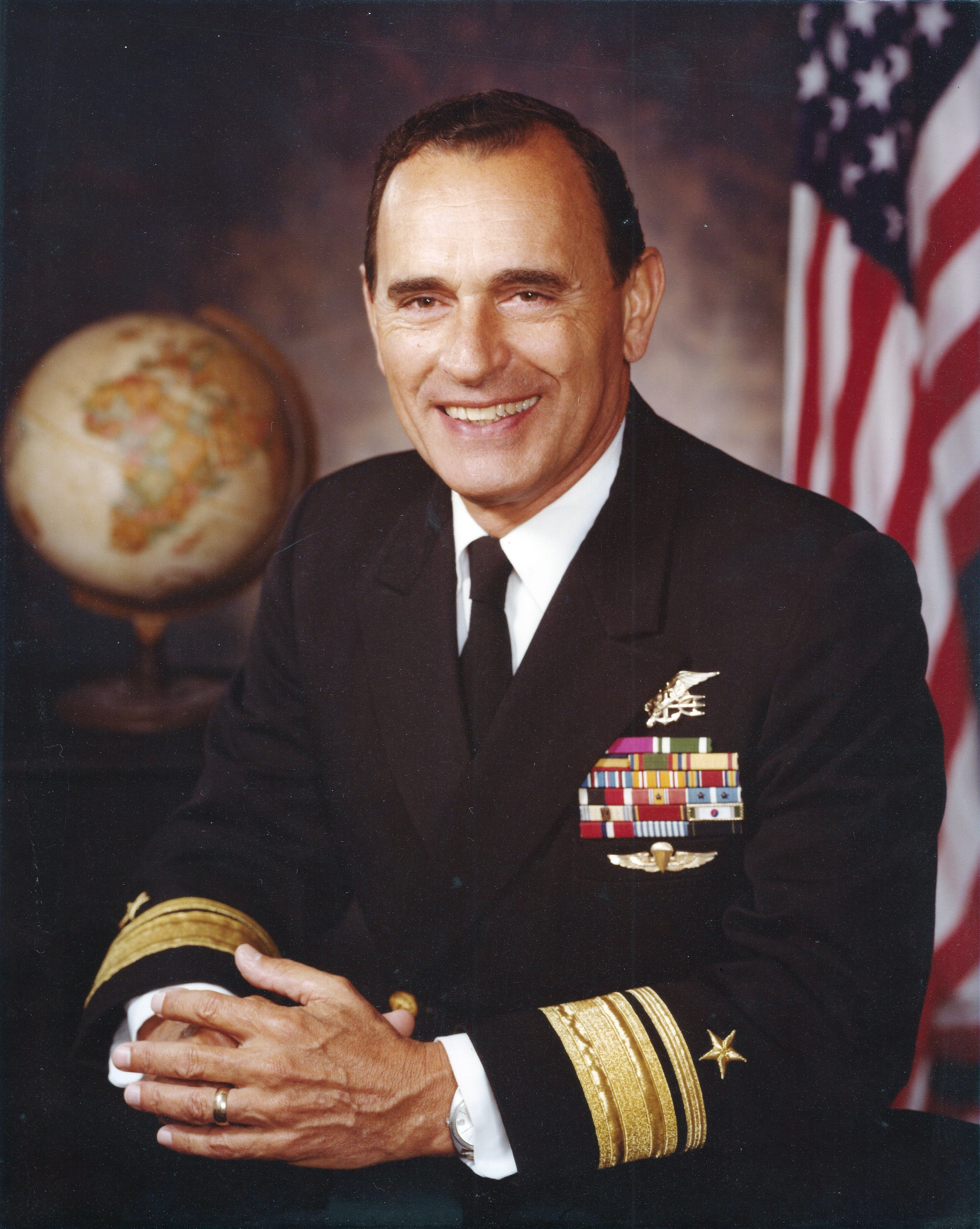
- Richard Lyon in 1975
- Born: July 14, 1923; Pasadena, California, U.S.
- Died: February 3, 2017 (aged 93); Oceanside, California, U.S.
- Military career
- Allegiance: United States of America
- Branch: United States Navy
- Service years: 1942–1983 (41 years)
- Rank: Rear admiral
- Nickname: Dick
- Commands: Deputy Chief, Navy Reserve; UDT Team 5
- Conflicts: World War II; Korean War
- Awards: Legion of Merit; Commendation Medal; Combat Action Ribbon
- Other work: Mayor, Trustee

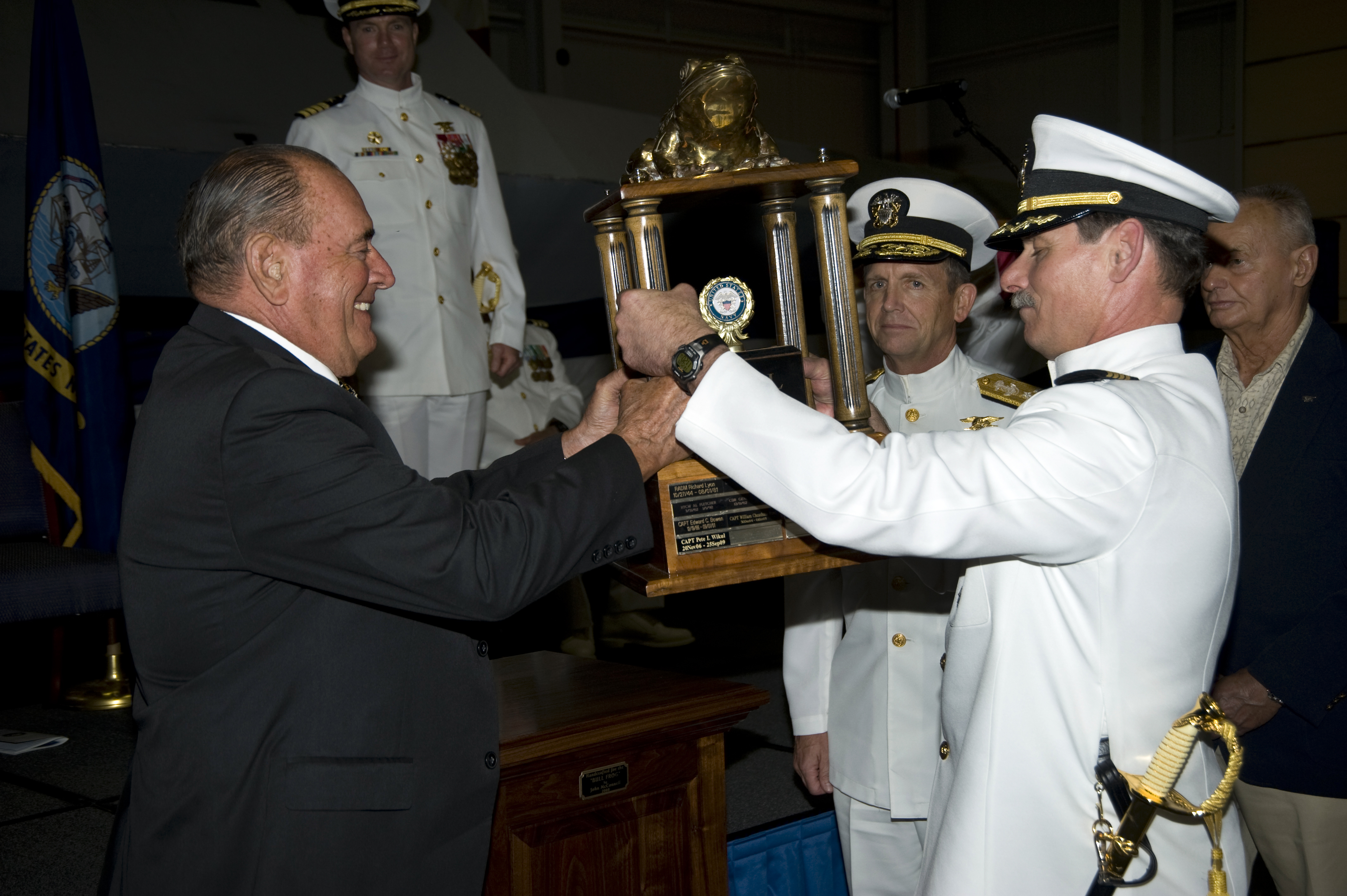
Rear Adm. Dick Lyon, the first Bullfrog, left, passes the Bullfrog trophy to Capt. Pete Wikul

Richard "Dick" Lyon (July 14, 1923 – February 3, 2017) was a United States Navy admiral and mayor of Oceanside, California.

== Early life and education ==
Lyon was born in Pasadena, California, where he attended high school with friend and fellow classmate Jackie Robinson. As a youth, he was a selected member of the United States Olympic swim team for the 1940 Summer Olympics in Tokyo, but the 1940 games were canceled due to the outbreak of World War II. Lyon graduated from Yale University in 1944 and that year he was captain of the Yale Bulldogs swimming and diving team with a season record of 10-0. He earned a master's degree from Stanford University in 1953.

== Naval career ==
Lyon attended Columbia University Midshipmen's School, receiving his commission in the United States Navy in October 1944. He served as a Navy Scout and Raider in the Pacific Theatre and in China as an Intelligence Officer. He was released from active duty in 1946, subsequently joining the Naval Reserve. He returned to active duty in early 1951 he commissioned the Underwater Demolition Team Five, and served in the Korean War until late 1952. Upon release, he resumed his Reserve participation.

On 1 July 1974, Lyon became the first admiral from the Naval Special Warfare community in the history of the Navy.

Lyon was a graduate of both the National War College and the Naval War College. He was the first Reserve officer to be appointed to the board of directors of the United States Naval Institute, where he served as chairman of the editorial board. He has received decorations for the Legion of Merit, Navy Commendation Medal and Combat Action Ribbon.

He returned to active duty as Deputy Chief of Naval Reserve in July 1978, and retired in July 1983 at the rank of rear admiral after nearly 41 years of naval service.

== Political career ==
Lyon was elected mayor of the City of Oceanside in November 1992, and was re-elected in 1996.

== Personal life ==
Lyon was a private pilot and an avid sailor, body-surfer and golfer. He was married to Cynthia Gisslin, and had nine children. He resided in Oceanside from 1981 until his death in February 2017.
