= Robert E. Laws =

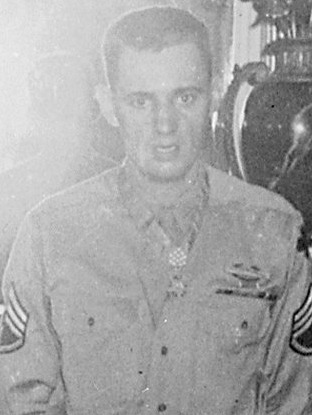
- Robert Laws after receiving his Medal of Honor from President Harry S. Truman on August 23, 1945
- Born: January 18, 1921; Altoona, Pennsylvania, US
- Died: January 1, 1990 (aged 68)
- Burial place: Blair Memorial Park, Bellwood, Pennsylvania
- Military career
- Allegiance: United States of America
- Branch: United States Army
- Rank: Staff Sergeant
- Units: 169th Infantry Regiment, 43rd Infantry Division
- Conflicts: World War II
- Awards: Medal of Honor

Robert Earl Laws (January 18, 1921 – January 1, 1990) was a United States Army soldier and a recipient of the United States military's highest decoration—the Medal of Honor—for his actions in World War II.

== Biography ==
Laws joined the Army from his birth city of Altoona, Pennsylvania in July 1942, and by January 12, 1945, was serving as a staff sergeant in Company G, 169th Infantry Regiment, 43rd Infantry Division. On that day, in Pangasinan, Luzon, the Philippines, he single-handedly destroyed a Japanese pillbox. Despite being wounded, he then led an attack on enemy rifle positions and engaged a Japanese soldier in hand to hand combat. For these actions, he was awarded the Medal of Honor eight months later, on September 10, 1945.

Laws left the Army while still a staff sergeant.

He participated in the 1952 unveiling of the PRR's World War II memorial statue located in 30th Street Station, Philadelphia.

He died at age 68 and was buried in Blair Memorial Park, Bellwood, Pennsylvania.

== Medal of Honor citation ==
Staff Sergeant Laws' official Medal of Honor citation reads:

He led the assault squad when Company G attacked enemy hill positions. The enemy force, estimated to be a reinforced infantry company, was well supplied with machineguns, ammunition, grenades, and blocks of TNT and could be attacked only across a narrow ridge 70 yards long. At the end of this ridge an enemy pillbox and rifle positions were set in rising ground. Covered by his squad, S/Sgt Laws traversed the hogback through vicious enemy fire until close to the pillbox, where he hurled grenades at the fortification. Enemy grenades wounded him, but he persisted in his assault until 1 of his missiles found its mark and knocked out the pillbox. With more grenades, passed to him by members of his squad who had joined him, he led the attack on the entrenched riflemen. In the advance up the hill, he suffered additional wounds in both arms and legs, about the body and in the head, as grenades and TNT charges exploded near him. Three Japs rushed him with fixed bayonets, and he emptied the magazine of his machine pistol at them, killing 2. He closed in hand-to-hand combat with the third, seizing the Jap's rifle as he met the onslaught. The 2 fell to the ground and rolled some 50 or 60 feet down a bank. When the dust cleared the Jap lay dead and the valiant American was climbing up the hill with a large gash across the head. He was given first aid and evacuated from the area while his squad completed the destruction of the enemy position. S/Sgt. Laws' heroic actions provided great inspiration to his comrades, and his courageous determination, in the face of formidable odds and while suffering from multiple wounds, enabled them to secure an important objective with minimum casualties.

== Awards and decorations ==

Badge	Combat Infantryman Badge		
1st row	Medal of Honor		Bronze Star Medal
2nd row	Purple Heart	Army Good Conduct Medal	American Campaign Medal
3rd row	Asiatic-Pacific Campaign Medal with four campaign stars	World War II Victory Medal	Philippine Liberation Medal with one campaign star
Unit awards	Presidential Unit Citation		

== See also ==
- List of Medal of Honor recipients
- List of Medal of Honor recipients for World War II
