= South Pacific Scouts =

The South Pacific Scouts were a jungle warfare unit formed during World War II from Fijians and Solomon Islanders. They participated in the American landings at New Georgia in 1943.
