= 229th Infantry Regiment =

The 229th Infantry Regiment was an infantry regiment in the Imperial Japanese Army. The 229th consisted of conscripts drawn mainly from Gifu Prefecture. The regiment was attached to the 38th Division. The regiment participated during the Second Sino-Japanese War, the conquest of Hong Kong in 1941, the Dutch East Indies in early 1942, the Guadalcanal Campaign and Papua Campaign. While the 1st and 2nd Battalions were on Guadalcanal, its 3rd Battalion fought in the Battle of Buna–Gona in Territory of Papua from November 1942 to January 1943, where it was destroyed. The regiment was re-formed and later fought during the New Georgia campaign where the regiment was commanded by Colonel Hirata Genjiro, while the 1st Battalion was commanded by Major Hara Masauo while Major Kojima Bunzo commanded the 3rd Battalion.

== Organization ==
- 1st Battalion
- 2nd Battalion
- 3rd Battalion
