= John H. Hester =

United States Army general

John Hutchison Hester
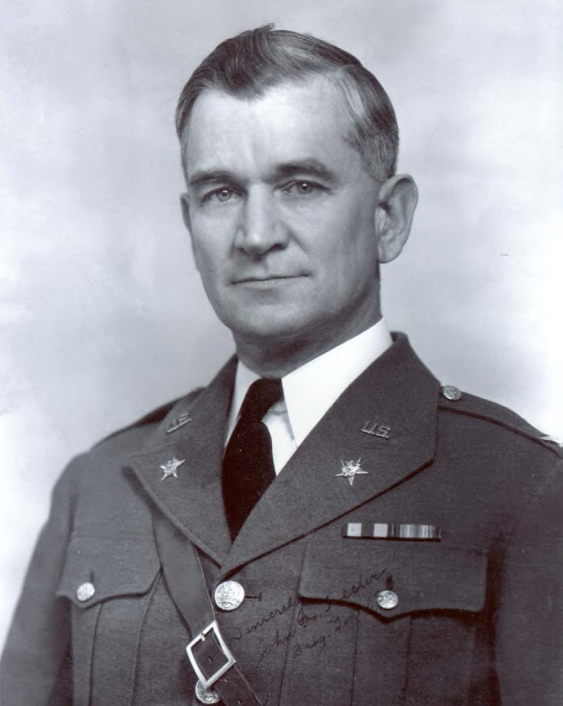
- Hester as a brigadier general
- Born: 11 September 1886; Albany, Georgia, US
- Died: 11 February 1976 (aged 89); Atlanta, Georgia, US
- Military career
- Allegiance: United States
- Branch: United States Army
- Service years: 1908-1946
- Rank: Major General
- Commands: 43rd Infantry Division
- Conflicts: Pancho Villa Expedition; World War I World War II: New Georgia Campaign
- Awards: Legion of Merit (2)

John Hutchison Hester (11 September 1886 – 11 February 1976) was a major general in the United States Army who commanded the 43rd Infantry Division during World War II.

== Early career ==
Hester was born on 11 September 1886 in Albany, Georgia. He attended the University of Georgia before entering the United States Military Academy at West Point, New York. Hester graduated in June 1908 and was commissioned second lieutenant of infantry. He was assigned to Fort McPherson, Georgia as his first assignment and served there until 1913.

Lieutenant Hester participated in the Pancho Villa Expedition in Mexico during 1916 and later was transferred to Washington, D.C., where he was assigned to the General Staff.

He served with the rank of lieutenant colonel as professor of military science and tactics at the University of Minnesota until the end of September 1933, when he was appointed executive officer of the 65th Infantry Regiment in Puerto Rico. Hester spent the next two years there, before he was ordered back to the United States and assigned to the Operations and Plan Section at the War Department General Staff. During his service there, he was promoted to the rank of colonel on 1 March 1937.

His next assignment was commanding officer of the 1st Infantry Regiment in August 1939. Hester simultaneously served as commanding officer of Camp Jackson, South Carolina. He was subsequently transferred to the War Department, where he was appointed executive officer of the Reserves and Reserve Officers' Training Corps Affairs. During his service in this capacity, Hester was promoted to the rank of brigadier general on 1 November 1940.

== World War II ==
At the end of March 1941, Brigadier General Hester was transferred to Camp Wheeler, Georgia, where he took command of the Infantry Replacement Training Center. In October 1941, Hester took command of the 43rd Infantry Division, where he relieved National Guard Major General Morris B. Payne. He was promoted to the rank of major general in February 1942, shortly after the United States entered World War II.

The 43rd Division went overseas in October 1942 and participated in the landings at the Russell Islands and Rendova Island. Hester commanded the 43rd Division during the attack on Munda Airport held by Japanese forces at the end of July 1943. However, he was replaced by Major General John R. Hodge on 29 July 1943. The official reason for Hester's relief was "exhaustion of combat". Hester was subsequently sent back to the United States and granted two months leave for recovery. He was also decorated with the Legion of Merit for the success of the initial stages of the New Georgia Campaign.

General Hester was appointed commanding general of the Tank Destroyer Center at Camp Hood, Texas on 23 October 1943. His final assignment was the post of commanding general of the Infantry Replacement Training Center at Camp Croft, South Carolina, where he arrived on 26 June 1944.

== Later life and death ==
He finally retired from the army on 28 February 1946, long after the war ended, and was decorated with his second Legion of Merit for his service in this capacity.

Hester died aged 89 in Atlanta on February 11, 1976, and was buried at Arlington Memorial Park in Sandy Springs, Georgia.

== Decorations ==

1st Row	Legion of Merit with Oak Leaf Cluster		
2nd Row	Mexican Service Medal	World War I Victory Medal	American Defense Service Medal
3rd Row	American Campaign Medal	Asiatic-Pacific Campaign Medal with two service stars	World War II Victory Medal

Military offices
Preceded by Morris B. Payne	Commanding General 43rd Infantry Division; 1941–1941	Succeeded by John R. Hodge
