= 169th Infantry Regiment (United States) =

169th Infantry Regiment (1st Connecticut)
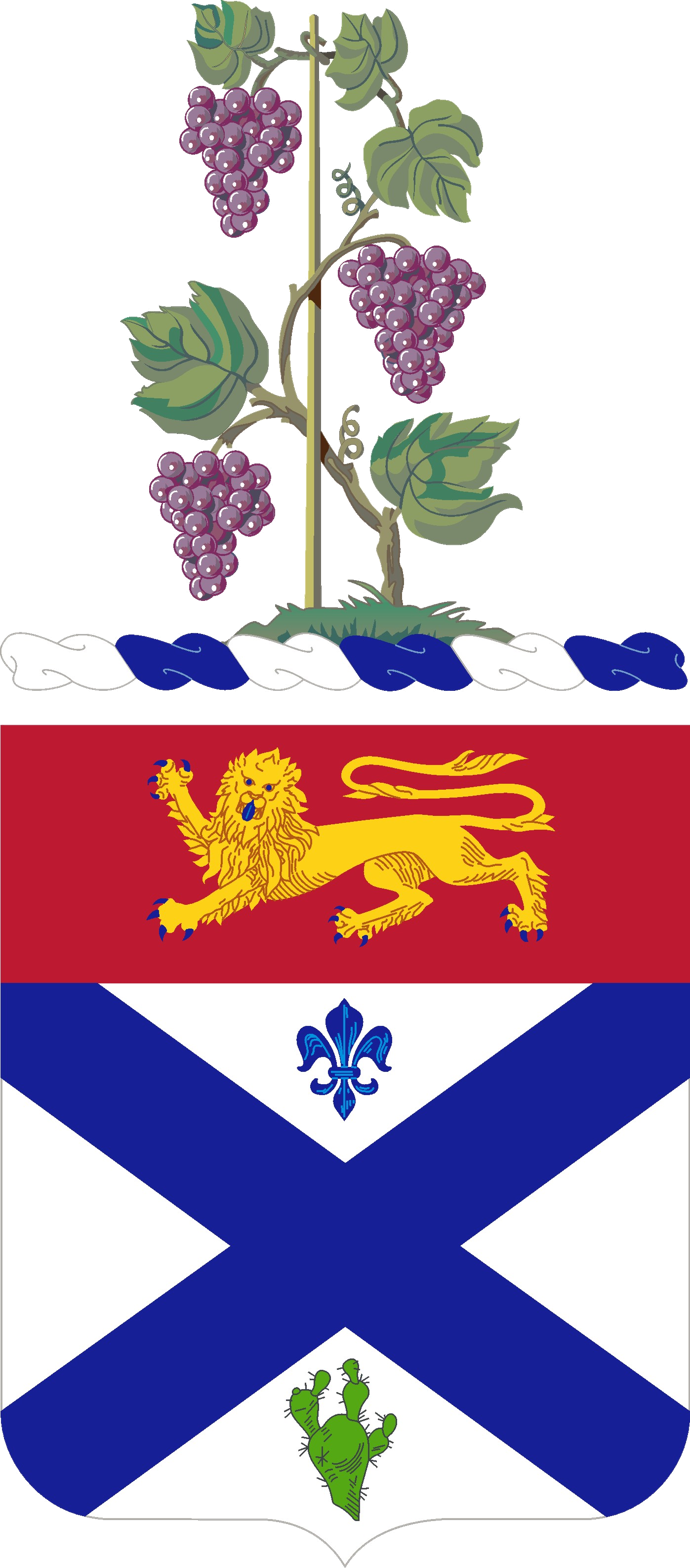
- Coat of arms
- Active: 1672–1992
- Country: United States
- Allegiance: Connecticut
- Branch: United States Army
- Type: Infantry
- Size: Regiment
- Part of: Connecticut Army National Guard
- Motto: Armis Stant Leges – Laws are Maintained by the Force of Arms
- Engagements: French and Indian War; American Revolutionary War: Battle of Long Island; Battle of Saratoga; War of 1812; American Civil War: First Battle of Bull Run; Spanish–American War; Pancho Villa Expedition; World War II: New Georgia Campaign; New Guinea Campaign; Battle of Luzon; Campaign Streamers American Revolutionary War: Saratoga; New York 1776; New York 1777; Connecticut 1777; Connecticut 1778; Connecticut 1779; War of 1812 Civil War: Bull Run; Antietam; Fredericksburg; Gettysburg; Chancelorsville; Mississippi River; Atlanta; Petersburg; Georgia 1862; South Carolina 1862; South Carolina 1863; Florida 1863; Virginia 1863; Georgia 1864; Virginia 1864; North Carolina 1865; Mexican Border World War I: Champagne-Marne; Aisne-Marne; St. Mihael; Meuse-Argonne; Ile de France 1918; Lorraine 1918; World War II: Guadalcanal; New Guinea; Northern Solomons; Luzon (with arrowhead)

Commanders
- Notable commanders: Kenneth F. Cramer; John H. McGee; William H. Craig

Insignia
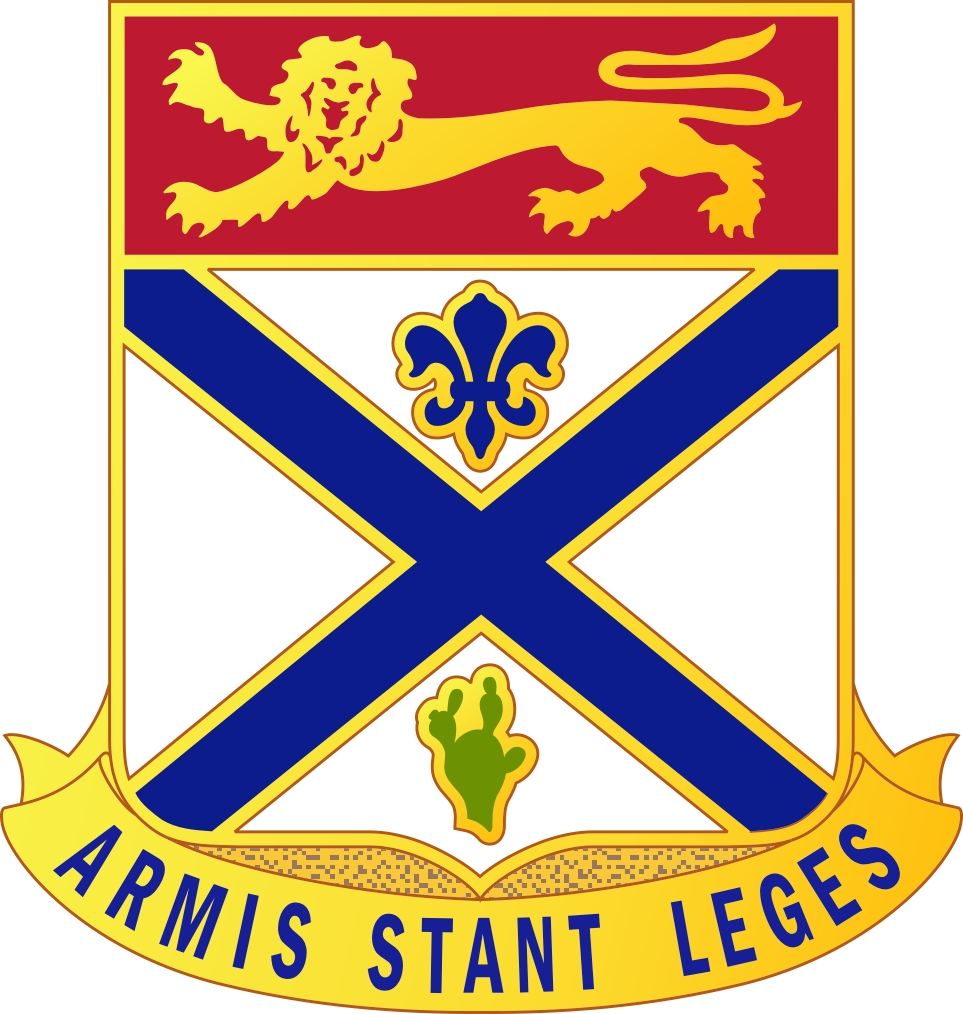
- Distinctive unit insignia

The 169th Infantry Regiment is an infantry regiment of the United States Army and Connecticut National Guard. The regiment may be traced to English train bands that formed in settlements of Windsor, Hartford, and Wethersfield as these settlements consolidated from 1633 to 1636 and deployed during the Pequot War from 1636 to 1638. As the settlements in what would become Hartford County grew, the militia was reorganized for drill in 1672 essentially into a county regiment. The U.S. Army recognizes the regiment from its reorganization by an act of the Connecticut Assembly on 11 October 1739 as the 1st Connecticut Regiment. It is Connecticut's oldest regiment when considered from its formation of train bands in 1633 to 1636 in Windsor, Hartford, and Wethersfield.

With its deployment in the Pequot War the regiment continued its deployments in every war of the colonial period to include King Philip's War in the 1670s, the French and Indian or Seven Years War, and in U.S. service from the American Revolution in every war except Vietnam until its last combat battalion was inactivated. The regiment's last combat infantry battalion, a battalion of the 43rd Infantry Brigade, 26th Infantry Division was inactivated in 1992.

The regiment continues its service in the Connecticut Army National Guard as the 169th Regiment (Regional Training Institute). The regiment is a distinguished formation authorized to fly 39 U.S. campaign streamers from its colors.

== History ==
=== Early history ===
The 169th Infantry Regiment traces its heritage back to the English train bands organized in the settlements of Windsor, Hartford and Wethersfield from 1633 to 1636. These militia units mobilized and deployed during the Pequot War of 1636 to 1638. It also operated against the Dutch in the Hartford Area. The Hartford County, Connecticut, train bands were later organized into the Regiment of Hartford County in 1672 and would deploy during King Philip's War in 1675 to 1676. The regiment was the security bulwark of the Connecticut colony in North Central Connecticut with further deployments throughout the colonial period such as the deployment north to Deerfield in Massachusetts in 1704. On 11 October 1739 by an act of the Connecticut Assembly the regiment was organized into the First Connecticut Regiment. This is the date the U.S. Army recognizes as the organization date of the 169th Infantry. During the French and Indian War, the 1st Connecticut was called up on 7–8 August 1757 for a period of two weeks to man fortifications. Volunteers from Hartford, Simsbury, and Windsor were enlisted, and it is unknown whether these militiamen saw action in combat. However, Connecticut field regiments raised in several wars during this period to include the French and Indian War (Seven Years War) drew many of their soldiers from the militia regiments and some of the operations participated in by these soldiers were significant such as the siege of Quebec in two different wars and operations around Louisbourg in the Seven Years War.

=== American Revolutionary War ===
In the summer of 1776, General George Washington called upon the state militias to meet the British Empire's suspected attack on New York. The 1st Regiment of the Connecticut militia responded, and they reported for duty on 11 August 1776. The militia troops were hastily assembled, poorly armed, meagerly paid, thus discipline and morale was low. On 15 September 1776, they were attacked by the British Army and retreated in the face of superior firepower. The 1st Connecticut militia was ordered to reinforce General Horatio Gates at Saratoga in the fall of 1777 and served under the command of General Enoch Poor. The Connecticuters fought heavily at the Battle of Freeman's Farm on 19 September 1777, and at the Battle of Bemis Heights on 7 October. At Bemis Heights, they lost more men than any other regiment engaged, and General Gates referred to them as the "excellent militia regiment from Connecticut".

=== War of 1812 ===
On 28 April 1812, Governor Roger Griswold ordered the mobilization of 3,000 militiamen to repel any British invasion during the War of 1812. The 1st Regiment consisted of 121 officers and men and began their service on 7 June 1813 when they marched to New London. On 28 July 1814, the Connecticut militia deployed along the coast from Stonington to Greenwich to deter an enemy invasion. The 1st contributed 522 officers and men for the task, and were relieved on 27 October 1814.

=== American Civil War and Spanish–American War ===
On 15 April 1861, President Abraham Lincoln issued a call for volunteers after the fall of Fort Sumter, and the 1st Connecticut Volunteer Infantry Regiment was mustered in on 22–23 April. A Company was designated as a "Rifle Company," and B and C Companies were designated as "Infantry Companies". The regiment arrived at Washington, D.C., on 13 May, and camped at Glenwood, 2 miles to the north of the capitol. On 1 June, the 1st Connecticut relieved the 12th New York Volunteer Infantry and engaged in their first engagement of the Civil War at Vienna, Virginia, where they were ambushed by Confederate troops, and PVT George H. Bugbee of A Company was wounded; the regiment's first casualty of the war. The regiment fought in the First Battle of Bull Run on 21 July, where they engaged in constant activity against the enemy, and repelled infantry and cavalry attacks from 1,000 to 1,600. The 1st Connecticut remained in Washington until 27 July, and were mustered out in New Haven, Connecticut, on 31 July 1861 when their period of enlistment expired. Parts of the regiment remained in service with the 4th Connecticut Infantry Regiment and the 7th Connecticut Infantry Regiment.

The 1st Connecticut Infantry was recalled to federal service on 26 April 1898 for duty in the Spanish–American War. They were destined to invade the island of Puerto Rico, but they never saw active service and were mustered out on 31 October 1898.

=== Mexican Border ===
The 1st Connecticut was called up on 18 June 1916 by President Woodrow Wilson, and the 1,100 officers and men of the regiment assembled at Camp Holcomb in Niantic and departed for the Mexico–United States border, arriving in El Paso, Texas, on 2 July. On 7 July, the Connecticuters began patrolling near Nogales, Arizona. For 13 weeks, the regiment patrolled the border and encountered slight enemy resistance during their time there but suffered no casualties. They continued their training at Fort Huachuca on 24 August before returning to Nogales in September and continuing patrols in conjunction with the 2nd Connecticut, soon to be the 102nd Infantry Regiment.

=== World War I ===
When the United States began its involvement in the First World War, the 1st Connecticut mustered into Federal Service 25-31 March 1917 (per General Orders No. 61, Adjutant General's Office, Connecticut) at home stations: drafted into Federal service 5 August 1917 (35 officers and 1,582 enlisted men transferred with soldiers of the 2nd Connecticut Regiment to the 102nd Infantry 24 August 1917). Both regiments would share the operational history of the 102nd Infantry with the 26th Division. Extensive combat would be experienced in France, the regiment's soldiers participating in the following campaigns; Champagne-Marne, Aisne-Marne, St. Mihael, Meuse-Argonne, Ile de France 1918, Lorraine 1918.

"On 25 March 1917, per Special Order Number 61, The Adjutant General, State of Connecticut, upon the call of the President for troops of the National Guard, the First Regiment Connecticut Infantry was ordered to mobilize for Federal service at 0700 hours 26 March 1917. The Regiment remained at its home station (Hartford) performing guard duty and recruiting to war strength. On 23 July 1917 it went into camp at Pratt Field, New Haven, adjacent to Yale Field, where the 2[n]d Infantry was encamped. On 5 August 1917 it was drafted into Federal service. The formation of the 102nd Infantry Regiment was accomplished on 25 August 1917, in accordance with instructions issued from Boston through a consolidation of the old First and Second Regiments. To this new regiment the old First contributed 35 officers and 1,582 enlisted men. The war-time history of the 102nd Infantry thereby becomes the heritage of both these old historic regiments."

Between 7 and 25 September 1917, all units of the 102nd sailed for Liverpool, England, en route for Le Havre, France, where they arrived on various dates from 24 September to 12 November. A detachment from the Medical Detachment and one from the Supply Company sailed direct to France, arriving at St. Nazaire on 5 October and 7 December respectively.

The assembled regiment went into training near the town of Neufchateau, in the foothills of the Vosges Mountains, where it trained with the 167th Regiment (French).

The regiment saw its first front-line service on the Chemin des Dames beginning 8 February 1918, when the Second Battalion was brigaded with the 137th Regiment (French): continuing through 7 March, when it began to operate a sector independently, and being terminated on 20 March, when it was relieved in all positions by the French. Even in this so-called "quiet" area it suffered 494 casualties, as its first front-line experience of the war.

On 29 March, orders were received to relieve the First Division in the Toul Sector: on the 3lst the First Battalion relieved a battalion of the 26th Infantry; and during the next night the Second Battalion similarly relieved a battalion of the 28th, while the Third Battalion went into reserve at Mandres and Ansauville. The outstanding event of this tour of duty was the fight at Seicheprey on 20 April. By 1:30 a.m. on that date the relief of M Company by D and I Company by C had been completed. At 3 a.m. the enemy put down a heavy barrage on our positions; at 5 a.m. he attacked with from 1,200 to 1,500 "Sturmtruppen," preceding the 259 Regiment German) and two or three companies of territorials (elsewhere given as two infantry battalions) with machine guns, sappers and pioneers. After a determined resistance our troops were overpowered, except in Seicheprey itself. During the night of the 20th-21st, the enemy withdrew. The German casualties were heavy, variously given at from 600 to 1,800 while ours for the entire month of April amounted to 71 killed, 134 wounded and 12 gassed, or a total of 327 exclusive of a considerable number of prisoners captured by the Germans. Except for a short period (2 May – 13 May) the regiment continued in this sector until finally relieved by the 154th Division (French) and the 82nd Division (American) between 24 and 28 June.

Early July found the regiment in the vicinity of Chateau Thierry and Belleau Woods, where on the 7th and 8th it relieved units of the 23rd Infantry, Second Division (American). From these positions it attacked on 20 July, as a part of the great offensive then under way to wipe out the Chateau Thiery salient. The leading battalion, the Third, attacked at 3 p.m. and by 7 p.m. had reached and consolidated on its objective, the far edge of the Bois de Bouresches. The advance beyond that line was rapid until late afternoon of the 2Ist, when the regiment approached Trugny and Epieds. Here the Germans, determined to gain sufficient time for the withdrawal of their troops from the salient, interposed strong resistance. Next morning the attack was renewed by the First Battalion. Its forces were quickly decimated; in about half an hour after the attack started it was reduced from 500 to 50 in numbers. However. it succeeded in gaining a precarious foothold in Trugny; before the morning was over these survivors, still further reduced in numbers, were either killed or captured. Again the attack was made at 4 p.m., and although it was much better supported on the right and left, the result was the same. Next day the I0lst attacked while the 102nd maintained its positions and reorganized its much-reduced companies: the attack of the 101st was without success. During the night of the 23rd the enemy withdrew and the 102nd resumed its advance, marching at the head of the main body. Late on the afternoon of the 25th the regiment then in the La Fere Forest was passed through by elements of the 42nd Division (American), which brought to an end the 102nd's participation in this fight, but no before the regiment had suffered 1,198 casualties, of which 137 were killed, 541 wounded, and 520 gassed.

The regiment was soon to participate in battle as a part of the First Army (American) to reduce the St. Mihiel salient. The 3lst of August found the 102nd at Longueville; a series of night marches brought the regiment to le Soff Bois, in rear of the 101st which had relieved the French. The attack orders issued on the 11th placed the 102nd in division reserve; before the day's fighting was done, however, on the 12th, the First Battalion had been ordered to go "through" a battalion of the 10lst which had been held up: its advance enabled al elements of the division to reach the first day's objective by 10 p.m. Then came orders to make a forced march down La Grande Tranchee de Colonne, a night march of more than nine kilometers into territory occupied by the Germans, to Vigneulles, there to meet the advance of the First Division (American) from the other side of the salient. Vigneules was reached at 2:30 a.m. on the I3th; about 9 a.m., contact was made with elements of the hirst: the salient was reduced. A large number of prisoners (almost 1,000) was captured; but our own casualties were slight.

The regiment remained in this area, which came to be known as the Troyon Sector, for some time. organizing the sector and participating in two important raids, those of St. Hilaire on 22 and 23 September and Riaville-Marcheville on the 26th. On the nights of 6 and 7 October the relief of the division by elements of the Second Division C. A. P. (French), the 29th Division (French), and the 79th Division (American) was accomplished. Next night movement by marching vie Verdun to another sector was begun. On the night of 16-17 October, the regiment relieved the 66th R. I. F. (French) and the 113th Infantry, 29th Division (American) north of Verdun and east of the Meuse. Here its job in conjunction with the remainder of the division was to so harass and occupy the enemy that he could not withdraw his troops from that front or reinforce his line further to the north; the mission was that of "active-defensive." Beginning on 24 October a series of attacks against the very strong position centering on Cote 360 was made, but with very limited success due to the inability of troops on the left to take their objective. On the 28th the First and Second Battalions were relieved by the 104th and on the 3lst the Second was relieved by the 314th Infantry, 79th Division (American). During these few days of fighting the regiment experienced its heaviest casualties of the war: 1,278 in all – 187 killed, 590 wounded, 501 gassed. Only a few days later on the nights of 1 and 2 November, the regiment relieved elements of the 26th (French) in the so-called "Neptune Sector," in the same general area in which it had been fighting. Attacks with some local success were made on the 8th, 9th, and 10th, and it was on this front, still prepared for further attack, that the Armistice found the regiment.

This ended the regiment's active participation in the World War--"some 9,000 officers and men had passed through its ranks, of whom 4,150 had become casualties- 476 killed, 1,765 wounded, and 1,909 gassed--not including sick, prisoners of war, missing in action, or died of disease or wounds. The division of which this regiment was a part acquired the record for the longest stay in the front line of any which served in France. The troops demobilized in April 1919."

To emphasize and note, the remaining regiment's personnel not consolidated with the 2nd Regiment into the 102nd Infantry, 28 officers and 169 enlisted men, reorganized and redesignated as the 58th Pioneer Infantry Regiment 11 February 1918 deploying to Camp Wadswoth, South Carolina. The 58th Pioneer Infantry Regiment would be assigned over 3,400 men and engage in extensive pre-deployment training. The war ended just as the regiment was about to deploy to France.

=== Interwar period ===
The 169th Infantry Regiment was newly constituted in the National Guard in 1921, assigned to the 43rd Division, and allotted to the state of Connecticut. It was organized on 23 May 1921 by consolidation and redesignation of the 1st and 2nd Infantry Regiments, Connecticut National Guard, as the Connecticut Regiment of Infantry. The headquarters was concurrently organized and federally recognized at Hartford. It was redesignated as the 169th Infantry on 7 October 1921.

From 23 December 1920 to 23 June 1923, the 169th Infantry expanded until it embodied 15 company sized units, a medical detachment, a band, and three headquarters detachments. Companies A and D were recruited from Meriden Company B was recruited from Middletown, and Company C was recruited from Bristol. Companies E, F, G, and H were all recruited from Hartford. Companies I and M were formed from New Britain men. Company K was a Manchester unit and Company L was recruited from Willimantic.

The lineage of the 2nd Infantry Regiment, Connecticut National Guard, was withdrawn from the 169th Infantry on 20 October 1922 and the regiment was concurrently redesignated the 170th Infantry. Per the terms of the National Defense Act of 1920, the former 2nd Connecticut was allowed to keep its World War I designation, being redesignated as the 102nd Infantry on 28 February 1924. The assignment of regimental lineages per the act that would satisfy the desires of states, soldiers, and politicians to get back their "old" units sometimes proved difficult, as during the war, many regiments had been made up of units from multiple states, and after the war, allotments were changed and new regiments were constituted.

The entire 169th Infantry was called up to perform the following state duties: riot control during a textile workers strike at Putnam and Danielson, Connecticut, in September 1934; flood relief at Hartford, 19 March–1 April 1936; hurricane relief in the vicinity of Rockville, Connecticut, 22–27 September 1938. The regiment conducted annual summer training most years at the state military reservation at Niantic, Connecticut, and some years at Camp Devens, Massachusetts. Inducted into active Federal service at Hartford on 24 February 1941, and moved to Camp Blanding, FL, where it arrived 15 March 1941.

The 169th Infantry Regiment was ordered to mobilize on 24 February 1941. The regiment moved to Camp Blanding, Florida, and upon induction, consisted of 132 officers and 1,825 enlisted men. Under the command of Colonel Kenneth F. Cramer, the 169th trained hard for 13 weeks, and from 17 to 28 June, the regiment received 950 draftees to fill their ranks. The 169th trained in Florida, Louisiana, North Carolina, and South Carolina until 4 December. At this time, the count was 90 officers, 1 warrant officer, and 2,219 enlisted men.

=== World War II ===
The Attack on Pearl Harbor on 7 December 1941 marked the entry of the United States in the Second World War. On 11 December 1941, 22 officers and 700 enlisted men of the 169th were transferred to the 102nd Regiment, who were detached from the 43rd Infantry Division. At Camp Shelby, Mississippi, the 169th received 900 new recruits on 21 February 1942 and began training them right away. Another 900 raw recruits were received on 22 May 1942. On 30 September 1942, the 169th Infantry Regiment left San Francisco, California, and sailed to New Zealand with a total strength of 139 officers, 5 warrant officers, and 3,138 enlisted men.

The regiment arrived in New Zealand on 22 October, and engaged in intensive training on the island until 22 November 1942. On 28 November, the 169th arrived in Nouméa, New Caledonia and garrisoned the island while conducting intensive jungle warfare training, loading and unloading ships, and guarding Japanese prisoners of war. The 169th embarked for Guadalcanal on 15 February 1943, and two days into the voyage, the convoy was attacked by Japanese torpedo planes. Aboard the USS President Hayes, CPL John E. A. Gagnon, of H Company, 169th Infantry, managed to shoot down an enemy plane with a .50 caliber machine-gun. On 18 February, the convoy docked at Guadalcanal and bivouacked on the island. On 23–24 February, the 1st and 2nd Battalions of the 169th made an amphibious assault on the island of Pavuvu in the Russell Islands against no resistance. The regiment's first casualties came during their occupation of Pavuvu when Japanese planes strafed their positions. 3rd Battalion arrived on Pavuvu on 27 March. For the next few months, the 169th conducted jungle warfare training on the island and honed their battle skills before their next assignment.

==== New Georgia ====
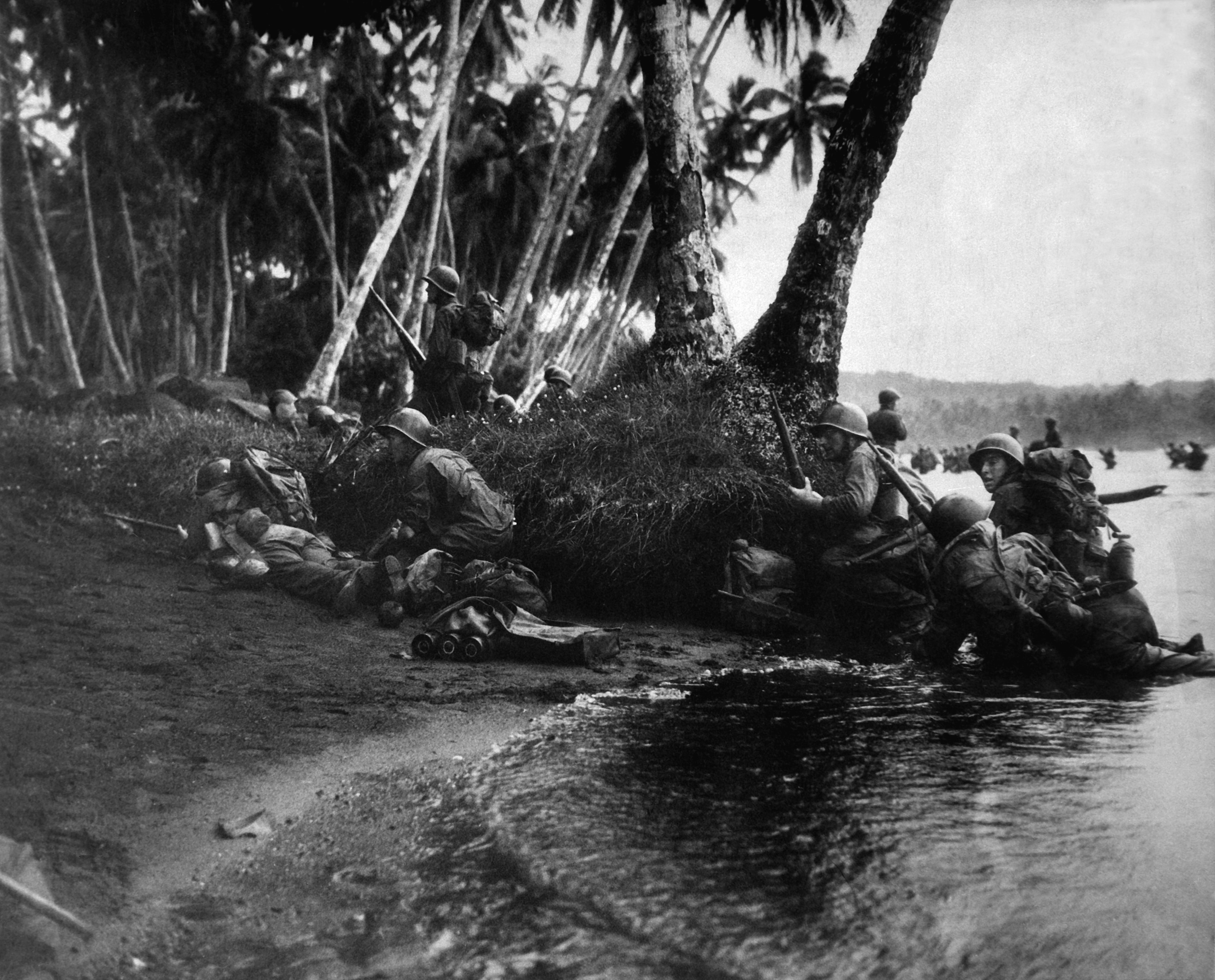
Landing operations on Rendova Island 30 June 1943

Operation "Toenails," or the Invasion of New Georgia, would be the next mission the 169th would undertake. As a part of the 43rd Infantry Division operation, the Regiment seized Rendova Island against minimal opposition on 30 June. Elements of the 169th soon landed on the southern coast of New Georgia on 2 July and began to march alongside the 172nd Infantry Regiment toward Munda Point to capture the Munda Airfield there. The men of the regiment "were soon introduced to the harsh realities of jungle warfare." The main attack was scheduled to begin on 9 July 1943, but the 169th (unaccustomed to combat) was exhausted after spending a sleepless night shooting at real and imagined enemy patrols. The drive resumed on 11 July, but was completely stalled by combat casualties, fatigue, jungle diseases, and continuous rain. Static warfare in the dense jungle made the drive on Munda Point bitter and frustrating for the men of the 169th. By 17 July, the main line of Japanese resistance had not been reached, but the regiment had already suffered 90 men killed and 600 men wounded along with many psychoneurotic casualties. By on 18 July, the Japanese attempted to drive the 1st Battalion (1-169) off of "Kelley Hill," but the Connecticuters killed 102 of their enemy and drove them back. After heavy fighting along the line, the airfield was finally captured after heavy loss on 5 August 1943. From 6–10 August, the beleaguered regiment guarded Munda Airfield and were subjected to minor enemy air attacks. 3rd Battalion (3-169) was ordered to seize the island of Baanga northwest west of Munda Point and met heavy resistance and elements were soon pinned down on the beaches and in the dense jungle. 2-169 landed on Baanga to reinforce the attack, but the Japanese resistance on the islands was much stronger than anticipated and the advance made slow, if any, progress. On 20 August they were relieved by elements of the 172nd Infantry Regiment. This "non-battle" on Baanga had cost the Americans 44 dead and 74 wounded; L Company was reduced to just 16 men. From 25 August to 9 September, the regiment patrolled and guarded Munda Airfield until they were ordered to assist the 172nd Infantry in clearing Arundel Island which they managed to secure on 21 August. Here they suffered 4 killed and 29 wounded. The regiment moved back to Munda, and defended the airstrip until 19 January 1944, when 3-169 was ordered to Vella Lavella to defend the airstrip there. The regiment then arrived in New Zealand for R&R on 1 March. The men had free time, furloughs, awards ceremonies, training exercises, and parades while in New Zealand.

==== New Guinea ====
The 169th Infantry Regiment arrived at Aitape, New Guinea, on 17 July 1944, to reinforce General Walter Krueger's Sixth Army. The regiment was ordered to construct defensive lines in the area to support the 32nd Infantry Division already fighting in the area. Japanese patrols constantly harassed the men, and they launched a counterattack on 22 July. The 169th threw this charge back and inflicted 274 deaths on the enemy. Patrolling and encountering the enemy was commonplace in the Aitape region, and the men experienced hard fighting along the Drinuimor River and nearby ridges on 31 July. Hard fighting in the hills, jungles, and villages near Aitape continued until long after the area was officially declared secure on 25 August 1944. The regiment conducted continuous training after being relieved by the Australian 6th Division until 10 December 1944, when the regiment loaded up and headed for Luzon.

==== Luzon ====
During the Battle of Luzon, the 169th was in charge of the left flank of the 43rd Infantry Division's advance. 2-169 landed near San Fabian on 9 January 1945 in Lingayen Gulf and advanced quickly inland. 1-169 and 3-169 followed shortly after and pressed the attack. The hills and rugged countryside of Luzon proved to be very difficult ground, and tenacious Japanese defenders made the drive painful. On 12 January, SSG Robert E. Laws (G Company, 2–169) earned the Medal of Honor for his actions while attacking an enemy controlled ridge. Neutralizing enemy pillboxes with grenades, he managed to knock it out despite being wounded. Leading a charge, he was wounded again and killed three Japanese soldiers in close combat. He was given first aid and evacuated from the area while his squad completed the destruction of the enemy position. SSG Laws' heroic actions provided great inspiration to his comrades, and his courageous determination, in the face of formidable odds and while suffering from multiple wounds, enabled them to secure an important objective with minimum casualties.

The 169th attacked numerous enemy positions, including the deadly Hill 355, and suffered many casualties, but eventually managed to take ground from the stalwart defenders. During the period of 15–21 January 1945, all three infantry battalions of the 169th Regiment earned the Distinguished Unit Citation award for their gallantry in action amid the rugged hills of Luzon. On 1–2 February, the regiment repulsed tenacious enemy Banzai charges and managed to capture the imposing Hill 1500 on 5 February, and were relieved on 14 February by elements of the 33rd Infantry Division and enjoyed some R&R behind the lines. In the early stages of the Battle of Luzon, the 169th lost 17 officers and 248 enlisted men KIA, and 45 officers and 789 enlisted men WIA. They had managed to inflict (by actual count) 2,786 Japanese dead.

On 1 March, the 169th relieved elements of the 40th Infantry Division near Clark Field and Fort Stotsenburg. The regiment was ordered to attack Hill 1750, but were thwarted by strong Japanese resistance until 6 March. The men then captured a nearby hill, Bald Hill, and held it against several enemy counterattacks on 9–10 March. During this period, the 169th Infantry Regiment was under the command of the 38th Infantry Division, and were returned to 43rd Divisional control on 24 March. On 3 April, they were attached to the 112th Cavalry Regiment to conduct reconnaissance against the formidable Shimbu Line. These recon patrols were costly, but they managed to contain the enemy in the area. On 1 May, they were returned to the 43rd Infantry Division. They then attacked the enemy in the vicinity of the Ipo Dam, which controlled roughly 30% of Manila's water supply. The dam was secured on 19 May, but resistance continued in the area until 2 June 1945. In this particular fight, the 169th suffered 60 KIA, 285 WIA, and 2 MIA, while the 43rd Infantry Division as a whole killed over 750 enemy combatants. On 5 June, the 169th relieved the 151st Infantry Regiment near Mount Oro. Nearby hills and ridges were secured against heavy enemy resistance, and the 169th continued to slog on through the island against determined defenders until 28 June 1945, when the 43rd Division was relieved by the 38th Division.

==== Occupation of Japan ====
The 169th soon found themselves as part of the US Occupation of Japan, garrisoning Kumagaya Airdrome from 14 September to 12 October. They set sail for San Francisco separately, and the last men to return home passed under the Golden Gate Bridge on 29 October 1945 to a cheering crowd. During the war, all three battalions of the 169th earned the Distinguished Unit Citation, and the Philippine Republic Presidential Unit Citation. On 1 November 1945, the regiment was inactivated.

==== World War II Decorations ====
Presidential Unit Citation (Army), Streamer embroidered LUZON (1st, 2nd, and 3rd Battalions, 169th Infantry cited; 1st Battalion: WD GO8, 1946. 2d Battalion, WD GO 38, 1946. 3d Battalion, WD GO 13, 1946)

Philippine Presidential Unit Citation, Streamer embroidered 17 OCTOBER 1944 TO 4 JULY 1945 (169th Infantry cited; DA GO 47, 1950) />

=== Post-World War II ===
The regiment was reactivated on 23 October 1946 to serve as a formation in the Connecticut National Guard in Hartford, CT. During the Korean War, the 169th Infantry Regiment was recalled to active federal service, accepting large drafts of officers and men from the Army of the United States training centers and schools building to authorized table of organization strength with and engaging in rigorous individual and collective training to achieve battle readiness for deployment overseas in the event the war escalated.

The regiment trained at Camp Pickett and Camp A. P. Hill, Virginia from October 1950 to October 1951 by which time it had achieved full establishment before deployment by troopship from Newport News, Virginia to Bremerhaven, Germany. This deployment of the parent 43rd Infantry Division and the 28th Infantry Division (Pennsylvania National Guard) to Germany was considered necessary by the Truman Administration to discourage any adventurism into Europe by the Soviet Government led by Josef Stalin. The regiment was garrisoned first around Munich then around Nürnburg. It engaged in extensive training and combat maneuvers as part of U.S. VII Corps and 7th Army as NATO built its combat and deterrence capabilities. The 169th Infantry Regiment made a major contribution to the defense of Freedom's Frontier against further Soviet encroachment into Europe.

To note, the 2nd Battalion was awarded the Golden Rifles Standard as best battalion in the 43rd Infantry Division by VII Corps Commander, Major General Withers Burress at a regimental parade at Montieth Barracks, Fürth, West Germany in 1952.

The regiment returned to Connecticut in 1954 (the regiment in place in Germany redesignated as the 39th Infantry Regiment, 9th Infantry Division). It would continue as a three battalion regiment until reorganization in the late 1950s into the 1st and 2nd Battle Groups, 169th Infantry as part of the Army's larger Pentomic reorganization. When the Army reorganized again in the early 1960s, the 1st Battle Group reorganized as the 1st Battalion, 169th Infantry and the 2nd Battle Group deactivated. The 1st Battalion would continue to serve as one of the maneuver battalions of the 43rd Infantry Brigade of the 26th Infantry Division until 1992 when, as the regiment's last organized combat battalion, it inactivated and many of the battalion's personnel were incorporated into the 242nd Combat Engineer Battalion. The regiment continues to serve as the Connecticut Army National Guard's 169th Regiment (Regional Training Institute).
