= 45th =

45th is the ordinal form of the number 45. 45th or Forty-fifth may also refer to:

- A fraction, 1/45, equal to one of 45 equal parts

== Geography ==
- 45th meridian east, a line of longitude
- 45th meridian west, a line of longitude
- 45th parallel north, a circle of latitude
- 45th parallel south, a circle of latitude
- 45th Street station (disambiguation)

== Military ==
- 45th Army
- 45th Brigade (disambiguation)
- 45th Division (disambiguation)
- 45th Regiment (disambiguation)
- 45th Squadron (disambiguation)

== Other ==
- 45th century
- 45th century BC

== See also ==
- 45 (disambiguation)
