= 45th Cavalry =

45th Cavalry may refer to:

- 45th Cavalry (India)
- 45th Arkansas Infantry (Mounted), sometimes referred to as the 45th Arkansas Cavalry
- 45th (Dublin Hunt) Company, Imperial Yeomanry

== See also ==
- 45th Division (disambiguation)
- 45th Brigade (disambiguation)
- 45th Regiment (disambiguation)
- 45th (disambiguation)
