= 450 (disambiguation) =

450 may refer to:

== In general ==
- 450 (number), a number in the 400s range
- 450 AD (CDL, CCCCL), a year in the Common Era
- 450s AD, a decade in the Common Era
- 450 BC, a year Before the Common Era
- 450s BC, a decade Before the Common Era

== Places ==
- Highway 450, any of several highways numbered 450; see List of highways numbered 450
- Area code 450, a telephone area code for the off-island suburbs of Montreal, Quebec, Canada
- 450 Brigitta (Asteroid #450) the asteroid Brigitta, the 450th asteroid registered
- Shawnee Heights USD 450, Tecumseh, Kansas, USA; unified school district #459

== .450 calibre ammunition ==
- .450 Ackley Magnum, rifle longarm ammo
- .450 Adams, revolver handgun ammo
- .450 Black Powder Express, rifle longarm ammo
- .450 Bushmaster, rifle longarm ammo
- .450 Marlin, rifle longarm ammo
- .450 Nitro Express, rifle longarm ammo
- .450 No 2 Nitro Express, rifle longarm ammo
- .450 Revolver, handgun ammo
- .450 Rigby, rifle longarm ammo

== Military units ==
- No. 450 Squadron RAAF, Royal Australian Air Force
- 450 Tactical Helicopter Squadron, Royal Canadian Air Force
- No. 450 (Fleet Spotter Reconnaissance) Flight FAA, British Royal Navy Fleet Air Arm

=== Ships with the pennant number ===
- USS LST-450, U.S. Navy WWII landing ship for tanks
- USS Joseph E. Connolly (DE-450), U.S. Navy WWII Butler-class destroyer escort
- USS O'Bannon (DD-450), U.S. Navy WWII Fletcher-class destroyer
- USS Pinafore (SP-450), an early 20th-century U.S. Navy launch
- German submarine U-450, German WWII Kriegsmarine U-boat

== Transportation and vehicles ==
- Allison 450, a jet engine
- Ather 450, an electric scooter
- Alfa Romeo 450, an Italian cab-over truck
- Boeing Model 450, a jet bomber
- Bristol 450, a British racing sports car
- Citroën 450, a French cab-over truck
- Ducati 450 Mark 3, a single-cylinder motorcycle engine
  - Ducati 450 Scrambler, a single-cylinder motorcycle
  - Ducati 450 R/T, a single-cylinder off-road motorcycle
- Farmall 450, a U.S. farm tractor
- Gulfstream 450, a business jet
- KTM 450 EXC, an off-road motorcycle
  - KTM 450 Rally, a rally raid motorcycle
- Mercedes-Benz 450 (disambiguation), several different car models produced under Mercedes-Benz
- Potez 450, a French flying boat
- Skoda 450, a Czechoslovak small family car
- Subaru 450, a Japanese city car
- TVR 450 SEAC, a British sports car
- UAZ-450, a Soviet off-road van
- Route 450 (MBTA), a bus route in Massachusetts, US

== Other uses ==
- Prime 450, a minicomputer
- Scooba 450, a pool robot

== See also ==
- Inex-Adria Aviopromet Flight 450 (1975)
- 450th (disambiguation)
- Class 450 (disambiguation)
- E-450 (disambiguation)
- S450 (disambiguation)
- CDL (disambiguation); 450 in Roman Numerals
- 45 (disambiguation)
