= 45th Army =

45th Army may refer to:

- 45th Army (People's Republic of China)
- 45th Air and Air Defence Forces Army, Russia
- 45th Army (Soviet Union)

== See also ==
- List of armies by number
- 45th Division (disambiguation)
- 45th Brigade (disambiguation)
- 45th Regiment (disambiguation)
- 45th Squadron (disambiguation)
- 45th (disambiguation)
