= Pinafore (disambiguation) =

A pinafore is a sleeveless garment worn as an apron.

Pinafore may also refer to:

- Pinafore dress, sleeveless, collarless dress intended to be worn over a blouse, shirt or sweater
- Pinaforing, forced cross-dressing for erotic purposes
- H.M.S. Pinafore, Gilbert and Sullivan opera
- USS Pinafore (SP-450), United States Navy launch in commission from 1902 to 1920
- Pinafore (software), a web client for Mastodon (software) designed for speed and simplicity
