= E450 =

E450 or E-450 may refer to:

- E450 (food additive)
- E-450, a Ford E-Series van or minibus
- Olympus E-450, a camera
- ThinkPad E450, laptop
- E450, a model variant of the Mercedes-Benz E-Class (W213)
- E-450, an AMD processor with 3D graphics
- E450 series, a Sony Walkman digital audio player, see Walkman E Series

== See also ==
- Sun Enterprise 450, a Sun Enterprise server computer
- Canon EOS 450D, a camera
- 450 (disambiguation)
