= S450 =

S450 may refer to:

- Canon S450, a Canon S Series digital camera
- PV-S450, a Casio Pocket Viewer PDA model
- S 450 model of the Mercedes-Benz S-Class
- S450, a model of motor yacht manufactured by Sealine
- Empire Farringdon (S450), an Empire Ship built by Henry Scarr

== See also ==
- 450 (disambiguation)
