= Building the Education Revolution =

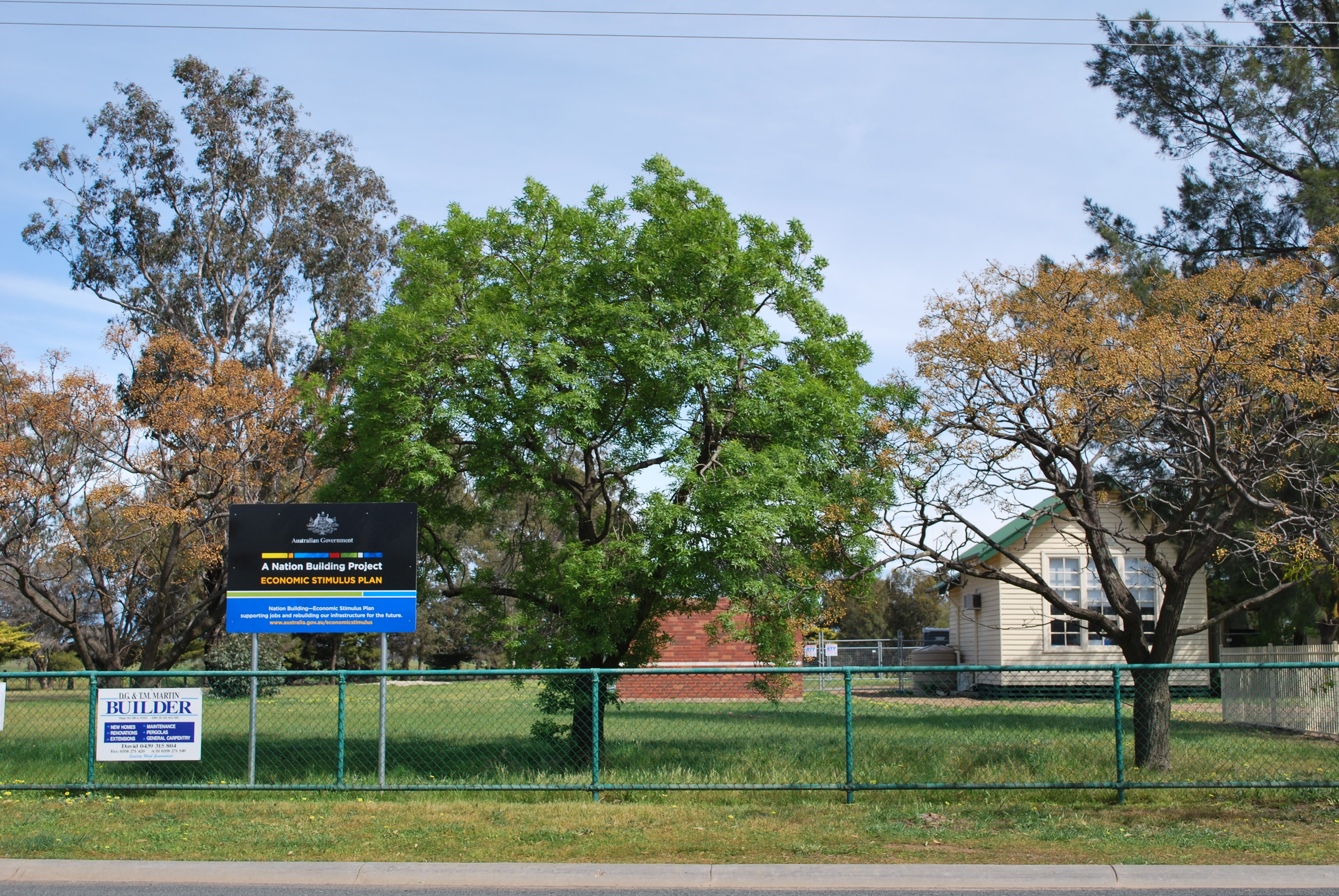
A primary school in Kialla, Victoria, with signage identifying works funded by the Building the Education Revolution component of the economic stimulus plan.

The value (in $'000s) of monthly approvals for educational buildings in Australia since July 2000. The spike leading up to 2010 corresponds to the BER program.

Building the Education Revolution (BER) was an Australian government program administered by the Department of Education, Employment and Workplace Relations (DEEWR) designed to provide new and refurbished infrastructure to all eligible Australian schools. The program was part of the Rudd government's economic stimulus package designed as a response to the 2008 financial crisis.

The program, totaling A$16.2 billion has three elements:

- Primary Schools for the 21st Century ($14.2b): providing new and refurbished halls, libraries and classrooms
- Science and Language Centres for 21st Century Secondary Schools ($821.8m): providing new and refurbished science laboratories and language learning centres
- National School Pride program ($1.28b): providing new and refurbished covered outdoor learning areas, shade structures, sporting facilities and other environmental programs.

== Controversy ==
The program has attracted attention from critics for alleged "rorting" (misappropriation of public funds) and for not delivering value-for-money outcomes. Instances of inflated quotes or new buildings that were not particularly useful to the school were reported. The Leader of the Opposition Tony Abbott called for a judicial inquiry into the BER and the Home Insulation Program, described by the opposition Liberal Party as "failed programs" and a "waste of public money".

In April 2010, the government announced the formation of the BER Implementation Taskforce "to ensure projects are providing value for money". Deputy Prime Minister of Australia Julia Gillard defended the BER saying that it was "already one of the most heavily scrutinised programs in the nation's history" and that the program was the "centerpiece" of an economic stimulus package that helped to "ensure that a generation of Australians weren't consigned to months or years of joblessness".

After the 2010 election BER moved under the portfolio of Senator Chris Evans.

The Taskforce, headed by Brad Orgill, former chairman and chief executive of UBS Australasia, delivered its report to Senator Evans on 15 December 2010. The report found that most of BER projects had been successfully delivered, with only 3% of the schools involved in the program making complaints. Projects in NSW received the most complaints. The third and final report by Brad Orgill found that BER projects in NSW, QLD and VIC overpaid for buildings by more than 25% on average compared to Catholic schools and more than 55% compared to independent schools.

However, the ANAO investigation into the project ruled that comparison with those projects were not valid as the standards applied to government school facilities were higher.

On 25 March 2014 three Australian academics published a paper in the International Journal of Public Administration that argued that the BER program represents a "'case study' of how governments should not pursue large-scale public expenditure programs". The paper says that the BER illustrates the pitfalls of large-scale public expenditure programs, and that it did not provide value for money. However, one of its authors subsequently noted that the "paper did indicate that most jurisdictions and school systems were successful".

== See also ==
- Digital Education Revolution
- Department of Education, Employment and Workplace Relations
