= Digital Education Revolution =

Australian Government digital technology in schools policy from 2009–2012

DER logo

The Digital Education Revolution (DER) was an Australian government–funded educational reform program, promised by then prime minister of Australia Kevin Rudd during the launch of his 2007 Australian federal election campaign in Brisbane. It was officially launched in late 2008, with the first deployments announced by then Deputy Prime Minister of Australia and Minister for Education, Employment and Workplace Relations, Julia Gillard and then New South Wales counterpart, Verity Firth. The first deployment took place at Fairvale High School in August that year.

== Aim ==
Through the program, the government would allocate A$2.4 billion over seven years to:

- provide laptops to all public high school students in years 9–12 through the National Secondary School Computer Fund
- deploy high speed broadband to all Australian schools and quality digital tools, resources and infrastructure that will help support the Australian Curriculum
- support increase in information and communication technology (ICT) proficiency for teachers and students throughout Australia to nourish the use of ICT in teaching and learning
- develop projects and research that will assist and support the use of ICT in learning
- enable parents to participate in their child's education through online learning and access
- support mechanisms that will provide assistance to schools in ICT deployment

== Deployment ==
In September 2008, amidst uncertainty over extra costs involved with the computers, the Government of New South Wales rejected an offer for extra funding from the Commonwealth Government. The State Government requested additional funds to cover servicing, technical support, upgraded power supplies, software licensing, security and teacher training associated with installing the computers. After failing to secure assistance, the State Government then requested an extension to the 9 October deadline, for applications in the second round of funding. After being denied an extension, the State Government said it had been forced to refuse the offer until the extent of its financial situation was clarified in the 2008 mini-budget.

The Director-General for Education, Michael Coutts-Trotter, told The Sydney Morning Herald: "We can't commit at this stage until we can be sure the full cost of implementing the computers can be met. But we are enthusiastic about the program and as soon as the funding is sorted out, we will apply in the third round." The Minister for Education and Training Verity Firth said she expected the State Government to resolve the funding issue ahead of the second round of funding. "NSW can't commit to any infrastructure ahead of the mini-budget," said Firth, "It would be unfair to schools and students to seek new computers only to find that there was insufficient funding for their operating costs from the federal Government" .

In November 2008, after negotiations with the Commonwealth Government at the Council of Australian Governments (COAG), then Premier of New South Wales Nathan Rees and the Government of New South Wales secured A$807 million to provide every year 9–12 public high school student with a laptop. The laptops, loaded with A$5,500 worth of programs from the latest Microsoft Office Suite and Adobe Suite, are provided by computer company, Lenovo under a four-year contract secured by the state government.

On 26 August 2009 the Deputy Prime Minister of Australia and Minister for Education, Employment and Workplace Relations, Julia Gillard and New South Wales Minister for Education and Training, Verity Firth announced the delivery of the first laptops to secondary schools in New South Wales. Gillard and Firth visited a Year 9 class at Fairvale High School in Sydney's west to witness the integration of laptops into the lesson.

In February 2010, the Queensland Department of Education, Training and Employment chief information officer David O'Hagan said that there was a possibility the iPad could complement laptops used in public high schools in Queensland, "When it [the iPad] becomes available in Australia, the [Queensland] Department of Education and Training will conduct an evaluation to determine its suitability for teaching and learning as well as network compatibility, schools eligible for computers under the federal government's National Secondary School Computer Fund also use this central purchasing arrangement to buy desktop and laptop computers." he said. Apple is a member of the panel of computer suppliers for Queensland state (public) schools (primary and secondary).

== Laptops ==
In New South Wales, students were issued with Lenovo laptops no bigger than a sheet of A4 paper. In 2009, the model issued was the IdeaPad S10e, in 2010, the ThinkPad Mini 10, in 2011, the ThinkPad Edge 11, in 2012 the ThinkPad X130e which was uniquely designed and in 2013, the ThinkPad X131e. The laptops also came with pre-installed software, such as Adobe CS5, Adobe LiveCycle ES2, Microsoft Office 2010, and Microsoft Forefront. In June 2010 a recall of laptop cases was issued after it was found that there was a flaw in the design of the case when several students reported that their screens had cracks. The New South Wales Department of Education and Training's chief information officer Stephen Wilson said that the filtering system on the laptops is impervious, and no student will be able to break through the system. "Our internet filtering is unbreakable. We have a huge proxy array that does all the filtering. We've just brought that in-house and the reason we have done that is we want much tighter control over it, every internet site that's known is actually categorised. If it isn't known, it's blocked. If you go to a site, and it's not categorised you can't get to it," said Wilson.

With the termination of federal government funding commitments, the New South Wales Department of Education and Communities has adopted a formal "Bring Your Own Device" policy approach to laptops and tablet devices.

== Criticism ==
In 2008, letters were leaked that revealed that the Minister of Education, Employment and Workplace Relations Julia Gillard was told that the policy was not thought through and severely underfunded. There were concerns that the lack of funds would be compensated for by financially crippled families or some computers left in boxes, unopened. The states were noncompliant upon learning that each would have to contribute up to A$3 billion altogether, a contribution that was not mentioned by Rudd or Gillard in the election campaign.

In 2010, the Rudd Government was again criticised for being too slow to deliver after it was confirmed that "none of the A$100 million budgeted to bring high-speed broadband to schools had been spent". Rudd blamed the delay in delivering broadband to schools on the recession and its impact on government finances.

In August that same year, only 220,000 of the 1 million promised laptops had been delivered. Further setbacks were due in part because of the government's focus on the A$43 billion National Broadband Network.

== See also ==
- Building the Education Revolution
- Department of Education, Employment and Workplace Relations
- Education in Australia
