= Class 450 =

Class 450 may refer to:

- British Rail Class 450, an electric multiple unit type operated by South Western Railway
- NIR Class 450, a diesel multiple unit type operated by Northern Ireland Railways
- RENFE Class 450

== See also ==
- FS Class ETR 450
- 450 (disambiguation)
