= Mercedes-Benz 450 =

Mercedes-Benz has sold a number of automobiles with the "450" model name:

- 1972–1980 R107
  - 1972–1980 450SLC
  - 1973–1980 450SL
- 1973–1979 W116
  - 1973–1976 450SE
  - 1974–1980 450SEL
