= 45th Commando Brigade =

Ground Force Unit of the Islamic Republic of Iran Army

The 45th Commando Brigade (Persian: تیپ ۴۵ تکاور), also known as the 45th Rapid Reaction Special Force Brigade (Persian: تیپ ۴۵ نیرومخصوص واکنش سریع), is one of the commando brigades of the Islamic Republic of Iran Army Ground Forces. Its headquarters is located in the city of Shushtar, Khuzestan, Iran. Members and soldiers of this brigade are trained in parachuting, diving, commando operations, hostage rescue, special operations, and sniping. During the Iran–Iraq War, this brigade was one of the active ground force units, and 122 of its members were killed in action throughout the conflict.

The nickname of this brigade is Green Berets. This brigade operates with around 3,000 personnel under the command of Colonel Mohammad Ebrahimi and is loyal to the Islamic Republic of Iran Armed Forces. The 45th Brigade is part of the Islamic Republic of Iran Army and is supported by the Southwest Regional Headquarters of the Islamic Republic of Iran Army Ground Forces. The brigade's official parade is held every year on April 18, on the occasion of Army Day. One of the notable commanders of this brigade is Brigadier general Hamid Abbasnejad.

This Brigade is a rapid reaction combat unit that deploys to the western borders of Khuzestan whenever deemed necessary by the command headquarters. Units of the 45th Commando Brigade are stationed across the region from Dehloran to Hoveyzeh, maintaining military and security oversight of the country’s southern borders.
