= 45 =

45 may refer to:

- 45 (number), the natural number following 44 and preceding 46
- one of the years 45 BC, AD 45, 1945, 2045

== Arts and entertainment ==
=== Film ===
- 45 (2009 film), a short psychological thriller
- 45 (2025 film), a Kannada-language action fantasy film
- .45 (film), a 2006 American independent thriller film

=== Music ===
- 45 rpm record or 45, a common form of vinyl single
- 45 (Jaguares album), 2008
- 45 (Kino album), 1982
- "45" (Elvis Costello song), 2002
- "45" (The Gaslight Anthem song), 2012
- "45" (Shinedown song), 2003
- "45", a song by Bon Iver from the 2016 album 22, A Million
- "Forty Five", a song by Karma to Burn from the 2010 album Appalachian Incantation

=== Other uses in arts and entertainment ===
- 45 (book), by Bill Drummond, 2000
- Forty-five, a Doctor Who anthology audio drama

== Other uses ==
- .45, the diameter in inches of several 11 mm caliber firearm cartridges
  - Colt .45 caliber, the M1911 pistol
  - .45 calibre Colt Single Action Army revolver
- Donald Trump, the 45th and 47th president of the United States
- Jacobite rising of 1745, or "The '45", in Scotland and England
- Forty-fives, a card game
- Fortyfive, a software development company
- Rover 45, a small family car (1999–2005)

== See also ==
- 45th (disambiguation)
