= 45th Infantry Regiment (Imperial Japanese Army) =

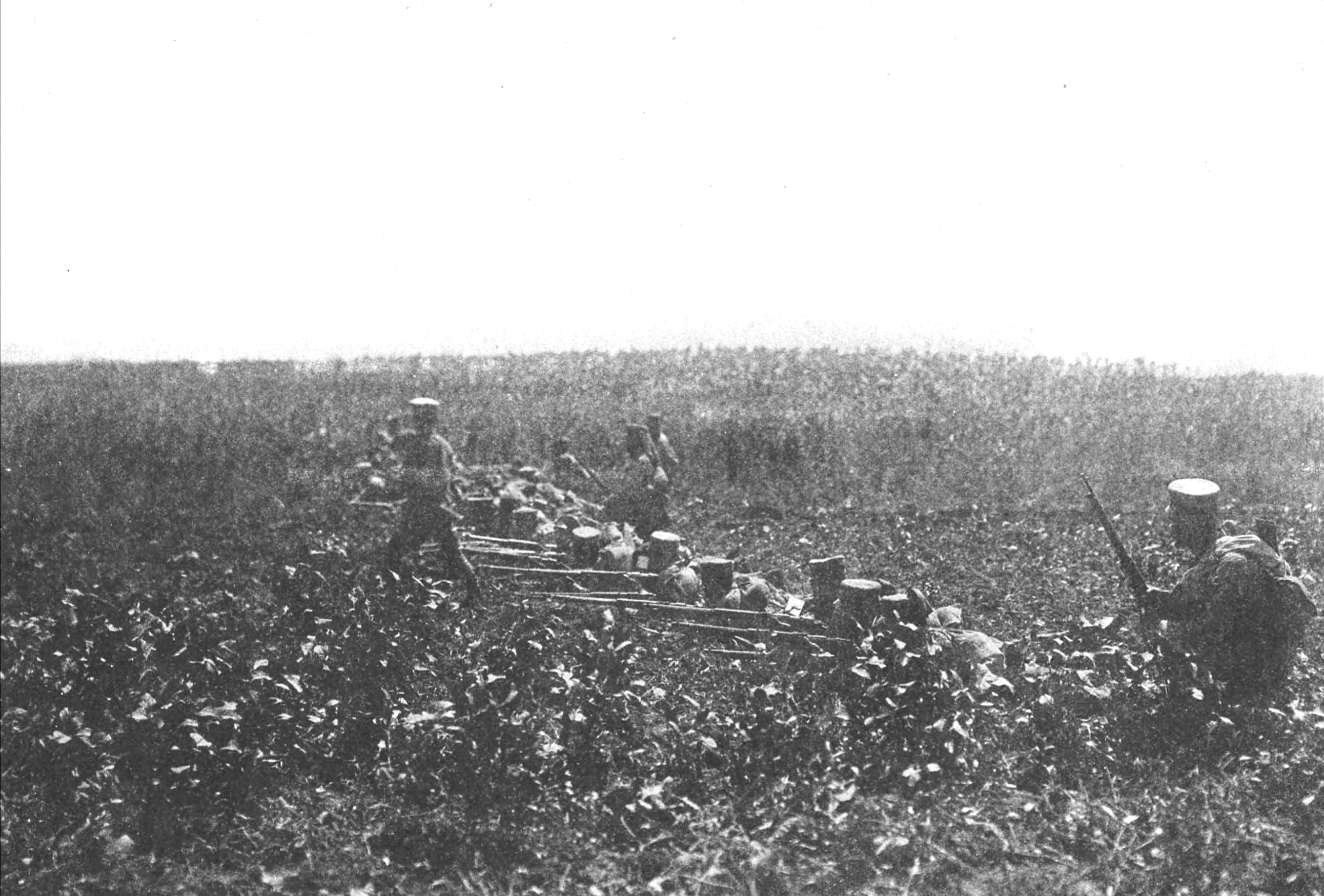
- Country: Japan
- Branch: Army
- Type: Regiment
- Role: Infantry
- Engagements: Second Sino-Japanese War

The 45th Infantry Regiment was an infantry regiment in the Imperial Japanese Army. The regiment was attached to the 6th Infantry Brigade of the 6th Division and participated during the Second Sino-Japanese War. The regiment fought in the later stages of World War II, assigned to the Japanese Seventeenth Army at Bougainville Island in the Solomon Islands.

== Organization ==
- 1st Battalion
- 2nd Battalion
- 3rd Battalion
