= ThinkPad E series =

Series of laptops by Lenovo

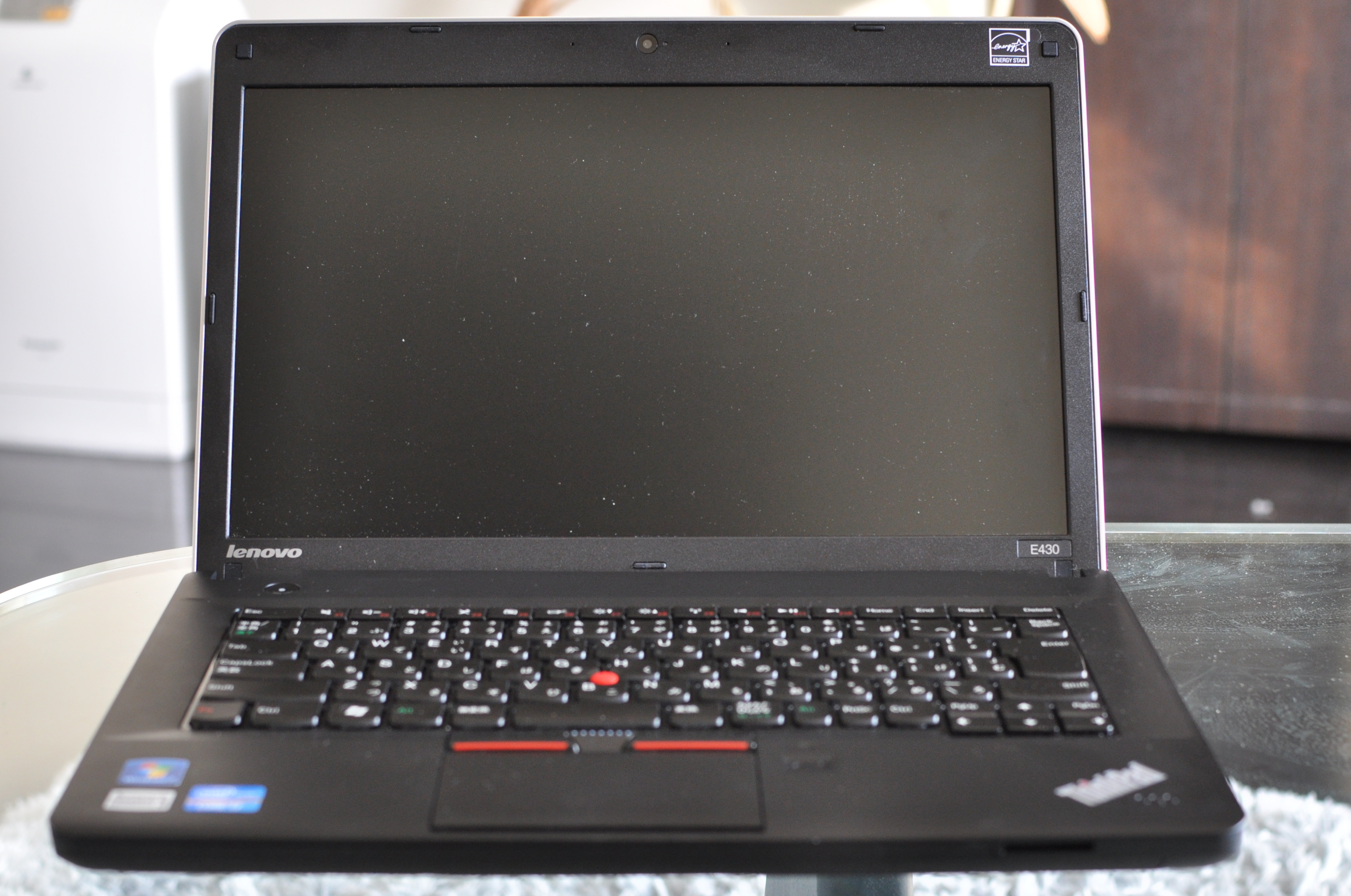
- ThinkPad E430
- Also known as: ThinkPad Edge
- Developer: Lenovo (2010–present)
- Type: Low-cost business Laptop, Subnotebook (Edge 11, E1##)
- Released: April 2010
- Predecessor: Thinkpad SL series ThinkPad R series

The ThinkPad E Series (formerly ThinkPad Edge) is a notebook computer series produced since 2010 by Lenovo. It is the most affordable sibling in the ThinkPad family and is aimed at small business users as well as education markets.

== Launch and reviews ==
The Edge series of ThinkPad computers was introduced at the 2010 International CES in Las Vegas and became available for sale in April of the same year. It was initially marketed to small and medium-sized businesses.

For the ThinkPad Edge 13, a review on Engadget said that even though, "it may not carry the premium features of [Lenovo Thinkpad] X301..., but for a budget ultraportable... [there is] little to complain about." Engadget also tested the battery life of the Edge 13 and discovered that "Lenovo's battery life prediction of seven hours is pretty on the mark." The Edge 13's battery lasted 5 hours and 12 minutes.

Laptop Magazine reviewed the ThinkPad Edge 14 and found it was "the most compelling 14-inch small business notebook on the market today."

NotebookReview reviewed the ThinkPad Edge 15 and said that its "build quality seems to be a step down from the 13 and 14 inch." The website also mentioned that the Edge series in general "feels under built...[and] the Edge 15 fares much worse".

Reviews of the E220s and E420s were more positive, citing better build quality than other models in the Edge line.

== Features ==
The ThinkPad Edge series uses processors from both AMD and Intel. AMD processors offered include the Athlon II dual-core, the Turion II Dual-core, Phenom II Triple-core and Ryzen 2nd, 3rd, 4th and 5th Generation mobile Accelerated Processing Units (APUs). Intel processors used include the Core 2 Duo, Core i3, Core i5 and Core i7.

Voice Over IP (VoIP) features including high resolution cameras and an HD LED screen are also included. All four models offer a glossy LED back-lit 16:9 display capable of playing 720p video. However the Edge 11 and 13 does not include an optical drive. The laptops came in three colors: Midnight Black (Smooth), Midnight Black (Gloss), and Heatwave Red (Gloss).

== Design ==
Lenovo designed the laptops to "reflect a new progressive and strikingly clean appearance while retaining ThinkPad durability and reliability". For example, along with the new Island-style keyboard, the Edge series had some keyboard design changes: uniform black keys and the removal of the embedded number pad. The Function keys were re-designed so users could use one finger to access functions such as multimedia keys. Some keys which were rarely used like SysRq were removed.

== Models ==
Battery configuration

Main	M(x)	Main hot-swappable (max.cells)	Secondary	U	Ultrabay removable
Main	M(x)	Main hot-swappable (max.cells)	Secondary	u	Ultrabay unremovable
Main	M(x)	Main removable (max.cells)	Secondary	m(x)	internal (max.cells) "PowerBridge"
Main	m(x)	Main internal (max.cells)	Secondary	S	Slice battery

Laptop color codes

Processor

Socketed desktop processor
Socketed mobile processor
Soldered high power processor
Soldered standard power processor
Soldered low power processor
Soldered ultra low power processor

Weight

0.9 kg (2.0 lb)	Up to 0.91 kg
1.0 kg (2.2 lb)	0.92–1.0 kg
1.1 kg (2.4 lb)	1.01–1.1 kg
1.2 kg (2.6 lb)	1.11–1.2 kg
1.3 kg (2.9 lb)	1.21–1.3 kg
1.4 kg (3.1 lb)	1.31–1.4 kg
1.5 kg (3.3 lb)	1.41–1.5 kg
1.6 kg (3.5 lb)	1.51–1.6 kg
1.7 kg (3.7 lb)	1.61–1.7 kg
1.8 kg (4.0 lb)	1.71–1.81 kg
1.9 kg (4.2 lb)	1.81–1.91 kg
2.0 kg (4.4 lb)	1.91–2.03 kg
2.1 kg (4.6 lb)	2.04–2.14 kg
2.3 kg (5.1 lb)	2.15–2.4 kg
2.5 kg (5.5 lb)	2.41–2.75 kg
2.8 kg (6.2 lb)	2.76–3.05 kg
3.1 kg (6.8 lb)	3.06–3.42 kg
3.5 kg (7.7 lb)	3.43–3.99 kg
4.0 kg (8.8 lb)	4.0–4.99 kg
5.5 kg (12 lb)	5.0–6.49 kg
7.2 kg (16 lb)	6.5–7.99 kg
9.1 kg (20 lb)	8.0–9.99 kg
10.7 kg (24 lb)	10–11.99 kg
12.7 kg (28 lb)	12–14.49 kg
14.5 kg (32 lb)	14.5–17.99 kg
18.1 kg (40 lb)	18–20.99 kg
21.7 kg (48 lb)	21–23.99 kg
24 kg (53 lb)	24–28.99 kg
29.5 kg (65 lb)	29 kg and above

Screen resolution

4K or higher
1440p+ (WQHD, QXGA)
1080p+ (Full HD, UXGA)
Better than 768p (SXGA,SXGA+)
600p+ (SVGA, HD, XGA, HD+)
Up to 600p (VGA)

Graphics

Dual standard socket graphics option
Dual proprietary socket graphics option
Standard socket graphics option
Proprietary socket graphics option
Soldered performance graphics option
Soldered midrange graphics option
Soldered mainstream graphics option
Soldered entry graphics option
Integrated entry graphics
Integrated basic graphics

Laptop storage combinations (excluding WWAN slot)

Level	PCIe 4.0 x4	PCIe 3.0 x4	PCIe 3.0 x2	M.2 SATA	mSATA	1.8" SATA	2.5" SATA	1.8" IDE	2.5" IDE
	2019; Not yet (laptops)	2013	2013	2013	2009	2003	2003	1991	1988
	3						2		
	4								
	3						1		
	2						2		
	3					2			
	3								
	2						1		
	4								
	3					1			
	2					2			
	2								
	1						1		
	3								
	2					1			
	1								
	2								
	1					1			
			2				1		
							4		
		1							
			1				1		
							3		
			1						
				1			1		
					1		1		
						1	1		
							2		
									3
						1			
							1		
									2
								1	
									1

Laptop memory

Amount	LPDDR5X	LPDDR5	DDR5	LPDDR4X	LPDDR4	DDR4	LPDDR3	DDR4	DDR3L		DDR3		DDR2		DDR	SDR	EDO	FPM
Amount						dual channel		< dual channel	dual channel	< dual channel	dual channel	< dual channel	dual channel	< dual channel				
Amount	2022 (laptops)	2019 (laptops)	2020	2017	2014	2014	2012	2014	2010		2007		2003		1998	1993	1993	1987
max memory = 512 GB	N/A	N/A	512 GB	N/A	N/A	N/A	N/A	N/A	N/A	N/A	N/A	N/A	N/A	N/A	N/A	N/A	N/A	N/A
max memory = 256 GB	N/A		256 GB (4 slots)	N/A	N/A	N/A	N/A	N/A	N/A	N/A	N/A	N/A	N/A	N/A	N/A	N/A	N/A	N/A
max memory = 128 GB	128 GB		128 GB	N/A	N/A	128 GB (4 slots)	N/A	N/A	N/A	N/A	N/A	N/A	N/A	N/A	N/A	N/A	N/A	N/A
64 GB ≤ max memory < 128 GB		64 GB		N/A	N/A	64 GB	N/A	64 GB (2 slots)	64 GB (4 slots)	N/A	N/A	N/A	N/A	N/A	N/A	N/A	N/A	N/A
32 GB ≤ max memory < 64 GB				32 GB	32 GB	32 GB	N/A		32 GB	32 GB (2 slots)	32 GB (4 slots)	N/A	N/A	N/A	N/A	N/A	N/A	N/A
16 GB ≤ max memory < 32 GB						16 GB	16 GB		16 GB		16 GB	16 GB (2 slots)	16 GB (4 slots)	N/A	N/A	N/A	N/A	N/A
8 GB ≤ max memory < 16 GB						8 GB			8 GB		8 GB		8 GB	8 GB (2 slots)	8 GB (4 slots)	N/A	N/A	N/A
4 GB ≤ max memory < 8 GB						4 GB			4 GB		4 GB		4 GB		4 GB	4 GB (4 slots)	4 GB (4 slots)	N/A
2 GB ≤ max memory < 4 GB						2 GB (8 chips)			2 GB		2 GB		2 GB			2 GB	2 GB	N/A
1 GB ≤ max memory < 2 GB			1 GB (1 chip)	dual channel min	dual channel min	N/A		single channel min	1 GB		1 GB		1 GB					1 GB (4 slots)
512 MB ≤ max memory < 1 GB	N/A	N/A	N/A	single channel min	single channel min	N/A	dual channel min	half channel min	512 MB (8 chips)		512 MB (8 chips)		512 MB					512 MB
256 MB ≤ max memory < 512 MB	N/A	N/A	N/A	256 MB (1 chip)	256 MB (1 chip)	N/A	single channel min	256 MB (1 chip)	N/A	single channel min	N/A	single channel min	256 MB					
128 MB ≤ max memory < 256 MB	N/A	N/A	N/A	N/A	N/A	N/A	128 MB (1 chip)	N/A	N/A	half channel min	N/A	half channel min						
64 MB ≤ max memory < 128 MB	N/A	N/A	N/A	N/A	N/A	N/A	N/A	N/A	N/A	64 MB (1 chip)	N/A	64 MB (1 chip)						
max memory < 64 MB	N/A	N/A	N/A	N/A	N/A	N/A	N/A	N/A	N/A	N/A	N/A	N/A						

ThinkPad Edge/E series (2010-2023) ThinkPad S series (2012-2014) ThinkPad R series (China exclusive, 2018-present?)
Screen	Type	Edge 1* (2010)	E*2* (2011)		E*3* S*3* (2012)			E*4* S*4* (2013)		E*5* (2014)	E*6* (2015)		E*7* (2016)		R*8* E*8* (2017)		R*8* E*9* (2018)		2019	2020	2021	2022	2023	2024	2025
Screen	Type	Edge 1* (2010)	Intel	AMD	Intel		AMD	Intel	AMD	Intel	Intel	AMD	Intel	AMD	Intel	AMD	Intel	AMD	2019	2020	2021	2022	2023	2024	2025
11.6"	Subnotebook	Edge 11	E120	E125	E130		E135	replaced by 11e																	
12.5"	Slim		E220s																						
12.5"	Convertible				S230u (Twist)		replaced by Yoga 240																		
13.3"	Mainstream	Edge 13	E320	E325	E330		E335						replaced by 13												
14"	Mainstream	Edge 14	E420	E425	E430	E431	E435	E440	E445	E450	E460	E465	E470	E475	E480	E485	E490	E495	E14; Gen1	E14; Gen2	E14; Gen3	E14; Gen4	E14; Gen5	E14; Gen6	E14 Gen7
14"	Mainstream		E420s		S430	S431		S440							R480		R490		R14; Gen1	R14; Gen2					
15.6"	Mainstream	Edge 15	E520	E525	E530	E531	E535	E540	E545	E550	E560	E565	E570	E575	E580	E585	E590	E595	E15; Gen1	E15; Gen2	E15; Gen3	E15; Gen4	replaced by E16		
15.6"	Mainstream				S530	S531		S540							R580		R590		R15; Gen1	R15; Gen2					
16"	Mainstream																						E16; Gen1	E16; Gen2	

=== Gen 1 (2010) ===
==== Edge 11 ====
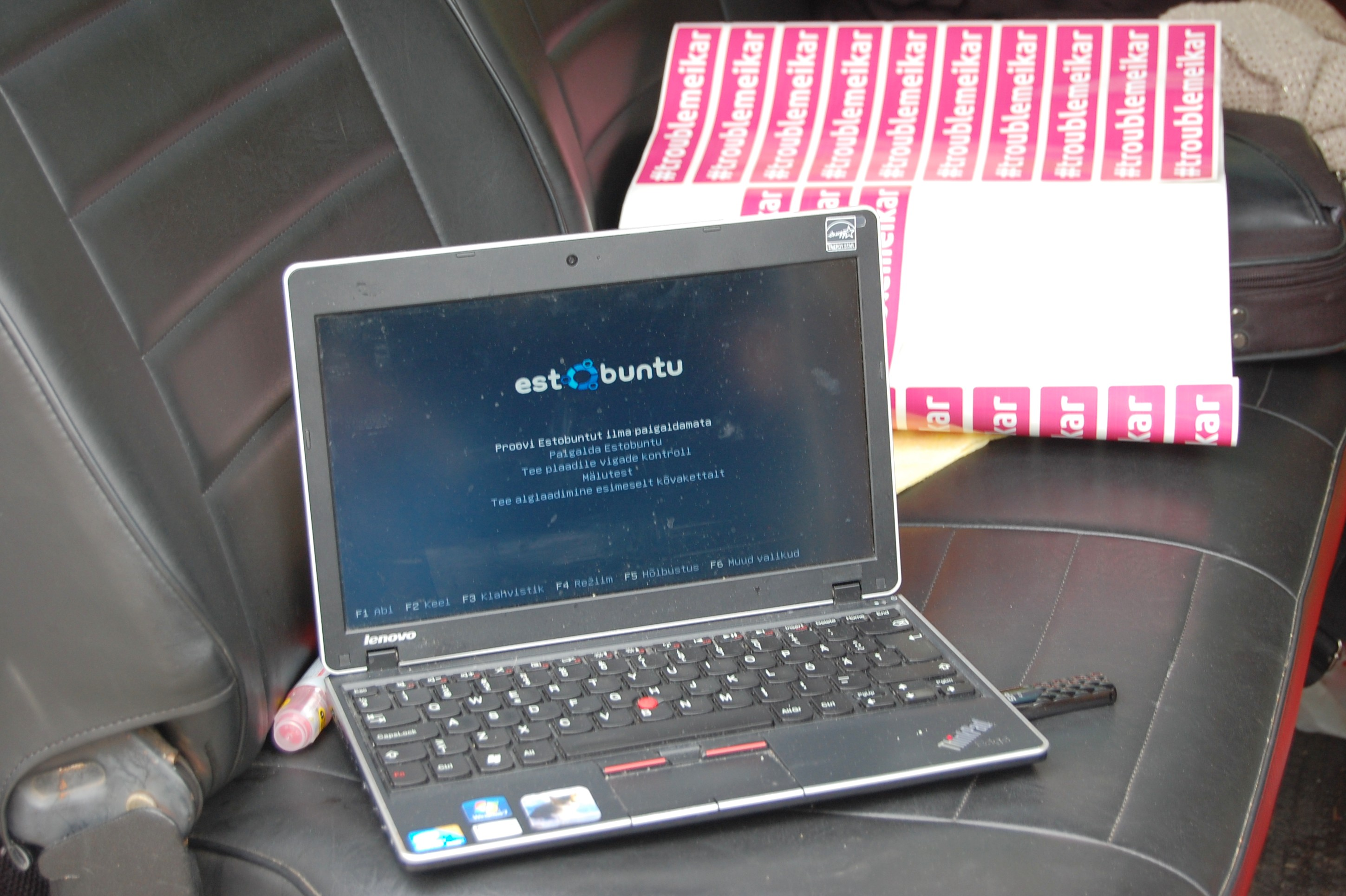
Edge 11 booting Estobuntu

The ThinkPad Edge 11 laptop was not released in the United States, with the X100e serving as an 11.6-inch laptop solution in the US. The laptop was 1.1 inches thick and weighed 3.3 lbs. Like other laptops in the series, the Edge 11 was made available in glossy black, matte black and glossy red. Despite the low starting price, the Edge 11 laptop included some of the traditional ThinkPad durability features, including solid metal hinges. The battery life was better than both the IdeaPad U160 and the ThinkPad X100e laptops.

Edge 11 (DER Special Edition). A special edition laptop was provided for Australian Year 9 students as part of the Digital Education Revolution (DER) program in 2011.

Edge 11 specifications:
- Processor: Intel Core i3-380UM or AMD Athlon Neo X2
- Operating system: Microsoft Windows 7 Home Premium
- Display: 11.6" Glossy (1366×768) TN
- Graphics: Intel GMA 4500MHD or ATI Mobility Radeon HD 4225
- Color: Midnight Black (Glossy, Matte), Heatwave Red (Glossy)
- RAM: up to 4 GB DDR3 1067 MHz (2 slots)
- Storage: 320 GB 5,400 rpm SATA HDD
- Networking: 10/100/1000 Ethernet; Integrated Wireless 802.11abgn
- Battery: 6- or 9-Cell Li-On (swappable)
DER Special Edition specifications:
- Processor: Intel Celeron U3400
- Operating system: Microsoft Windows 7 Enterprise
- Display: 11.6" Glossy (1366×768) TN
- Intel HM55 Chipset 500 MHz Graphics
- Color: Midnight Black (Glossy, Matte), Rainforest Green (Glossy)
- RAM: 2 GB DDR3 1333 MHz (2 slots)
- Storage: 160 GB 5,400 rpm SATA HDD
- Networking: 10/100/1000 Ethernet; Broadcom 2x2 802.11abgn Wireless; BT 3.0
- Battery: 6- or 9-Cell Li-Ion (swappable)

==== Edge 13 ====
The ThinkPad Edge 13 laptop was released on January 5, 2010. It was 1.2 inches thick, weighed 3.5 lbs (1.6 kg), and fit into a backpack. The Edge 13 laptop was capable of handling Windows 7 Pro with ease, with multiple applications like Firefox, Microsoft Word 2007, GIMP, TweetDeck, and iTunes at the same time. It did not feature Intel's Arrandale platform on release, and was launched with a prior generation CULV processor. The lack of processing speed, however, was compensated by a gain in battery life. The laptop delivered 6 hours and 58 minutes of battery life in MobileMark 2007 tests.

Specifications:

- Processor: Intel Core 2 Duo SU7300 or Core i3-380UM or AMD Athlon Neo X2 L325
- Operating system: Microsoft Windows 7 Home Premium
- Display: 13.3" Glossy (1366×768) TN
- Graphics: Intel GMA 4500MHD
- Color: Midnight Black (Glossy, Matte), Heatwave Red (Glossy)
- RAM: up to 8 GB DDR3 (1066 MHz) (2 slots)
- Storage: 250 GB 5,400 rpm SATA HDD
- Networking: 10/100 Ethernet; Integrated Wireless 802.11abgn
- Battery: 4- or 6--Cell Li-Ion (swappable)

==== Edge 14 and 15 ====
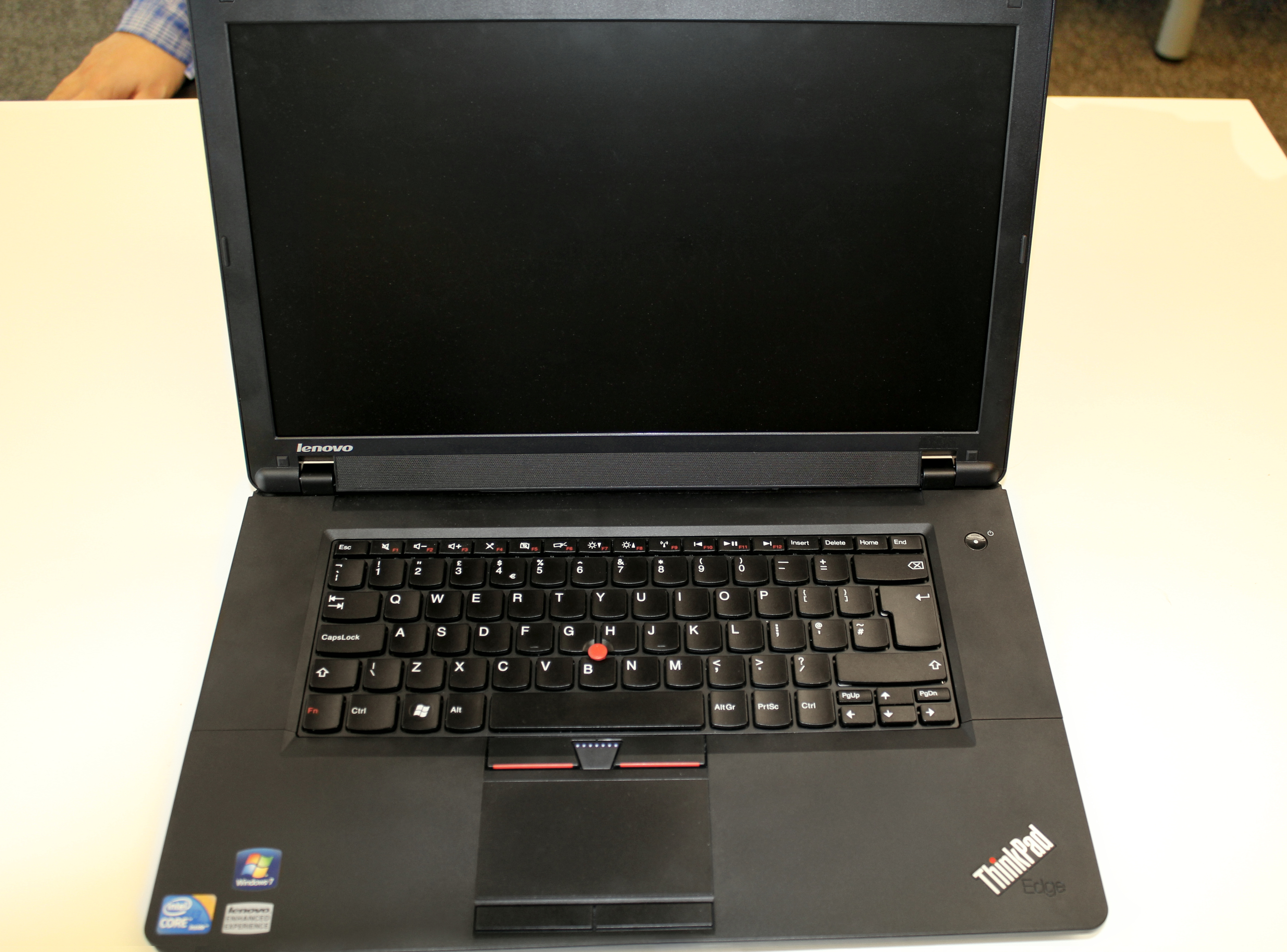
Edge 15

The ThinkPad Edge 14 and 15 laptops were both launched on March 22, 2010. A web review noted build quality above average, yet not the same as professional grade ThinkPad laptops. One difference was smaller screen hinges which were plastic-faced instead of metal. While the Edge 14 laptop did not have a roll cage, it was still durable, with no flex on the palm rest, keyboard and touchpad.

The Edge 15 laptop was noted for having the same features as the smaller laptops in the series, with lower build quality. The right side of the palm rest displayed flex under moderate pressure. The keyboard tray also displayed slight inward flexing at the optical drive area. Some positive features included a keyboard that was noted as being very easy to type on. The touchpad was also noticeably easy to use, with fast response time, no discernible lag, even without adjustments. But also at the Lenovo support forum, lots of keyboard failures were reported. The price was viewed favorably, with user experience and feature set receiving praise.

Specifications:

- Processor: Intel Core i5-560M; i5-460M; i3-390M; Mobile Intel 5 Series Discrete GFX Chipset
- Operating System: Microsoft Windows 7 Home Premium, or Professional (64-bit)
- Display: 14.0", 16:9 HD (1366×768), LED-backlight; 15.6", 16:9 HD (1366×768), LED-backlight
- Color: Midnight Black (Glossy, Matte), Heatwave Red (Glossy)
- RAM: up to 8 GB DDR3 1066 MHz (2 slots)
- Storage: 320 GB (5,400/7,200 rpm), 500 GB (5,400/7,200 rpm) SATA HDD

Model	Release (EU)	Dimensions	Weight ^{(min)}	CPU	Chipset	Memory ^{(max)}	Graphics	Storage	Networking	Audio	Screen	Battery	Other	Operating System
11.6"
Edge 11 (Intel)	2010		1.53 kg (3.4 lb)	Intel Celeron, Pentium, or 1st Gen Core i3	Intel; HM55	8 GB DDR3 — 1333 MHz (2 slots)	Intel HD Graphics	One 2.5" SATA Drive	Gigabit Ethernet; Wi-Fi Half Mini PCIe Card; Optional BT 2.1 Module; Optional WWAN Mini PCIe Card (exclusive)		1366×768	M(6)		
Edge 11 (AMD)	2010		1.33 kg (2.9 lb)	AMD Athlon II Neo	AMD M880G or SB820M	8 GB DDR3 — 1066 MHz (2 slots)	ATI Mobility Radeon HD 4225	One 2.5" SATA Drive	Gigabit Ethernet; Wi-Fi Half Mini PCIe Card; Optional BT 2.1 Module; Optional WWAN Mini PCIe Card (exclusive)		1366×768	M(6)		
13.3"
Edge 13 (Intel)	2010		1.63 kg (3.6 lb)	Intel Core 2 Duo SU7300 or 1st Gen Core i3-380UM	Intel; GM45 or HM55	8 GB DDR3 — 1066 or 1333 MHz (2 slots)	Intel GMA 4500MHD	One 2.5" SATA Drive	Gigabit Ethernet; Wi-Fi Half Mini PCIe Card; Optional BT 2.1 Module; Optional WWAN Mini PCIe Card (exclusive)		1366×768	M(6)		
Edge 13 (AMD)	2010		1.64 kg (3.6 lb)	AMD Athlon Neo X2 L325	AMD; M780G	8 GB DDR2 — 667 MHz (2 slots)	ATI Mobility Radeon HD 3200	One 2.5" SATA Drive	Gigabit Ethernet; Wi-Fi Half Mini PCIe Card; Optional BT 2.1 Module; Optional WWAN Mini PCIe Card (exclusive)		1366×768	M(6)		
14"
Edge 14 (Intel)	2010		2.14 kg (4.7 lb)	Intel Pentium or 1st Gen Core i3 or i5	Intel; HM55	8 GB DDR3 — 1066 MHz (2 slots)	Intel HD Graphics	One 2.5" SATA Drive; One DVD Drive	Gigabit Ethernet; Wi-Fi Half Mini PCIe Card; Optional BT 2.1 Module; Optional WWAN Mini PCIe Card (exclusive)		1366×768	M(6)		
Edge 14 (AMD)	2010		2.17 kg (4.8 lb)	AMD Athlon II or Turion II	AMD RS880M	8 GB DDR3 — 1066 MHz (2 slots)	ATI Mobility Radeon HD 4250	One 2.5" SATA Drive; One DVD Drive	Gigabit Ethernet; Wi-Fi Half Mini PCIe Card; Optional BT 2.1 Module; Optional WWAN Mini PCIe Card (exclusive)		1366×768	M(6)		
15.6"
Edge 15 (Intel)	2010		2.561 kg (5.65 lb)	Intel Pentium or 1st Gen Core i3 or i5	Intel; HM55	8 GB DDR3 — 1066 MHz (2 slots)	Intel HD Graphics	One 2.5" SATA Drive; One DVD Drive	Gigabit Ethernet; Wi-Fi Half Mini PCIe Card; Optional BT 2.1 Module; Optional WWAN Mini PCIe Card (exclusive)		1366×768	M(6)		
Edge 15 (AMD)	2010		2.5 kg (5.5 lb)	AMD Athlon II or Turion II	AMD RS880M	8 GB DDR3 — 1066 MHz (2 slots)	ATI Mobility Radeon HD 4250	One 2.5" SATA Drive; One DVD Drive	Gigabit Ethernet; Wi-Fi Half Mini PCIe Card; Optional BT 2.1 Module; Optional WWAN Mini PCIe Card (exclusive)		1366×768	M(6)		

=== Gen 2 (2011) ===
==== Edge E220s, E320, E325, E420, E420s ====
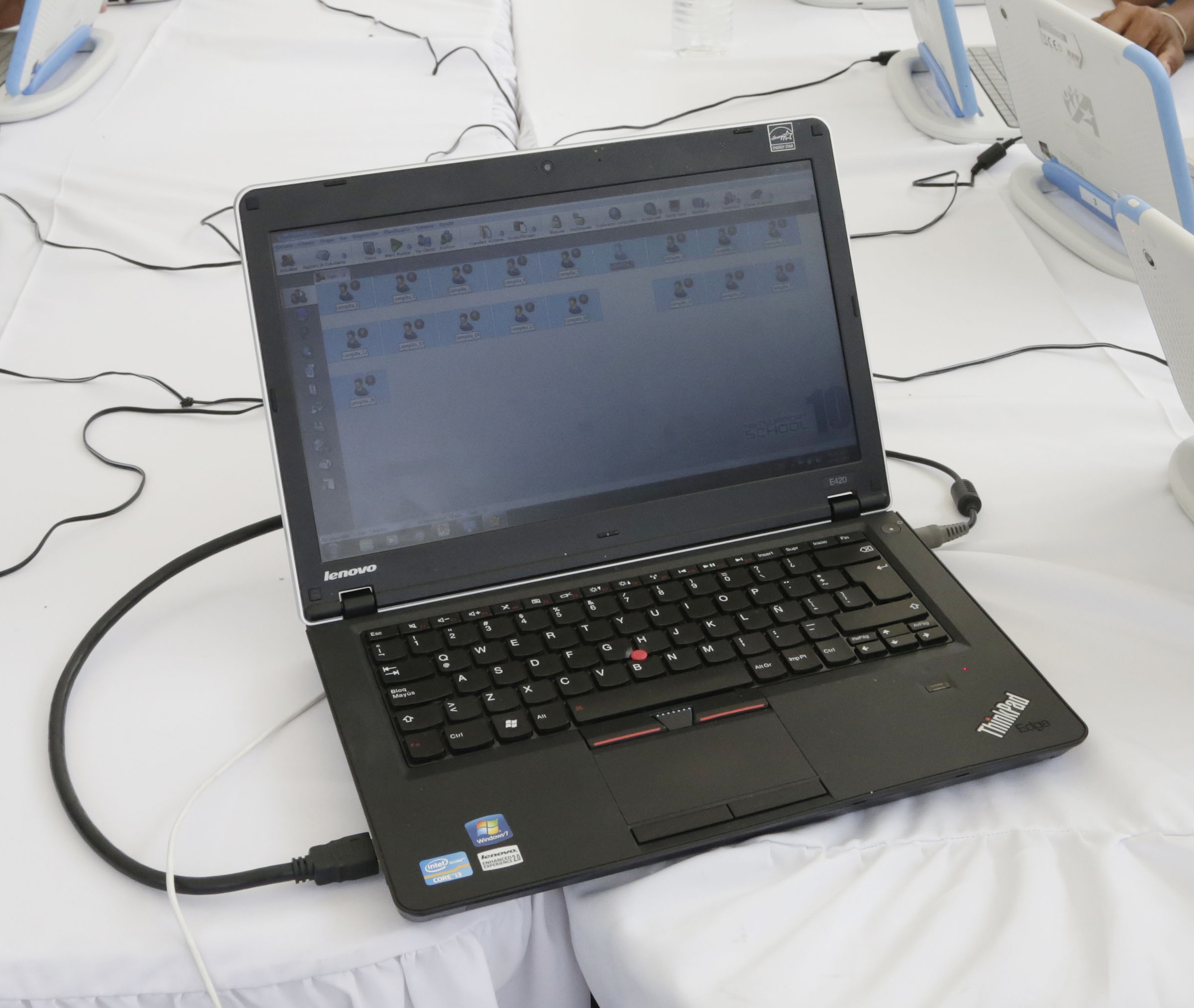
ThinkPad E420

The ThinkPad Edge E220s and E420s were released in Spring 2011, as an updated, "more premium" line of the ThinkPad Edge. These newer series are significantly thinner, and include more of the traditional ThinkPad line of features such as the integrated 720p web-cam. Also notable is the return to use of metallic hinges versus the less durable plastic seen on earlier Edge models. Both the E220s and E420s can be configured with up to an Intel Core i7 processor, which offers a higher level of performance than other notebooks of this size category. The surfaces have been accented with a chrome finish around the exterior, and the addition of the "infinity glass" screen, which features edge-to-edge glass paneling on the display. Many design aspects of the E220s line have been seen in the recently unveiled ThinkPad X1, including the keyboard and touchpad design.

==== Edge E520, E525 ====
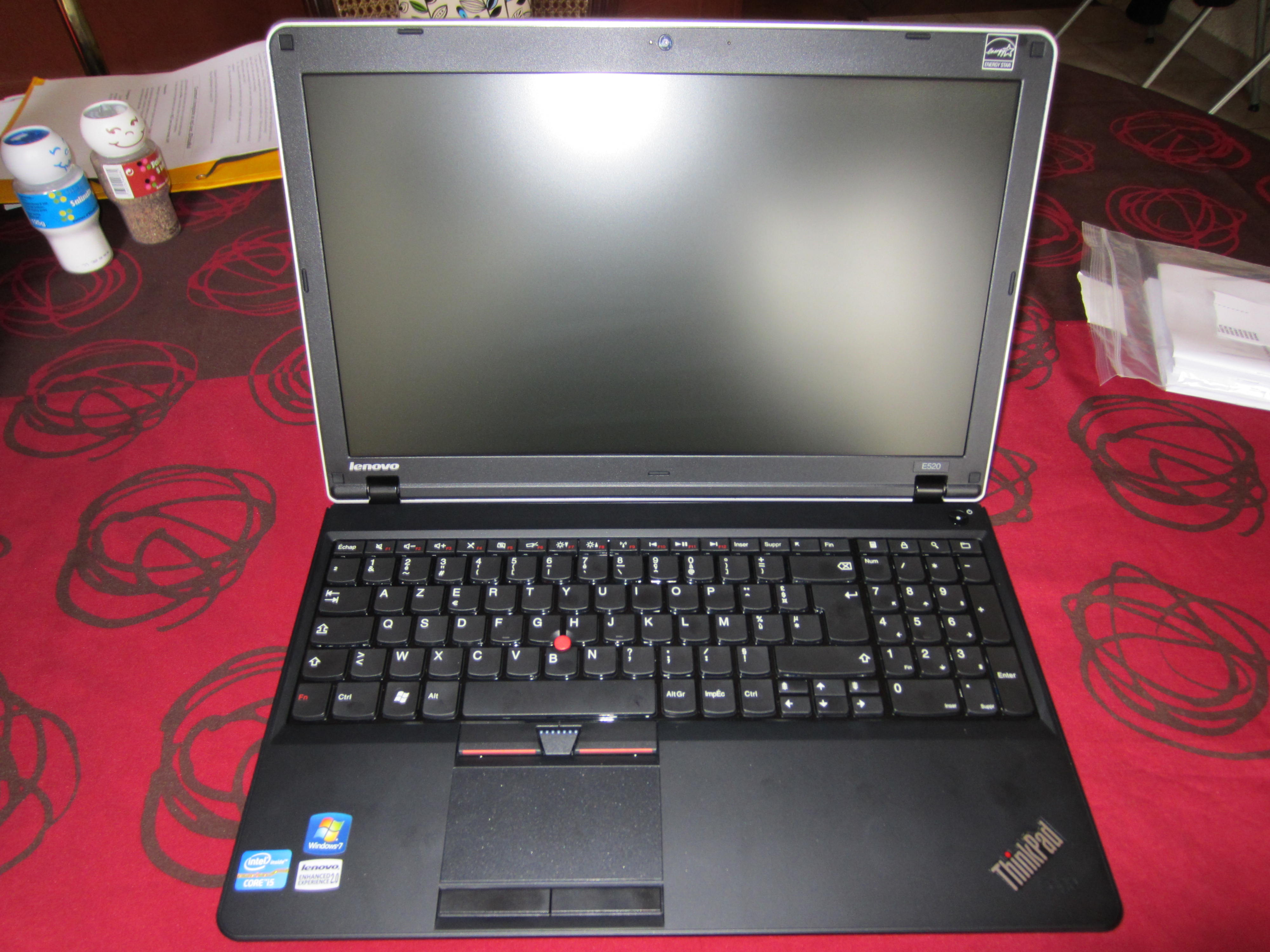
ThinkPad E520

The ThinkPad Edge E520 was launched at the same time as the E420. It is the first 15.6" ThinkPad to feature a numeric keypad.

Model	Dimensions (mm)	Weight ^{(min)}	CPU	Chipset	Memory ^{(max)}	Graphics	Storage	Networking	Audio	Display	Battery	Other	Operating System
11.6"
E120	289 × 208 × 23.5 mm (11.4 x 8.2 × .93 inches)	1.5 kg (3.3 lb)	Intel 2nd Gen Core i3	Intel; HM65	16 GB DDR3 — 1333 MHz (2 slots)	Intel HD Graphics 3000	One 2.5" SATA 7mm Drive	Gigabit Ethernet; Wi-Fi Half Mini PCIe Card; Optional BT 3.0 Module; Optional WWAN	HD audio with stereo Speakers, built-in digital mic and combo headphone/mic-in	1366×768 TN	M(6)		Windows 7 Home Premium; Windows 7 Professional
E125		1.35 kg (3.0 lb)	AMD C-50		16 GB DDR3L — 1333 MHz (2 slots)	AMD Radeon HD 6250	One 2.5" SATA 7mm Drive	Gigabit Ethernet; Wi-Fi Half Mini PCIe Card; Optional BT 3.0 Module		1366×768 TN	M(6)		
12.5"
E220s	377.4 × 252.3 × 24.5–25.9 mm (14.9 × 9.9 × 0.96–1.02 inches)	1.46 kg (3.2 lb)	2nd Gen Intel Core i3-2357M (2C4T 1.3 GHz) i3-2367M (2C4T 1.4 GHz) i5-2467M (2C4T 1.6 GHz/2.3 GHz Turbo) i5-2537M (2C4T 1.4 GHz/2.3 GHz Turbo) i7-2617M (2C4T 1.5 GHz/2.6 GHz Turbo)	Intel; HM65	8 GB DDR3 — 1333 MHz (1 slot)	Intel HD 3000	One 2.5" SATA Drive	Gigabit Ethernet; Wi-Fi Half Mini PCIe Card; Optional BT 3.0 Module; Optional WWAN Mini PCIe Card (exclusive)		1366x768 TN	m(8) (40.7 Wh)		
13.3"
E320		1.85 kg (4.1 lb)	2nd Gen Intel Core	Intel; HM65	16 GB DDR3 — 1333 MHz (2 slots)	Intel HD 3000; Option + AMD Radeon HD 6630M 1 GB	One 2.5" SATA Drive	Gigabit Ethernet; Wi-Fi Half Mini PCIe Card; BT 3.0 Module; Optional WWAN Mini PCIe Card (exclusive)		1366x768 TN	M(6)		
E325		1.79 kg (3.9 lb)	AMD E-350 or E-450	AMD; A50M; FCH	16 GB DDR3L — 1333 MHz (2 slots)	AMD Radeon HD 6310M or 6320M	One 2.5" SATA Drive	Gigabit Ethernet; Wi-Fi Half Mini PCIe Card; BT 3.0 Module; Optional WWAN Mini PCIe Card (exclusive)		1366x768 TN	M(6)		
14"
E420	343.4 × 233.6 × 28.7-36.4 mm (13.52 × 9.20 × 1.13-1.43 inches)	2.2 kg (4.9 lb)	2nd Gen Intel Core	Intel; HM65	16 GB DDR3 — 1333 MHz (2 slots)	Intel HD Graphics 3000	One 2.5" SATA Drive; One DVD Drive	Gigabit Ethernet; Wi-Fi Half Mini PCIe Card; Optional BT 3.0 Module; Optional WWAN Mini PCIe Card (exclusive)		1366x768 TN	M(9)		
E420s	349 × 236 × 23.1 mm (13.74 × 9.29 × 0.91 inches)	1.88 kg (4.1 lb)	2nd Gen Intel Core i3-2310M(2C4T 2.1 GHz) i3-2330M(2C4T 2.2 GHz) i5-2410M (2C4T 2.3 GHz/2.9 GHz Turbo) i5-2430M (2C4T 2.4 GHz/3.0 GHz Turbo) i5-2450M (2C4T 2.5 GHz/3.1 GHz Turbo)	Intel; HM65	16 GB DDR3 — 1333 MHz (2 slots)	Intel HD Graphics 3000	One 2.5" SATA Drive; One DVD Drive	Gigabit Ethernet; Wi-Fi Half Mini PCIe Card; Optional BT 3.0 Module; Optional WWAN Mini PCIe Card (exclusive)		1366x768 TN	m(4) (48.8 Wh)		
E425	343.4 × 233.6 × 28.7-36.4 mm (13.52 × 9.20 × 1.13-1.43 inches)	2.2 kg (4.9 lb)	AMD E2 or A4	AMD; A60M; FCH	16 GB DDR3L — 1333 MHz (2 slots)	AMD Radeon HD Graphics + AMD Radeon HD 6470M 1 GB	One 2.5" SATA Drive; One DVD Drive	Gigabit Ethernet; Wi-Fi Half Mini PCIe Card; Optional BT 3.0 Module		1366x768 TN	M(9)		
15.6"
E520		2.5 kg (5.5 lb)	2nd Gen Intel Core	Intel; HM65	16 GB DDR3 — 1333 MHz (2 slots)	Intel HD 3000	One 2.5" SATA Drive; One DVD Drive	Gigabit Ethernet; Wi-Fi Half Mini PCIe Card; Optional BT 3.0 Module; Optional WWAN Mini PCIe Card (exclusive)		1366x768 TN	M(9)	Numeric keypad	
E525		2.58 kg (5.7 lb)	AMD E2, A4, A6, or A8	AMD; A60M; FCH	16 GB DDR3L — 1333 MHz (2 slots)	AMD Radeon HD Graphics	One 2.5" SATA Drive; One DVD Drive	Gigabit Ethernet; Wi-Fi Half Mini PCIe Card; Optional BT 3.0 Module; Optional WWAN Mini PCIe Card (exclusive)		1366x768 TN	M(9)	Numeric keypad	

=== Gen 3 (2012) ===
==== Edge 13" (E330, E335) ====
ThinkPad E335

Edge E330 is the 13 inch version of the third generations of the ThinkPad Edge series. Available with the 2nd gen and the 3rd gen Intel processors ranging from Celeron, Pentium, and the Core i-series (i3, i5, and i7), it uses Intel HD Graphics as the video accelerator. A higher-end NVIDIA GeForce 610M option was available in the different but similar model, the L330. The ThinkPad Edge E335 is the AMD version of the E330 and it uses AMD APUs and uses Radeon HD Graphics. They also features a pair of 2 watts speaker system with Dolby® Advanced Audio v2 sound technology.

==== Edge 14" (E430, E430c, E431, E435) ====
The E430 is powered by second and third generation Intel Core processors with Intel HD Graphics or Nvidia Graphics. Battery life is increased with Nvidia's Optimus power management technology. Dedicated keys for controlling audio and video functions, Dolby Advanced Audio rated speakers, and an optional 720p camera were added to improve the experience for users of VOIP. The E430 makes use of USB 3.0 to improve data transfer speeds.

==== Edge 15" (E530, E531, E535) ====
Model	Dimensions (mm)	Weight ^{(min)}	CPU	Chipset	Memory ^{(max)}	Graphics	Storage	Networking	Audio	Display	Battery	Other	Operating System
11.6"
E130		1.54 kg (3.4 lb)	Intel Pentium, or 2nd or 3rd Gen Core i3	Intel; HM77	8 GB DDR3L — 1600 MHz (2 slots)	Intel HD Graphics, HD Graphics 3000, or HD Graphics 4000	One 2.5" SATA 7mm Drive	Gigabit Ethernet; Wi-Fi + BT Half Mini PCIe Card; Optional WWAN mSATA Card		1366×768 TN	M(6)		
E135		1.54 kg (3.4 lb)	AMD E-300, E2-1800 or E2-2000	AMD; A68M; FCH	8 GB DDR3L — 1600 MHz (2 slots)	AMD Radeon HD 6310 or 7340	One 2.5" SATA 7mm Drive	Gigabit Ethernet; Wi-Fi + BT Half Mini PCIe Card		1366×768 TN	M(6)		
13.3"
E330		1.8 kg (4.0 lb)	Intel Pentium, Celeron or Core i3, i5, i7	Intel; HM77	8 GB max PC3-12800 1600 MHz DDR3 (two 204-pin SO-DIMM slots)	Intel HD Graphics or Intel HD Graphics 3000 in processor	One SATA 3.0 Gb/s, 2.5" wide, 7 mm or 9.5 mm high	Gigabit Ethernet, Realtek RTL8111F; Wi-Fi + BT Half Mini PCIe Card; Optional WWAN mSATA Card		1366×768	6-cell (62.4 Wh)		
E335		1.8 kg (4.0 lb)	AMD E2-1800	AMD; A68M; FCH	8 GB DDR3-SDRAM — 1600 MHz (two SO-DIMM slots)	AMD Radeon HD 7340G	One SATA 3.0 Gb/s, 2.5" wide, 7 mm or 9.5 mm high	Gigabit Ethernet; Wi-Fi + BT Half Mini PCIe Card		1366×768	6 cell 62 Wh)		
14"
E430	339.4 × 234 × 28.5 mm (13.36 × 9.21 × 1.12 inches)	2.15 kg (4.7 lb)	2nd Gen Intel Core i3-2328M (2C4T 2.2 GHz) i3-2348M (2C4T 2.3 GHz) i3-2350M (2C4T 2.3 GHz) i3-2450M (2C4T 2.5 GHz/3.1 GHz Turbo) 3rd Gen Intel Core i3-3120M (2C4T 2.5 GHz) i3-3130M (2C4T 2.6 GHz) i5-3210M (2C4T 2.5 GHz/3.1 GHz Turbo) i5-3230M (2C4T 2.6 GHz/3.2 GHz Turbo) i7-3612QM (4C8T 2.1 GHz/3.1 GHz Turbo) i7-3632QM (4C8T 2.2 GHz/3.2 GHz Turbo)	Intel; HM77	16 GB DDR3L 1600 MHz (2 slots)	Intel HD 3000 (2nd Gen Core); Intel HD 4000 (3rd Gen Core); Option + Nvidia GeForce GT610M (1 GB DDR3)	One 2.5" SATA Drive; One DVD Drive	Gigabit Ethernet; Wi-Fi + Optional BT Half Mini PCIe Card		1366x768 TN	M(6) (48-62 Wh)		
E430c	339.4 × 234 × 28.5 mm (13.36 × 9.21 × 1.12 inches)	2.15 kg (4.7 lb)	2nd Gen Intel Core i3 i3-2328M (2C4T 2.2 GHz) i3-2348M (2C4T 2.3 GHz)	Intel; HM77	16 GB DDR3L 1600 MHz (2 slots)	Intel HD Graphics 3000	One 2.5" SATA Drive; One DVD Drive	Gigabit Ethernet; Wi-Fi + Optional BT Half Mini PCIe Card		1366x768 TN	M(6)		
E431	13.54 x 9.41 x 1.17 inches 344 x 239 x 29.7 mm	2.43 kg (5.4 lb)	2nd Gen Intel Core i3-2348M (2C4T 2.3 GHz) 3rd Gen Intel Core i3-3110M (2C4T 2.4 GHz) i3-3120M (2C4T 2.5 GHz) i3-3130M (2C4T 2.6 GHz) i5-3230M (2C4T 2.5 GHz/3.2 GHz Turbo) i5-3320M (2C4T 2.6 GHz/3.3 GHz Turbo) i7-3632QM (4C8T 2.2 GHz/3.2 GHz Turbo)	Intel; HM77	16 GB DDR3L 1600 MHz (2 slots)	Intel HD 3000 (2nd Gen Core); Intel HD 4000 (3rd Gen Core); Option + Nvidia GeForce GT710M (1 GB DDR3)	One 2.5" SATA Drive; One DVD Drive	Gigabit Ethernet; Wi-Fi + BT Half Mini PCIe Card		1366x768 TN	M(6)		
E435	339.4 x 234 x 28.5 mm (13.36 x 9.21 x 1.12 inches)	2.15 kg (4.7 lb)	AMD 2nd Gen Mobile APUs; AMD A4-4300M (2C/2T 2.5 GHz/3.0 GHz Turbo); AMD A6-4400M (2C/2T 2.7 GHz/3.2 GHz Turbo); AMD A8-4500M (4C/4T 1.9 GHz/2.8 GHz Turbo); AMD A10-4600M (4C/4T 2.3 GHz/2.8 GHz Turbo)	AMD; A70M; FCH	32GB DDR3L 1600 MHz (2 slots)	AMD Radeon HD Graphics; Option + AMD Radeon HD 7470M (512 MB GDDR3)	One 2.5" SATA Drive; One DVD Drive	Gigabit Ethernet; Wi-Fi + Optional BT Half Mini PCIe Card		1366x768 TN	M(6)		
15.6"
E530	377 x 245 x 29.5 mm (14.84 x 9.65 x 1.16 inches)	2.45 kg (5.4 lb)	Intel Sandy Bridge Pentium; B960 (2C2T 2.2 GHz); B970 (2C2T 2.3 GHz); B980 (2C2T 2.4 GHz) 2nd Gen Intel Core i3-2328M (2C4T 2.2 GHz) i3-2348M (2C4T 2.3 GHz) i3-2350M (2C4T 2.3 GHz) i3-2450M (2C4T 2.5 GHz/3.1 GHz Turbo) 3rd Gen Intel Core i3-3110M (2C4T 2.4 GHz) i3-3120M (2C4T 2.5 GHz) i3-3130M (2C4T 2.6 GHz) i5-3210M (2C4T 2.5 GHz/3.1 GHz Turbo) i5-3230M (2C4T 2.6 GHz/3.2 GHz Turbo) i7-3612QM (4C8T 2.1 GHz/3.1 GHz Turbo) i7-3632QM (4C8T 2.2 GHz/3.2 GHz Turbo)	Intel; HM77	16 GB DDR3L 1600 MHz (2 slots)	Intel HD (Pentium); Intel HD 3000 (2nd Gen Core); Intel HD 4000 (3rd Gen Core); Option + Nvidia GeForce GT630M (2 GB DDR3) or Nvidia GeForce GT635M (2 GB DDR3)	One 2.5" SATA Drive; One DVD Drive	Gigabit Ethernet; Wi-Fi + Optional BT Half Mini PCIe Card; Optional WWAN Half Mini PCIe Card (exclusive)		1366x768 TN; 1600x900 IPS	M(6) (48 Wh)	Numeric keypad	
E530c	377 x 245 x 29.5 mm (14.84 x 9.65 x 1.16 inches)	2.45 kg (5.4 lb)	Intel Celeron, Sandy Bridge Pentium, 2nd Gen Intel Core, or 3rd Gen Intel Core	Intel; HM77	16 GB DDR3L 1600 MHz (2 slots)	Intel HD (Celeron, Pentium); Intel HD 3000 (2nd Gen Core); Intel HD 4000 (3rd Gen Core)	One 2.5" SATA Drive; One DVD Drive	Gigabit Ethernet; Wi-Fi + Optional BT Half Mini PCIe Card		1366x768 TN	M(6)	Numeric keypad	
E531	377 x 250 x 26.6 mm (14.84 x 9.84 x 1.05 inches)	2.46 kg (5.4 lb)	Ivy Bridge Pentium; Pentium 2030M (2C2T 2.5 GHz) 2nd Gen Intel Core i3-2348M (2C4T 2.3 GHz) 3rd Gen Intel Core i3-3110M (2C4T 2.4 GHz) i3-3120M (2C4T 2.5 GHz) i3-3130M (2C4T 2.6 GHz) i5-3230M (2C4T 2.5 GHz/3.2 GHz Turbo) i5-3320M (2C4T 2.6 GHz/3.3 GHz Turbo) i7-3632QM (4C8T 2.2 GHz/3.2 GHz Turbo)	Intel; HM77	16 GB DDR3L 1600 MHz (2 slots)	Intel HD (Pentium); Intel HD 3000 (2nd Gen Core); Intel HD 4000 (3rd Gen Core); Option + Nvidia GeForce GT710M (1 GB DDR3) or Nvidia GeForce GT740M (2GB DDR3)	One 2.5" SATA Drive; One DVD Drive	Gigabit Ethernet; Wi-Fi + BT Half Mini PCIe Card; Optional WWAN Half Mini PCIe Card (exclusive)		1366x768 TN; 1600x900 IPS	M(6)	Numeric keypad	
E535	377 x 245 x 29.5 mm (14.84 x 9.65 x 1.16 inches)	2.45 kg (5.4 lb)	AMD 2nd Gen Mobile APUs; AMD A4-4300M (2C/2T 2.5 GHz/3.0 GHz Turbo); AMD A6-4400M (2C/2T 2.7 GHz/3.2 GHz Turbo); AMD A8-4500M (4C/4T 1.9 GHz/2.8 GHz Turbo); AMD A10-4600M (4C/4T 2.3 GHz/2.8 GHz Turbo)	AMD; A70M; FCH	32GB DDR3L 1600 MHz (2 slots)	AMD Radeon HD Graphics; Option + AMD Radeon HD 7670M (1 GB GDDR3)	One 2.5" SATA Drive; One DVD Drive	Gigabit Ethernet; Wi-Fi + Optional BT Half Mini PCIe Card		1366x768 TN	M(6)	Numeric keypad	

=== Gen 4 (2013) ===
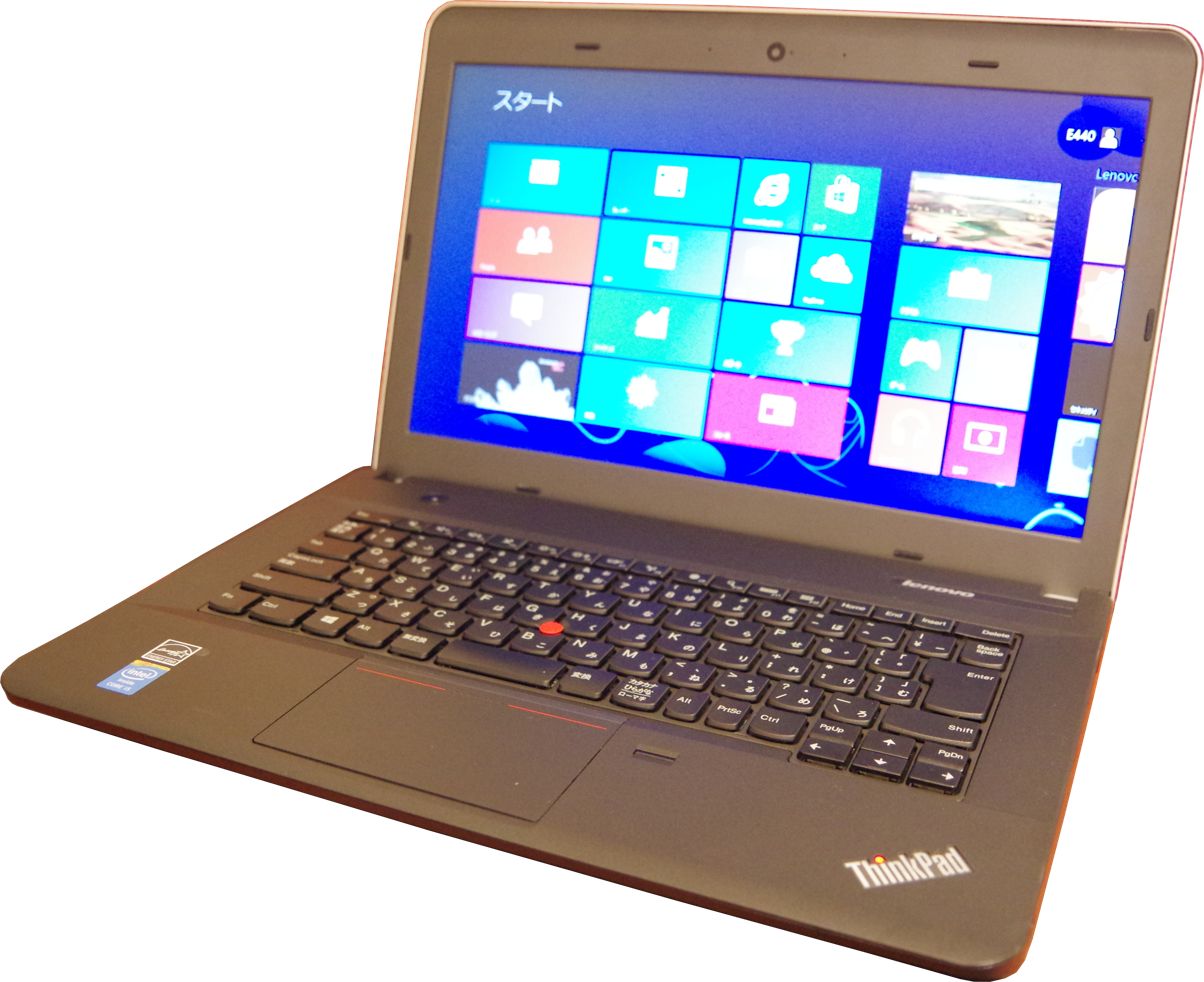
ThinkPad E440 Touch

Like the parallel T-series models (T440/T540), Gen4 E-series do not have a touchpad\trackpoint physical buttons.

==== Edge 14" (E440) ====
The ThinkPad Edge E440 was released in 2013, as an update to the ThinkPad Edge E430. The new E440 includes new Intel 4th Gen Haswell Processors and 1920x1080 FHD Screen options.

==== Edge 15" (E540, E545) ====
The ThinkPad Edge E540 was released in 2013, as an update to the ThinkPad Edge E530. The new E540 includes new Intel 4th Gen Core (Haswell-MB) processors, 1920x1080 FHD Screen options, and Nvidia Graphics

The ThinkPad Edge E545 was released in 2013, as an update to the ThinkPad Edge E535. The new E545 includes new AMD Richland Series APUs and AMD Graphics

Model	Dimensions (mm)	Weight ^{(min)}	CPU	Chipset	Memory ^{(max)}	Graphics	Storage	Networking	Audio	Display	Battery	Other	Operating System
11.6"
E145		1.54 kg (3.4 lb)	AMD E1-2500 or A4-5000		32 GB DDR3L — 1600 MHz (2 slots)	AMD Radeon HD 8240 or 8330	One 2.5" SATA 7mm Drive	Gigabit Ethernet; Wi-Fi + BT Half Mini PCIe Card		1366×768 TN	M(6)		
14"
E440	13.54 x 9.41 x 1.17 Inches; 344 x 239 x 29.7mm	2.43 kg (5.4 lb)	4th Gen Intel Core i3-4000M (2C4T 2.4 GHz) i3-4100M(2C4T 2.5 GHz) i5-4200M (2C4T 2.5 GHz/3.2 GHz Turbo) i5-4210M(2C4T 2.6 GHz/3.3 GHz Turbo) i7-4702MQ (4C8T 2.2 GHz/3.2 GHz Turbo) i7-4712MQ (4C8T 2.3 GHz/3.3 GHz Turbo)	Intel HM87	16 GB DDR3L 1600 MHz (2 slots)	Intel HD 4600	One 2.5" SATA; One Optical Drive	Gigabit Ethernet; Wi-Fi + BT Half Mini PCIe Card		1366x768 TN; 1366x768 (touch)	M(6) (48-62 Wh)		
15.6"
E540	14.84 x 9.84 x 1.05 inches 377 x 250 x 26.6 mm	2.46 kg (5.4 lb)	Intel Pentium Haswell; Pentium 3550M (2C2T 2.3 GHz); Pentium 3560M(2C2T 2.4 GHz) 4th Gen Intel Core i3-4000M (2C4T 2.4 GHz) i3-4100M(2C4T 2.5 GHz) i5-4200M (2C4T 2.5 GHz/3.2 GHz Turbo) i5-4210M(2C4T 2.6 GHz/3.2 GHz Turbo) i5-4300M (2C4T 2.6 GHz/3.3 GHz Turbo) i7-4702MQ (4C8T 2.2 GHz/3.2 GHz Turbo) i7-4712MQ (4C8T 2.3 GHz/3.3 GHz Turbo)	Intel; HM87	16 GB DDR3L 1600 MHz (2 slots)	Intel HD 4600; Option + Nvidia GeForce 710M (1GB DDR3) or Nvidia GeForce GT740M (2 GB DDR3)	One 2.5" SATA; One Optical Drive	Gigabit Ethernet; Wi-Fi + BT Half Mini PCIe Card; Optional WWAN M.2 SATA Card		1366x768 TN; 1920x1080 IPS; 1366x768 (touch); 1920x1080 (touch)	M(6) (48-62 Wh)		
E545	14.84 x 9.65 x 1.12 Inches; 377 x 245 x 28.5mm	2.37 kg (5.2 lb)	AMD Trinity Mobile APU; A8-4500 (4C4T 1.9 GHz/2.8 GHz Turbo) AMD Richland Mobile APU; A6-5350M (2C2T 2.9 GHz/3.5 GHz Turbo); A8-5550M (4C4T 2.1 GHz/3.1 GHz Turbo); A10-5750M (4C4T 2.5 GHz/3.5 GHz Turbo)	AMD; A76M FCH	32 GB DDR3L 1600 MHz (2 slots)	AMD Radeon HD Graphics; Option + AMD Radeon HD8570M (2GB GDDR5)	One 2.5" SATA; One Optical Drive	Gigabit Ethernet; Wi-Fi + BT Half Mini PCIe Card		1366x768 TN	M(6) (48 Wh)		

=== Gen 5 (2014) ===
==== 14" (E450, E455) ====
The ThinkPad Edge E450 was released in 2015, as an update to the ThinkPad Edge E440. The new E450 includes new Intel 5th Gen Broadwell low power processors, 1920x1080 FHD Screen options, and new AMD R7 Mobile Dedicated Graphics.

The ThinkPad Edge E455 was released in 2015, as a new 14" ThinkPad with AMD Mobile APU Processors. The new E455 includes new AMD Kaveri Processors, 1920x1080 FHD Screen options, and new AMD Graphics.

==== 15.6" (E550, E555) ====
The ThinkPad Edge E550 was released in 2015, as an update to the ThinkPad Edge 540. The new E550 includes new Intel 5th Gen Broadwell low power processors, 1920x1080 FHD Screen options, and new AMD R7 Mobile Dedicated Graphics.

The ThinkPad Edge E555 was released in 2015, as an update to the ThinkPad Edge 545. The new E555 includes new AMD Kaveri Processors, 1920x1080 FHD Screen options, and new AMD Graphics.

Model	Dimensions (mm)	Weight ^{(min)}	CPU	Chipset	Memory ^{(max)}	Graphics	Storage	Networking	Audio	Display	Battery	Other	Operating System
14"
E450	339 x 239 x 24 mm (13.35 x 9.41 x 0.94 inches	1.81 kg (4.0 lb)	4th Gen Intel Core i3-4005U (2C4T 2.4 GHz) 5th Gen Intel Core i3-5005U (2C4T 2.0 GHz) i5-5200U(2C4T 2.2 GHz/2.7 GHz Turbo) i7-5500U (4C8T 2.4 GHz/3.0 GHz Turbo)		16 GB DDR3L 1600 MHz (2 slots)	Intel HD 4400 (4th Gen Core); Intel HD 5500 (5th Gen Core); Option + AMD Radeon R5 M240 (1 GB DDR3) or AMD Radeon R7 M260 (2 GB DDR3)	One 2.5" SATA	Gigabit Ethernet; Wi-Fi + BT M.2 Card		1366x768 TN; 1920x1080 IPS	m(6) (47 Wh)		
E455	339 x 239 x 24 mm (13.35 x 9.41 x 0.94 inches	1.81 kg (4.0 lb)	AMD Kaveri Mobile APU; A6-7000 (2C2T 2.2 GHz/3.0 GHz Turbo); A8-7100 (4C4T 1.8 GHz/3.0 GHz Turbo); A10-7300 (4C4T 1.9 GHz/3.2 GHz Turbo)	AMD; A76M; FCH	16 GB DDR3L 1600 MHz (2 slots)	AMD R4 (A6-7000); AMD R5 (A8-7100); AMD R7 (A10-7300); Option + AMD Radeon R5 M240 (2 GB DDR3)	One 2.5" SATA	Gigabit Ethernet; Wi-Fi + BT M.2 Card		1366x768 TN; 1920x1080 IPS	m(6) (47 Wh)		
15.6"
E550	377 x 256 x 27 mm (14.84 x 10.08 x 1.06 Inches)	2.46 kg (5.4 lb)	4th Gen Intel Core i3-4005U (2C4T 2.4 GHz) 5th Gen Intel Core i3-5005U (2C4T 2.0 GHz) i3-5015U (2C4T 2.1 GHz) i5-5200U(2C4T 2.2 GHz/2.7 GHz Turbo) i7-5500U (4C8T 2.4 GHz/3.0 GHz Turbo)		16 GB DDR3L 1600 MHz (2 slots)	Intel HD Graphics 4400 (4th Gen Core); Intel HD 5500 (5th Gen Core); Option + AMD Radeon R7 M260 (2 GB DDR3)	One 2.5" SATA; One Optical Drive	Gigabit Ethernet; Wi-Fi + BT M.2 Card		1366x768 TN; 1920x1080 IPS	M(6) (48 Wh)		
E555	14.84 x 10.04 x 1.07 inches 377 x 255 x 27.1 mm	2.36 kg (5.2 lb)	AMD Kaveri Mobile APU; A6-7000 (2C2T 2.2 GHz/3.0 GHz Turbo); A8-7100 (4C4T 1.8 GHz/3.0 GHz Turbo); A10-7300 (4C4T 1.9 GHz/3.2 GHz Turbo); FX-7500 (4C4T 2.1GHz/3.3 GHz Turbo)	AMD; A76M; FCH	16 GB DDR3L 1600 MHz (2 slots)	AMD R4 (A6-7000); AMD R5 (A8-7100); AMD R7 (A10-7300 & FX-7500); Option + AMD Radeon R5 M240 (2 GB DDR3)	One 2.5" SATA; One Optical Drive	Gigabit Ethernet; Wi-Fi + BT M.2 Card		1366x768 TN; 1920x1080 IPS	M(6) (48 Wh)		

=== Gen 6 (2015) ===
==== 14" (E460, E465) ====
Lenovo ThinkPad E460, E465
- Introductory price: $449.20
- Storage: 500 GB to 1 TB 7,200 rpm 256 GB SSD OPAL2.0
- Sound: Dolby Audio Advanced, Stereo Speakers
- Input: Fingerprint Reader
- Camera: 720p Cam
- Connectivity: 2 x USB 3.0; 1 x USB 2.0; HDMI; Ethernet; 4-in-1 Reader

The E460 and E465 have a 14-inch display and optionally come with a Windows 7 (Pro) or Windows 10 64-bit system.

The E460 uses Intel Skylake (6th Generation) processors.

The E465 is similar to the E460 but it uses an AMD processor.

==== 15" (E560, E565) ====
Lenovo ThinkPad E560, E565

The E560 and E565 have a 15.6-inch display and optionally come with a Windows 7 (Pro) or Windows 10 64-bit system.

The E560 uses Intel Skylake (6th Generation) processors.

The E565 is similar to the E560 but it uses an AMD processor.

Model	Release (US)	Dimensions	Weight ^{(min)}	CPU	Chipset	Memory ^{(max)}	Graphics	Storage	Networking	Audio	Screen	Battery	Other	Operating System
14"
E460	Late 2015		1.92 kg (4.2 lb)	6th Gen Intel Core i7-6500U i5-6200U i3-6100U		32 GB DDR3L — 1600 MHz (2 slots)	Intel HD 520; Option + AMD Radeon R5 M330 (2 GB) or Radeon R7 M360 (2 GB)	One 2.5" SATA	Gigabit Ethernet; Wi-Fi + BT M.2 Card		Anti-glare: 1366×768 TN; 1920×1080 IPS	m		
E465	Late 2015		1.94 kg (4.3 lb)	AMD A Series; A6-8500P (2 x 1.6 GHz, R5 M330); A8-8600P (4 x 1.6 GHz, R5 M335DX); A10-8700P (4 x 1.8 GHz, R5 M340DX)		32 GB DDR3L — 1600 MHz (2 slots)	AMD R5 M330 for A6 or Dual Graphics for A8 and A10	One 2.5" SATA	Gigabit Ethernet; Wi-Fi + BT M.2 Card		Anti-glare: 1366×768 TN; 1920×1080 IPS	m		
15.6"
E560	Late 2015	377 x 255 x 23.8 mm (14.84 x 10.04 x 1.07 inches)	2.45 kg (5.4 lb)	6th Gen Intel Core i7-6500U i5-6200U i3-6100U		32 GB DDR3L — 1600 MHz (2 slots)	Intel HD 520; Option + AMD Radeon R7 M370 (2 GB GDDR5)	One 2.5" SATA; One Optical Drive	Gigabit Ethernet; Wi-Fi + BT M.2 Card		Anti-glare: 1366×768 TN, 220 nits 1920×1080 IPS, 250 nits	M(6)		
E565	Late 2015	377 x 255 x 23.8 mm (14.84 x 10.04 x 1.07 inches)	2.48 kg (5.5 lb)	AMD A Series; A10-8700P; A6-8500P		32 GB DDR3L — 1600 MHz (2 slots)	AMD Radeon R6; Option + M340DX (Note: Internal crossfire with AMD Radeon R7 M330 (2 GB GDDR5))	One 2.5" SATA; One Optical Drive	Gigabit Ethernet; Wi-Fi + BT M.2 Card		Anti-glare: 1366×768 TN, 220 nits 1920×1080 IPS, 250 nits	M(6)		

=== Gen 7 (2016) ===
==== 14" (E470, E475) ====
Lenovo ThinkPad E470, E475
- Introductory price: $479.20 (E470), $389.25 (E475)
- Storage: 500 GB 7,200 rpm 256 GB SSD OPAL2.0
- Sound: 2 x 2W Speakers; Dolby Audio Premium; Dual Mic
- Input: Fingerprint Reader
- Camera: 720p Cam
- Connectivity: 2 x USB 3.0; 1 x USB 2.0; Ethernet; HDMI; 4-in-1 Reader

The E470 and E475 have a 14-inch display and optionally come with a Windows 10 64-bit system.

The E470 uses Intel Kaby Lake (7th Generation) processors.

The E475 is similar to the E470 but it uses an AMD processor.

==== 15" (E570, E570c, E570p, E575) ====
Lenovo ThinkPad E570, E575
- Introductory price: $479.20 (E570), $415.20 (E575)
- Storage: 500 GB 7,200 rpm 256 GB PCIe SSD OPAL2.0
- Sound: 2 x 2W Speakers; Dolby Audio Premium; Dual Mic
- Camera: 720p Cam
- Connectivity: 2 x USB 3.0; 1 x USB 2.0; HDMI; VGA
- Power: 7.6 hrs

The E570 and E575 have a 15.6-inch display and optionally come with a Windows 10 64-bit system.

The E570 uses the 7th Generation Intel Core processors.

The E575 is similar to the E570 but it uses an AMD processor.

The E570p was released in 2017 and has a high power CPU and mainstream GPU.

Model	Release (US)	Dimensions	Weight ^{(min)}	CPU	Chipset	Memory ^{(max)}	Graphics	Storage	Networking	Audio	Screen	Battery	Other	Operating System
14"
E470	2016	339 x 242 x 23.7 mm (13.34 x 9.52 x 0.93 inches)	1.87 kg (4.1 lb)	7th Gen Intel Core i7-7500U (4 MB, up to 3.50 GHz) i5-7200U i3-7100U		64 GB DDR4 — 2133 MHz (2 slots)	Intel HD Graphics 620; Optional + NVIDIA GeForce 920MX (2 ГБ) or GeForce 940MX (2 GB)	One 2.5" SATA	Gigabit Ethernet; Wi-Fi + BT M.2 Card		Anti-glare: 1366×768 TN; 1920×1080 TN; 1920×1080 IPS	m		
E475	2016	339 x 242 x 23.7 mm (13.34 x 9.52 x 0.93 inches)	1.87 kg (4.1 lb)	AMD A Series A10-9600P (2 MB, up to 3.3 GHz); A6-9500B		32 GB DDR4 — 2133 MHz (2 slots)	AMD Radeon R5 Graphics Optional + AMD Radeon R5 M430 2 GB	One 2.5" SATA	Gigabit Ethernet; Wi-Fi + BT M.2 Card		Anti-glare: 1366×768 TN; 1920×1080 TN; 1920×1080 IPS	m		
15.6"
E570	2016	379 × 261 × 22.9 mm (14.92 × 10.27 × 0.90 inches)	2.31 kg (5.1 lb)	7th Gen Intel Core; Up to i7-7500U (4 MB, up to 3.50 GHz)		64 GB DDR4 — 2133 MHz (2 slots)	Intel HD 620; Optional + NVIDIA GeForce 950M (2 GB)	One 2.5" SATA; One Optical Drive	Gigabit Ethernet; Wi-Fi + BT M.2 Card		Anti-glare: 1366×768 TN; 1920×1080 IPS	M(4)		
E570c		379 × 261 × 22.9 mm (14.92 × 10.27 × 0.90 inches)												
E570p	2017		2.39 kg (5.3 lb)	7th Gen Intel Core i5-7300HQ i7-7700HQ		64 GB DDR4 — 2133 MHz (2 slots)	Intel HD 630 + NVIDIA GeForce GTX 1050 Ti (2 GB GDDR5)	One 2.5" SATA; One M.2 x?	Gigabit Ethernet; Wi-Fi + BT M.2 Card		Anti-glare: 1920×1080 IPS	m(6)		
E575	2016	379 × 261 × 22.9 mm (14.92 × 10.27 × 0.90 inches)	2.31 kg (5.1 lb)	AMD A Series A10-9600P (2 MB, up to 3.3 GHz); A8		32 GB DDR4 — 2133 MHz (2 slots)	AMD Radeon R5 Graphics; Optional + AMD Radeon R5 M430 2GB	One 2.5" SATA; One Optical Drive	Gigabit Ethernet; Wi-Fi + BT M.2 Card		Anti-glare: 1366×768 TN; 1920×1080 IPS	M(4)		

=== Gen 8 (2017) ===
==== 14" (E480, E485) ====
The E480 and E485 have a 14-inch display and optionally come with a Windows 10 64-bit system. USB type-C is used for charging for the first time in the ThinkPad E series. The USB-C port can also connect to most USB-C docks allowing 4K display output, additional USB ports, networking, and charging from a single cable.

The E480 uses Intel Core processors (up to i7-8550U), and is equipped with the integrated intel UHD 620 graphics card or optionally the AMD RX550 2 GB discrete graphics card. The E480 did not have adequate cooling system on the higher end models, especially those with the dedicated AMD RX 550 graphics card, leading to unit overheating. Lenovo released a firmware update that addressed the problem, but substantially limited the performance of the graphics card.

The E485 is similar to the E480 but it uses an AMD Ryzen processor. The AMD Ryzen processors use Radeon Vega integrated graphics which outperforms similar Intel integrated graphics.

==== 15" (E580, E585) ====
The E580 and E585 have a 15.6-inch display.

The E580 uses Intel Core processors.

The E585 is similar to the E580 but it uses an AMD Ryzen processor.

Model	Release (US)	Dimensions	Weight ^{(min)}	CPU	Chipset	Memory ^{(max)}	Graphics	Storage	Networking	Audio	Screen	Battery	Other	Operating System
14"
E480	2017	329 x 242 x 19.9 mm (12.96 x 9.53 x 0.78 inches)	1.75 kg (3.9 lb)	7th Gen Intel Core or 8th Gen Intel Core		64 GB DDR4 — 2400 MHz (2 slots)	Intel HD 620 or UHD 620 Optional + AMD Radeon RX 550 2 GB	One 2.5" SATA 7mm One M.2 x2	Gigabit Ethernet; Wi-Fi + BT M.2 Card		Anti-glare: 1366×768 TN; 1920×1080 IPS	m	Soldered charging port	Windows 10 Home; Windows 10 Pro
E485	2017		1.75 kg (3.9 lb)	1st Gen AMD Ryzen Mobile		64 GB DDR4 — 2400 MHz (2 slots)	AMD Radeon Vega 3, 8 or 10	One 2.5" SATA 7mm One M.2 x4	Gigabit Ethernet; Wi-Fi + BT M.2 Card		Anti-glare: 1366×768 TN; 1920×1080 IPS	m	Soldered charging port	
15.6"
E580	2017		2.1 kg (4.6 lb)	7th Gen Intel Core or 8th Gen Intel Core		64 GB DDR4 — 2400 MHz (2 slots)	Intel HD 620 or UHD 620 Optional + AMD Radeon RX 550 2 GB	One 2.5" SATA 7mm One M.2 x2	Gigabit Ethernet; Wi-Fi + BT M.2 Card		Anti-glare: 1366×768 TN; 1920×1080 IPS	m	Soldered charging port	
E585	2017		2.1 kg (4.6 lb)	1st Gen AMD Ryzen Mobile		64 GB DDR4 — 2400 MHz (2 slots)	AMD Radeon Vega 3, 8 or 10	One 2.5" SATA 7mm One M.2 x4	Gigabit Ethernet; Wi-Fi + BT M.2 Card		Anti-glare: 1366×768 TN; 1920×1080 IPS	m	Soldered charging port	

=== Gen 9 (2018) ===
The Intel models were announced in 2018. The AMD ones in 2019.

==== 14" (E490, E490s, E495) ====
Lenovo ThinkPad E490, E490s, E495
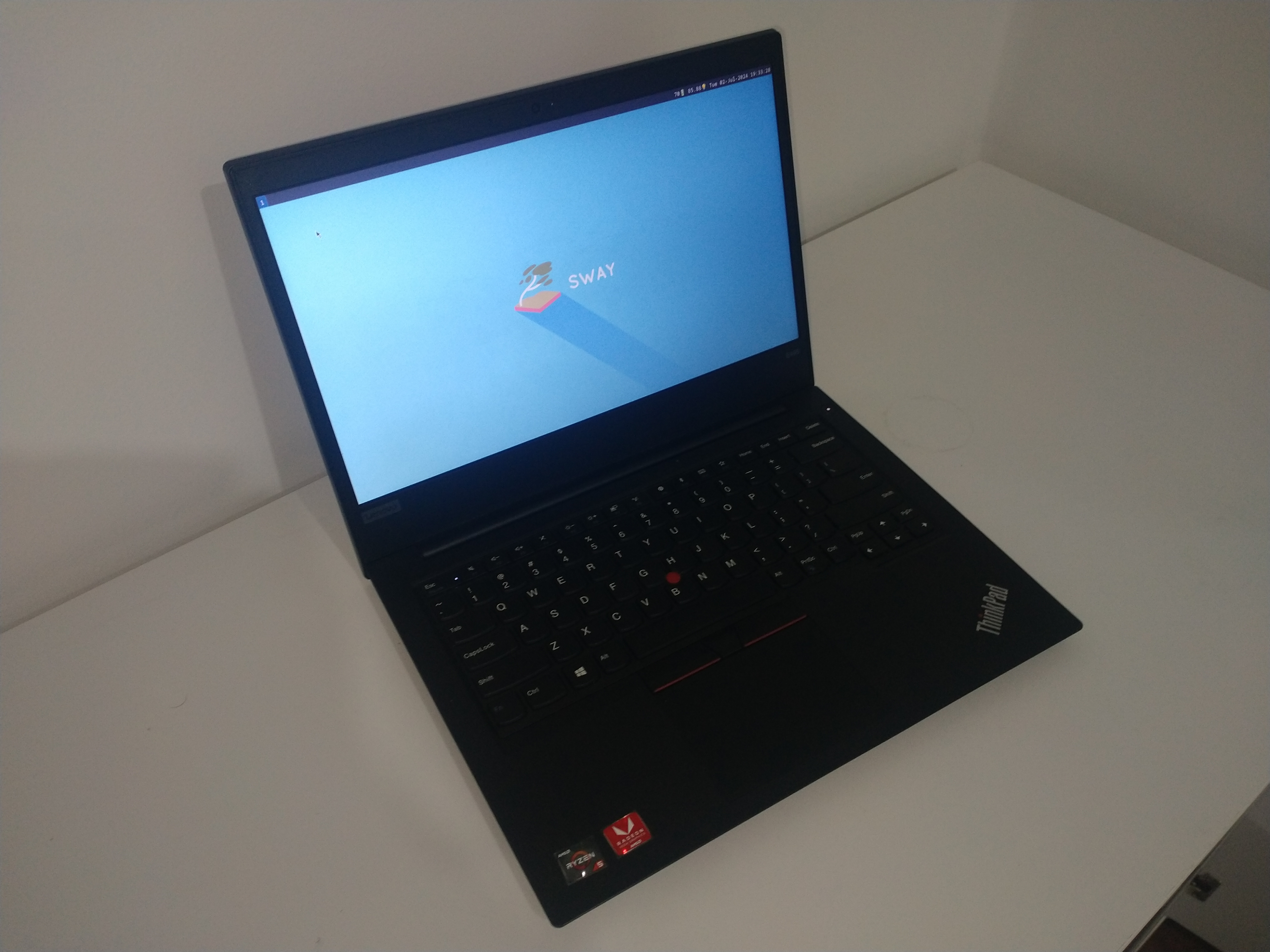
- Lenovo Thinkpad E495 in Sway

The E490, E490s and E495 have a 14-inch display and optionally come with a Windows 10 64-bit system.

The E490 and E490s use 8th Generation Intel Core processors.

The E495 is similar to the E490 but it uses a 3rd gen AMD Ryzen processor.

==== 15" (E590, E595) ====
Lenovo ThinkPad E590, E595

The E590 and E595 have a 15.6-inch display and optionally come with a Windows 10 64-bit system.

The E590 uses 8th Generation Intel Core processors.

The E595 is similar to the E590 but it uses an AMD Ryzen processor.

Model	Release (US)	Dimensions	Weight ^{(min)}	CPU	Chipset	Memory ^{(max)}	Graphics	Storage	Networking	Audio	Screen	Battery	Other	Operating System
14"
E490	2018		1.75 kg (3.9 lb)	8th Gen Intel Core		64 GB DDR4 — 2400 MHz (2 slots)	Intel UHD 620 Optional + AMD Radeon RX 550X 2 GB	One 2.5" SATA 7mm One M.2 x2	Gigabit Ethernet; Wi-Fi + BT M.2 Card		Anti-glare: 1366×768 TN; 1920×1080 IPS	m		
E490s	2018		1.67 kg (3.7 lb)	8th Gen Intel Core		64 GB DDR4 — 2400 MHz (2 slots)	Intel UHD 620 Optional + AMD Radeon RX 540X 2 GB	One M.2 x2	Gigabit Ethernet; Wi-Fi + BT M.2 Card		Anti-glare: 1920×1080 TN; 1920×1080 IPS	m	Soldered charging port	
E495	2019		1.75 kg (3.9 lb)	3rd Gen AMD Ryzen Mobile		64 GB DDR4 — 2400 MHz (2 slots)	AMD Radeon Vega 3, 8 or 10	One 2.5" SATA 7mm One M.2 x4	Gigabit Ethernet; Wi-Fi + BT M.2 Card		Anti-glare: 1366×768 TN; 1920×1080 IPS	m	Soldered charging port	
15.6"
E590	2018		2.12 kg (4.7 lb)	8th Gen Intel Core		64 GB DDR4 — 2400 MHz (2 slots)	Intel UHD 620 Optional + AMD Radeon RX 550X 2 GB	One 2.5" SATA 7mm One M.2 x2	Gigabit Ethernet; Wi-Fi + BT M.2 Card		Anti-glare: 1366×768 TN; 1920×1080 IPS	m		
E595	2019		2.1 kg (4.6 lb)	2nd Gen AMD Ryzen Mobile		64 GB DDR4 — 2400 MHz (2 slots)	AMD Radeon Vega 3, 8 or 10	One 2.5" SATA 7mm One M.2 x4	Gigabit Ethernet; Wi-Fi + BT M.2 Card		Anti-glare: 1366×768 TN; 1920×1080 IPS	m		

=== 2019 ===
The Intel models were announced in October 2019. The AMD ones in May 2020.

==== 14" (E14) ====
The E14 has a 14.0-inch display and optionally come with a Windows 10 Home or Pro 64-bit operating system. It uses 10th Generation Intel Core or 3rd-gen Ryzen Mobile CPUs.

==== 15" (E15) ====
The E15 has a 15.6-inch display and optionally come with a Windows 10 Home or Pro 64-bit operating system. It uses 10th Generation Intel Core or 3rd-gen Ryzen Mobile CPUs.

Model	Release (US)	Dimensions	Weight ^{(min)}	CPU	Chipset	Memory ^{(max)}	Graphics	Storage	Networking	Audio	Screen	Battery	Other	Operating System
14"
E14 Gen 1 (Intel)	2019		1.69 kg (3.7 lb)	10th Gen Intel Core		32 GB DDR4 — 2400 MHz (1 slot)	Intel UHD Graphics; Optional + AMD Radeon 625 or RX 640 2 GB GDDR5	One 2.5" SATA 7mm One M.2 x4	Gigabit Ethernet; Wi-Fi + BT M.2 Card		Anti-glare: 1920×1080 TN; 1920×1080 IPS	m	ThinkShutter	
E14 Gen 1 (AMD)	2020		1.59 kg (3.5 lb)	3rd Gen AMD Ryzen Mobile		36/40 GB DDR4 — 3200 MHz (4/8 GB soldered, 1 slot)	AMD Radeon 7 nm Vega 6 or 7	Two M.2 x4	Gigabit Ethernet; Wi-Fi + BT M.2 Card		Anti-glare: 1920×1080 TN; 1920×1080 IPS	m	ThinkShutter	
15.6"
E15 Gen 1 (Intel)	2019		1.9 kg (4.2 lb)	10th Gen Intel Core		32 GB DDR4 — 2400 MHz (1 slot)	Intel UHD Graphics Optional + AMD Radeon 625 or RX 640 2 GB GDDR5	One 2.5" SATA 7mm One M.2 x4	Gigabit Ethernet; Wi-Fi + BT M.2 Card		Anti-glare: 1920×1080 TN; 1920×1080 IPS	m	ThinkShutter	
E15 Gen 1 (AMD)	2020		1.7 kg (3.7 lb)	3rd Gen AMD Ryzen Mobile		36/40 GB DDR4 — 3200 MHz (4/8 GB soldered, 1 slot)	AMD Radeon 7 nm Vega 6 or 7	Two M.2 x4	Gigabit Ethernet; Wi-Fi + BT M.2 Card		Anti-glare: 1920×1080 TN; 1920×1080 IPS	m	ThinkShutter	

=== 2020 ===
==== E15 Gen 2 (AMD) ====
Model	Release (US)	Dimensions (mm / in)	Weight ^{(min)}	CPU	Chipset	Memory ^{(max)}	Graphics	Storage	Networking	Audio	Screen	Battery	Other	Operating System
14"
E14 Gen 2 (Intel)		324 × 220 × 18.9–20.5; 12.76 × 8.66 × 0.74–0.81	1.59–1.69 kg (3.5–3.7 lb)	11th Gen Intel Core i3-1115G4 i5-1135G7 i7-1165G7		32 GB — DDR4 3200 MHz (1 slot)	Intel UHD G4 or Intel Iris Xe G7; Optional NVIDIA GeForce MX350 / MX450 (2 GB GDDR5)	One M.2 2242 x4 + One M.2 2280 x4	Gigabit Ethernet Wi-Fi 6 + BT 5.1 (soldered); NO WWAN M.2 Card		1920 × 1080 TN 200 nits 1920 × 1080 IPS 250 nits 1920 × 1080 IPS 300 nits 1920 × 1080 IPS 300 nits Touch	m 45Wh	One TB4	
E14 Gen 2 (AMD)		324 × 220 × 18.9–20.5; 12.76 × 8.66 × 0.74–0.81	1.59–1.69 kg (3.5–3.7 lb)	3rd Gen AMD Ryzen Mobile; Ryzen 3 4300U; Ryzen 3 Pro 4500U; Ryzen 5 4600U; Ryzen 5 Pro 4650U; Ryzen 7 4700U; Ryzen 7 4800U		36/40 GB — DDR4 3200 MHz (4/8 GB soldered, 1 slot)	AMD Radeon	One M.2 2242 x4 + One M.2 2280 x4	Gigabit Ethernet Wi-Fi 6 + BT 5.1 (soldered); NO WWAN M.2 Card		1920 × 1080 TN 200 nits 1920 × 1080 IPS 250 nits	m 45Wh	One USB-C 3.2 Gen 1	
15.6"
E15 Gen 2 (Intel)		365 × 240 × 18.9; 14.37 × 9.45 × 0.74	1.7 kg (3.7 lb)	11th Gen Intel Core i3-1115G4 i5-1135G7 i7-1165G7		32 GB — DDR4 3200 MHz (1 slot)	Intel UHD G4 or Intel Iris Xe G7; Optional NVIDIA GeForce MX350 / MX450 (2 GB GDDR5)	One M.2 2242 x4 + One M.2 2280 x4	Gigabit Ethernet Wi-Fi 6 + BT 5.1 (soldered); NO WWAN M.2 Card		1920 × 1080 TN 200 nits 1920 × 1080 IPS 250 nits 1920 × 1080 IPS 300 nits 1920 × 1080 IPS 300 nits Touch	m 45Wh	One TB4	
E15 Gen 2 (AMD)		365 × 240 × 18.9; 14.37 × 9.45 × 0.74	1.7 kg (3.7 lb)	3rd Gen AMD Ryzen Mobile; Ryzen 3 4300U; Ryzen 3 Pro 4500U; Ryzen 5 4600U; Ryzen 5 Pro 4650U; Ryzen 7 4700U; Ryzen 7 4800U		36/40 GB — DDR4 3200 MHz (4/8 GB soldered, 1 slot)	AMD Radeon	One M.2 2242 x4 + One M.2 2280 x4	Gigabit Ethernet Wi-Fi 6 + BT 5.1 (soldered); NO WWAN M.2 Card		1920 × 1080 TN 200 nits 1920 × 1080 IPS 250 nits	m 45Wh	One USB-C 3.2 Gen 1	

=== 2021 ===
==== E15 Gen 3 (AMD) ====
Model	Release (US)	Dimensions (mm / in)	Weight ^{(min)}	CPU	Chipset	Memory ^{(max)}	Graphics	Storage	Networking	Audio	Screen	Battery	Other	Operating System
14"
E14 Gen 3 (AMD)		324 × 220.7 × 17.9–20.9; 12.76 × 8.69 × 0.70–0.82	1.64–1.69 kg (3.6–3.7 lb)	4th Gen AMD Ryzen Mobile; Ryzen 3 5300U; Ryzen 5 Pro 5500U; Ryzen 5 5600U; Ryzen 5 Pro 5650U; Ryzen 7 5700U; Ryzen 7 5800U		36/40 GB — DDR4 3200 MHz (4/8 GB soldered, 1 slot)	AMD Radeon	One M.2 2242 x4 + One M.2 2280 x4	Gigabit Ethernet Wi-Fi 6 + BT 5.1 (soldered); NO WWAN M.2 Card		1920 × 1080 TN 250 nits 1920 × 1080 IPS 250 nits 1920 × 1080 IPS 300 nits	One USB-C 3.2 Gen 1		
15.6"
E15 Gen 3 (AMD)		365 × 240 × 18.9; 14.37 × 9.45 × 0.74	1.7 kg (3.7 lb)	4th Gen AMD Ryzen Mobile; Ryzen 3 5300U; Ryzen 5 Pro 5500U; Ryzen 5 5600U; Ryzen 5 Pro 5650U; Ryzen 7 5700U; Ryzen 7 5800U		36/40 GB — DDR4 3200 MHz (4/8 GB soldered, 1 slot)	AMD Radeon	One M.2 2242 x4 + One M.2 2280 x4	Gigabit Ethernet Wi-Fi 6 + BT 5.1 (soldered); NO WWAN M.2 Card		1920 × 1080 TN 250 nits 1920 × 1080 IPS 250 nits 1920 × 1080 IPS 300 nits	One USB-C 3.2 Gen 1		

=== 2022 ===
==== E15 Gen 4 (AMD) ====
Model	Release (US)	Dimensions (mm / in)	Weight ^{(min)}	CPU	Chipset	Memory ^{(max)}	Graphics	Storage	Networking	Audio	Screen	Battery	Other	Operating System
14"
E14 Gen 4 (Intel)		324 × 220.7 × 17.9–18.9; 12.76 × 8.69 × 0.70–0.74	1.59–1.64 kg (3.5–3.6 lb)	12th Gen Intel Core i3-1215U i5-1235U i5-1245U i7-1255U i5-1240P i7-1260P		32 GB — DDR4 3200 MHz (1 slot) or 40 GB — DDR4 3200 MHz (8 GB soldered, 1 slot)	Intel UHD (i3-1215U) or Intel Iris Xe Optional NVIDIA GeForce MX550 (2 GB GDDR6)	One M.2 2242 3.0 x4 + One M.2 2242 4.0 x4	Gigabit Ethernet Wi-Fi 6 / Wi-Fi 6E + BT 5.1 (soldered); NO WWAN M.2 Card		1920 × 1080 TN 250 nits 1920 × 1080 IPS 300 nits 1920 × 1080 IPS 300 nits Touch	m 42Wh; 57Wh	One TB4	
E14 Gen 4 (AMD)		324 × 220.7 × 17.9–18.9; 12.76 × 8.69 × 0.70–0.74	1.59–1.64 kg (3.5–3.6 lb)	4th Gen AMD Ryzen Mobile; Ryzen 3 5425U; Ryzen 5 5625U; Ryzen 5 Pro 5675U; Ryzen 7 5825U		40 GB — DDR4 3200 MHz (8 GB soldered, 1 slot)	AMD Radeon	One M.2 2242 3.0 x4 + One M.2 2280 3.0 x4	Gigabit Ethernet Wi-Fi 6 / Wi-Fi 6E + BT 5.1 (soldered); NO WWAN M.2 Card		1920 × 1080 TN 250 nits 1920 × 1080 IPS 300 nits	m 42Wh; 57Wh	One USB-C 3.2 Gen 1	
15.6"
E15 Gen 4 (Intel)		365 × 240 × 18.9; 14.37 × 9.45 × 0.74	1.7 kg (3.7 lb)	12th Gen Intel Core i3-1215U i5-1235U i5-1245U i7-1255U i5-1240P i7-1260P		32 GB — DDR4 3200 MHz (1 slot) or 40 GB — DDR4 3200 MHz (8 GB soldered, 1 slot)	Intel UHD (i3-1215U) or Intel Iris Xe Optional NVIDIA GeForce MX550 (2 GB GDDR6)	One M.2 2242 3.0 x4 + One M.2 2242 4.0 x4	Gigabit Ethernet Wi-Fi 6 / Wi-Fi 6E + BT 5.1 (soldered); NO WWAN M.2 Card		1920 × 1080 TN 250 nits 1920 × 1080 IPS 300 nits 1920 × 1080 IPS 300 nits Touch	m 42Wh; 57Wh	One TB4	
E15 Gen 4 (AMD)		365 × 240 × 18.9; 14.37 × 9.45 × 0.74	1.7 kg (3.7 lb)	4th Gen AMD Ryzen Mobile; Ryzen 3 5425U; Ryzen 5 5625U; Ryzen 7 5825U		40 GB — DDR4 3200 MHz (8 GB soldered, 1 slot)	AMD Radeon	One M.2 2242 3.0 x4 + One M.2 2280 3.0 x4	Gigabit Ethernet Wi-Fi 6 / Wi-Fi 6E + BT 5.1 (soldered); NO WWAN M.2 Card		1920 × 1080 TN 250 nits 1920 × 1080 IPS 300 nits	m 42Wh; 57Wh	One USB-C 3.2 Gen 1	

=== 2023 ===
==== E16 Gen 1 (AMD) ====
Model	Release (US)	Dimensions (mm / in)	Weight ^{(min)}	CPU	Chipset	Memory ^{(max)}	Graphics	Storage	Networking	Audio	Screen	Battery	Other	Operating System
14"
E14 Gen 5 (Intel)		313 × 219.3 × 17.99; 12.32 × 8.63 × 0.71	1.41 kg (3.1 lb)	13th Gen Intel Core i3-1315U i5-1335U i5-1340P i5-1345U i5-13500H i5-1355U i5-1360P i7-13700H		40/48 GB — DDR4 3200 MHz (8/16 GB soldered, 1 slot)	Intel UHD (i3-1315U) or Intel Iris Xe Optional NVIDIA GeForce MX550 (2 GB GDDR6)	One M.2 2242 3.0 x4 + One M.2 2242 4.0 x4	Gigabit Ethernet Wi-Fi 6 / Wi-Fi 6E + BT 5.1 (soldered); NO WWAN M.2 Card		1920 × 1200 IPS 300 nits 1920 × 1200 IPS 300 nits Touch; 2240 × 1400 IPS 300 nits	m 47Wh; 57Wh; 63Wh	One TB4; One USB-C 3.2 Gen 2	
E14 Gen 5 (AMD)		313 × 219.3 × 17.99; 12.32 × 8.63 × 0.71	1.41 kg (3.1 lb)	6th Gen AMD Ryzen Mobile; Ryzen 3 7330U; Ryzen 5 5625U; Ryzen 5 7530U; Ryzen 7 7730U		40 GB — DDR4 3200 MHz (8 GB soldered, 1 slot)	AMD Radeon	One M.2 2242 3.0 x4 + One M.2 2280 3.0 x4	Gigabit Ethernet Wi-Fi 6 / Wi-Fi 6E + BT 5.1 (soldered); NO WWAN M.2 Card		1920 × 1200 IPS 300 nits 1920 × 1200 IPS 300 nits Touch; 2240 × 1400 IPS 300 nits	m 47Wh; 57Wh; 63Wh	One USB-C 3.2 Gen 2; One USB-C 3.2 Gen 1	
16"
E16 Gen 1 (Intel)		356.1 × 247.7 × 19.85; 14.02 × 9.75 × 0.78	1.77 kg (3.9 lb)	13th Gen Intel Core i3-1315U i5-1335U i5-1340P i5-1345U i5-13500H i5-1355U i5-1360P i7-1365U i7-13700H		40/48 GB — DDR4 3200 MHz (8/16 GB soldered, 1 slot)	Intel UHD (i3-1315U) or Intel Iris Xe Optional NVIDIA GeForce MX550 (2 GB GDDR6)	One M.2 2242 3.0 x4 + One M.2 2242 4.0 x4	Gigabit Ethernet Wi-Fi 6 / Wi-Fi 6E + BT 5.1 (soldered); NO WWAN M.2 Card		1920 × 1200 IPS 300 nits 1920 × 1200 IPS 300 nits Touch; 2560 × 1600 IPS 400 nits	m 47Wh; 57Wh; 63Wh	One TB4; One USB-C 3.2 Gen 2	
E16 Gen 1 (AMD)		356.1 × 247.7 × 19.85; 14.02 × 9.75 × 0.78	1.77 kg (3.9 lb)	6th Gen AMD Ryzen Mobile; Ryzen 3 7330U; Ryzen 5 7530U; Ryzen 7 7730U		40 GB — DDR4 3200 MHz (8 GB soldered, 1 slot)	AMD Radeon	One M.2 2242 3.0 x4 + One M.2 2280 3.0 x4	Gigabit Ethernet Wi-Fi 6 / Wi-Fi 6E + BT 5.1 (soldered); NO WWAN M.2 Card		1920 × 1200 IPS 300 nits 1920 × 1200 IPS 300 nits Touch; 2560 × 1600 IPS 400 nits	m 47Wh; 57Wh; 63Wh	One USB-C 3.2 Gen 2 One USB-C 3.2 Gen 1	

=== 2024 ===
==== E16 Gen 2 (AMD) ====
Model	Release (US)	Dimensions (mm / in)	Weight ^{(min)}	CPU	Chipset	Memory ^{(max)}	Graphics	Storage	Networking	Audio	Screen	Battery	Other	Operating System
14"
E14 Gen 6 (Intel)		313 × 219.3 × 17.99–18.59; 12.32 × 8.63 × 0.71–0.73	1.42–1.44 kg (3.1–3.2 lb)	Intel Core Ultra Series 1; 5 125H; 5 125U; 5 135U; 7 155H; 7 155U; 7 165U		64 GB — DDR5 5600 MHz (2 slots)	Intel Arc Graphics (H series) or Intel Graphics	One M.2 2242 4.0 x4 + One M.2 2280 4.0 x4	Gigabit Ethernet Wi-Fi 6 / Wi-Fi 6E + BT 5.2 / 5.3 (M.2 Card)	High Definition (HD) Audio, Senary SN6141, stereo speakers with Dolby Atmos within audio by HARMAN and dual-microphone array with smart noise-cancelling	1920 × 1200 IPS 300 nits 1920 × 1200 IPS 300 nits Touch 2560 × 1600 IPS 400 nits	47Wh; 57Wh	One TB4; One USB-C 3.2 Gen 2x2; Optional fingerprint reader; Optional IR camera with Windows Hello support	Windows 11 Home (Single Language), version 23H2; Windows 11 Pro, version 23H2; None
E14 Gen 6 (AMD)		313 × 219.3 × 17.99–18.59; 12.32 × 8.63 × 0.71–0.73	1.42–1.44 kg (3.1–3.2 lb)	AMD Ryzen 7035 Series; 3 7335U; 5 7535HS; 5 7535U; 7 7735HS; 7 7735U		64 GB — DDR5 4800 MHz (2 slots)	AMD Radeon	One M.2 2242 4.0 x4 + One M.2 2280 4.0 x4	Gigabit Ethernet Wi-Fi 6 / Wi-Fi 6E + BT 5.2 / 5.3 (M.2 Card)	High Definition (HD) Audio, Senary SN6141, stereo speakers with Dolby Atmos within audio by HARMAN and dual-microphone array with smart noise-cancelling	1920 × 1200 IPS 300 nits 1920 × 1200 IPS 300 nits Touch 2560 × 1600 IPS 400 nits	47Wh; 57Wh	One USB-C 3.2 Gen 2; One USB-C 3.2 Gen 1; Optional fingerprint reader; Optional IR camera with Windows Hello support	Windows 11 Home (Single Language), version 23H2; Windows 11 Pro, version 23H2; None
16"
E16 Gen 2 (Intel)		356.1 × 247.7 × 19.85–20.20; 14.02 × 9.75 × 0.78–0.80	1.78–1.81 kg (3.9–4.0 lb)	Intel Core Ultra Series 1; 5 125H; 5 125U; 5 135U; 7 155H; 7 155U; 7 165U		64 GB — DDR5 5600 MHz (2 slots)	Intel Arc Graphics (H series) or Intel Graphics	One M.2 2242 4.0 x4 + One M.2 2280 4.0 x4	Gigabit Ethernet Wi-Fi 6 / Wi-Fi 6E + BT 5.2 / 5.3 (M.2 Card)	High Definition (HD) Audio, Senary SN6141, stereo speakers with Dolby Atmos within audio by HARMAN and dual-microphone array with smart noise-cancelling	1920 × 1200 IPS 300 nits 1920 × 1200 IPS 300 nits Touch 2560 × 1600 IPS 400 nits	47Wh; 57Wh	One TB4; One USB-C 3.2 Gen 2x2; Optional fingerprint reader; Optional IR camera with Windows Hello support	Windows 11 Home (Single Language), version 23H2; Windows 11 Pro, version 23H2; None
E16 Gen 2 (AMD)		356.1 × 247.7 × 19.85–20.20; 14.02 × 9.75 × 0.78–0.80	1.78–1.81 kg (3.9–4.0 lb)	AMD Ryzen 7035 Series; 3 7335U; 5 7535HS; 5 7535U; 7 7735HS; 7 7735U		64 GB — DDR5 4800 MHz (2 slots)	AMD Radeon	One M.2 2242 4.0 x4 + One M.2 2280 4.0 x4	Gigabit Ethernet Wi-Fi 6 / Wi-Fi 6E + BT 5.2 / 5.3 (M.2 Card)	High Definition (HD) Audio, Senary SN6141, stereo speakers with Dolby Atmos within audio by HARMAN and dual-microphone array with smart noise-cancelling	1920 × 1200 IPS 300 nits 1920 × 1200 IPS 300 nits Touch 2560 × 1600 IPS 400 nits	47Wh; 57Wh	One USB-C 3.2 Gen 2; One USB-C 3.2 Gen 1; Optional fingerprint reader; Optional IR camera with Windows Hello support	Windows 11 Home (Single Language), version 23H2; Windows 11 Pro, version 23H2; None
