= 450th =

450th may refer to:

- 450th Bombardment Group, an inactive United States Air Force unit formed in 1943 during World War II, inactivated in 1957.
- 450th Bombardment Wing, an inactive United States Air Force unit, activated 1963 and inactivated in 1968.
- 450th Expeditionary Flying Training Squadron (450 EFTS), a provisional United States Air Force unit assigned to the 322d Air Expeditionary Group
- 450th Intelligence Squadron (450 IS), an intelligence unit located at Ramstein AB, Germany

== See also ==
- 450 (number)
- 450, the year 450 (CDL) of the Julian calendar
- 450 BC
