= 45th Street station =

45th Street may refer to:

- 45 Street station (Calgary), a light rail station in Calgary, Alberta, Canada
- 45th Street station (BMT Fourth Avenue Line), New York City, New York
- 45th Street station (Hudson–Bergen Light Rail), Bayonne, New Jersey
- 45th Street station (Tri-Rail), proposed station in West Palm Beach, Florida
