= 45th Regiment =

45th Regiment or 45th Infantry Regiment may refer to:

- 45th Rattray's Sikhs, a unit of the British Indian Army
- 45th (Leeds Rifles) Royal Tank Regiment, a unit of the British Army
- 45th Light Anti-Aircraft Regiment, Royal Artillery, a unit of the British Army
- 45th Garrison Regiment, Royal Artillery, a unit of the British Army
- 45th (Nottinghamshire) (Sherwood Foresters) Regiment of Foot, a unit of the British Army
- 45th Cavalry (India), a unit of the Indian Army
- 45th Infantry Regiment (Imperial Japanese Army)
- 45th Detached Reconnaissance Regiment, a special forces unit of the Russian Army
- 45th Infantry Regiment (United States), a unit of the United States Army

== American Civil War regiments ==
=== Union Army regiments ===
- 45th Illinois Volunteer Infantry Regiment
- 45th Iowa Volunteer Infantry Regiment
- 45th New York Volunteer Infantry Regiment
- 45th Wisconsin Volunteer Infantry Regiment
- 45th Ohio Infantry
- 45th Regiment Kentucky Volunteer Mounted Infantry
- 45th Regiment Massachusetts Volunteer Infantry
- 45th United States Colored Infantry Regiment

=== Confederate Army regiments ===
- 45th Arkansas Infantry (Mounted)
- 45th North Carolina Infantry
- 45th Tennessee Infantry Regiment
- 45th Virginia Infantry

== See also ==
- 45th Division (disambiguation)
- 45th Brigade (disambiguation)
- 45th Squadron (disambiguation)
