= USS Pinafore =

US Navy launch, in service 1902 - 1920

History

United States
- Name: USS Pinafore
- Namesake: The fictional British Royal Navy ship HMS Pinafore in the 1878 Gilbert and Sullivan operetta H.M.S. Pinafore.
- Builder: Mare Island Navy Yard, Vallejo, California
- Completed: 1902
- Commissioned: 1902
- Stricken: 1 July 1920

General characteristics
- Type: Launch
- Displacement: 14.5 tons
- Length: 45 ft (14 m)
- Beam: 12 ft 3 in (3.73 m)
- Speed: 9 knots
- Armament: None

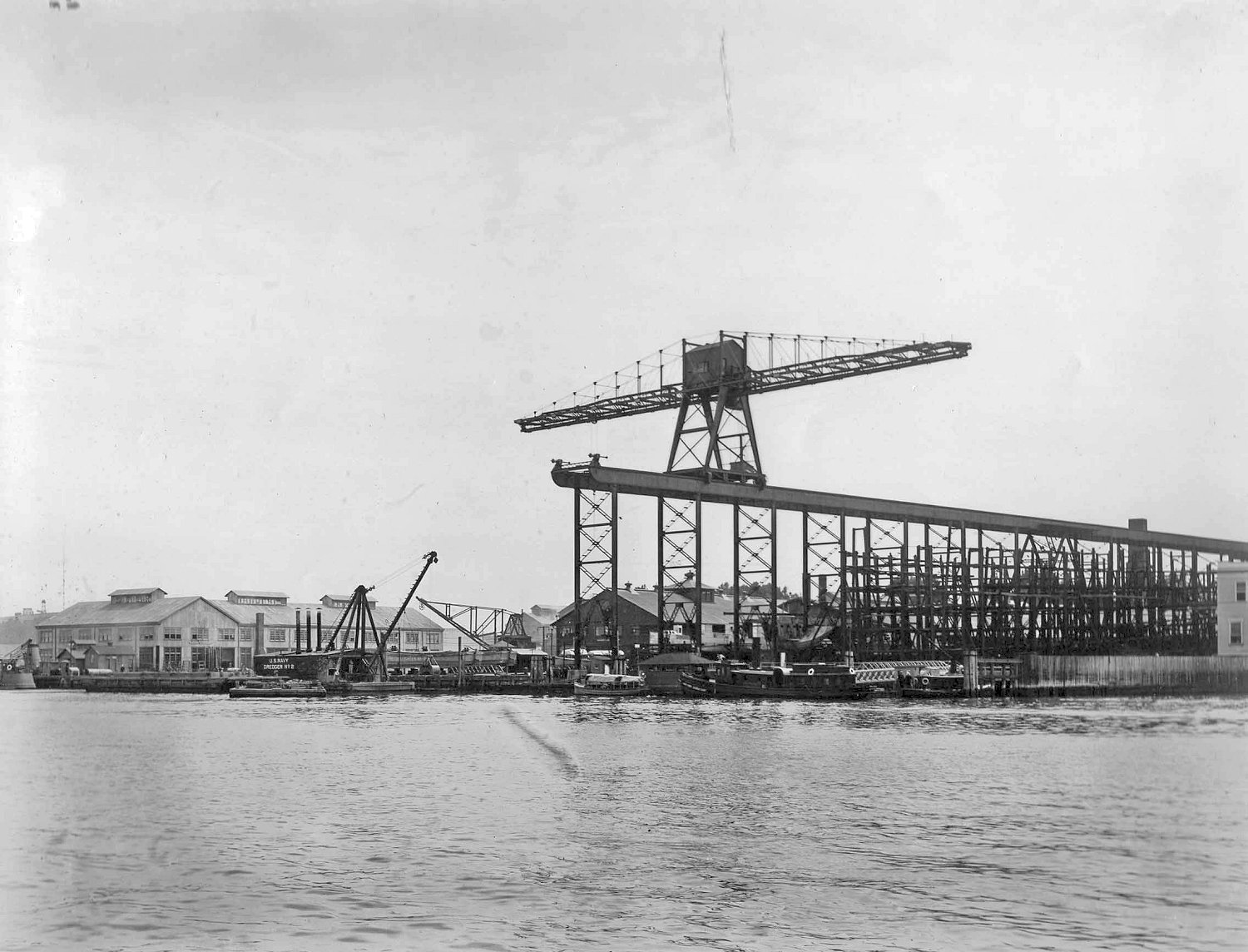
The waterfront at Mare Island Navy Yard, Vallejo, California, sometime between 18 and 31 July 1913. Left to right are the dredger USS Dredger No. 2, the open lighters USS Lighter No. 29 (later USS YC-29) and USS Lighter No. 30 (later USS YC-30) on the seawall behind the dredger, and a small steam launch and the ferry launches USS Dart (later USS Dart (YFB-308)) and USS Pinafore (later designated SP-450). The shipyard's 40-ton drydock crane is to the right of the dredger. The gunboat USS Palos (Gunboat No. 16) (later USS Palos (PG-16)) is on the ways to the left of the cantilever crane and the oiler USS Kanawha (Oiler No. 1) (later USS Kanawha (AO-1)) is on the ways to the right of it.

USS Pinafore (SP-450) was a United States Navy launch in commission from 1902 to 1920.

Pinafore was built in 1902 by the Mare Island Navy Yard at Vallejo, California, as a ferry launch. The Mare Island Navy Yard used her as a construction and repair launch. Around the time the United States entered World War I in April 1917, she received the section patrol registry number SP-450.

Pinafore was stricken from the Navy List on 1 July 1920.
