= 45 Squadron =

45 Squadron or 45th Squadron may refer to:

- No. 45 Squadron RAF, a unit of the United Kingdom Royal Air Force
- 45th Fighter Squadron, a soon to be activated unit of the United States Air Force
- 45th Reconnaissance Squadron, a unit of the United States Air Force
- 45th Airlift Squadron, a unit of the United States Air Force

== See also ==
- 45th Division (disambiguation)
- 45th Brigade (disambiguation)
- 45th Regiment (disambiguation)
