= 45th Brigade =

45th Brigade or 45th Infantry Brigade may refer to:

== Germany ==
- 45th Panzer Brigade (Bundeswehr)

== India ==
- 45th Indian Infantry Brigade
- 45th (Jullundur) Brigade

== Iran ==
- 45th Commando Brigade

== Russia ==
- 45th Guards Spetsnaz Brigade

== Ukraine ==
- 45th Air Assault Brigade (Ukraine)
- 45th Artillery Brigade (Ukraine)

== United Kingdom ==
- 45th Anti-Aircraft Brigade (United Kingdom)
- 45th Brigade (United Kingdom)

== United States ==
- 45th Field Artillery Brigade
- 45th Infantry Brigade Combat Team (United States)
- 45th Sustainment Brigade

== See also ==
- 45th Division (disambiguation)
- 45th Regiment (disambiguation)
- 45th Squadron (disambiguation)
