= 45th Division =

45th Division may refer to:

== Infantry divisions ==
- 45th Airborne Division, People's Republic of China
- 45th Infantry Division (France)
- 45th Reserve Division (German Empire)
- 45th Infantry Division (Wehrmacht), Germany
- 45th Infantry Division (Russian Empire)
- 45th Guards Rifle Division, Soviet Union, later the 45th Guards Motor Rifle Division
- 45th Rifle Division, Soviet Union
- 45th Division (Spain)
- 45th (2nd Wessex) Division, United Kingdom
- 45th Infantry Division (United Kingdom)
- 45th Infantry Division (United States)

== Armoured divisions ==
- 45th Guards Tank Training Division, Soviet Union

== Aviation divisions ==
- 45th Air Division, United States

== See also ==
- List of military divisions by number
- 45th Army (disambiguation)
- 45th Brigade (disambiguation)
- 45th Regiment (disambiguation)
- 45th Squadron (disambiguation)
