= Charles L. Banks =

American Marine Corps Navy Cross recipient

Charles Louis Banks
- Born: July 30, 1914; West Milford, New Jersey, U.S.
- Died: February 22, 1988 (aged 73)
- Relatives: MG Emile P. Moses (father-in-law)
- Military career
- Allegiance: United States of America
- Branch: United States Marine Corps
- Service years: 1936–1959
- Rank: Brigadier General
- Commands: 1st Marine Raider Battalion; 1st Battalion, 24th Marines; 1st Service Battalion; 1st Marine Regiment
- Conflicts: World War II; New Georgia campaign; Battle of Enogai; Battle of Bairoko; Korean War; Battle of Inchon; Second Battle of Seoul; Battle of Chosin Reservoir
- Awards: Navy Cross; Silver Star; Legion of Merit (3); Air Medal

Charles Louis Banks (July 30, 1914 – February 22, 1988) was a United States Marine Corps brigadier general. He was awarded the Navy Cross for his actions at the Battle of Chosin Reservoir during the Korean War.

== Early life and career ==
Charles L. Banks was born on July 30, 1914, in West Milford, New Jersey. He was raised in Newark and was appointed to the Virginia Military Institute upon graduating high school. At VMI, he studied artillery and liberal arts, graduating 5th in his class in 1936.

Banks was subsequently commissioned as a second lieutenant in the Marine Corps and was assigned to the 10th Marines at Parris Island, South Carolina. By 1939, his battery moved to San Diego, California and joined the 15th Marines. There, he met and married Elizabeth A. Moses, the daughter of Brigadier General Emile P. Moses. Banks then attended the U.S. Army's field artillery school at Fort Sill, Oklahoma. Afterwards, he served as an instructor of the Aerial Observer Course at Marine Corps Base Quantico.

== World War II ==
In January 1942, Captain Banks was assigned to the Amphibious Force, Atlantic Fleet, then headed by General Holland Smith. In August 1942, Smith and Banks both transferred to Amphibious Corps, Pacific Fleet. In October, Major Banks was appointed as the executive officer of the 4th Marine Raider Battalion.

The 4th Marine Raider Battalion arrived at Espiritu Santo Island in March 1943, where it joined the three other raider battalions to form the 1st Marine Raider Regiment. Banks transferred to the 1st Marine Raider Battalion in April, replacing Lieutenant Colonel Samuel B. Griffith as the executive officer. The regiment moved to Guadalcanal in May, where the Marines prepared for the invasion of New Georgia.

On the night of July 4, Banks and the other raiders made an amphibious assault at Rice Anchorage. On July 9, Banks organized and led a patrol and led it forward of the front lines at Enogai, aggressively engaging the Japanese. This action enabled his regimental commander, Colonel Harry B. Liversedge, to escape from an untenable position.

On July 20, his battalion attacked Bairoko. After fierce fighting for seven hours, Banks reconnoitered a trail which allowed the wounded to be evacuated and supplies to be delivered. The battalion withdrew the next day, and Banks later rode a surfboat across the enemy-held Bairoko Harbor to rescue three men who were adrift in the Kula Gulf.

In August, the Marine Raiders withdrew from New Georgia and returned to Guadalcanal, where he contracted a tropical disease in September. In October, Major Banks took command of the 1st Marine Raider Battalion and later went to New Zealand with his battalion to go on liberty. In January 1944, Banks was awarded the Silver Star and his first Legion of Merit for his actions at New Georgia.

In February 1944, the 1st Marine Raider Battalion was redesignated as the 4th Marine Regiment at Guadalcanal. Banks was later promoted to lieutenant colonel before returning to the United States in May. He was assigned to Headquarters, Fleet Marine Force Pacific in San Diego. In April 1945, Banks took command of the 1st Battalion, 24th Marines, holding this position until the end of the war.

== Korean War ==
After World War II, Banks was stationed at Camp Pendleton and then at the Boston Navy Yard. When the Korean War broke out, Lieutenant Colonel Banks was given command of the 1st Service Battalion, 1st Marine Division. Banks quickly reorganized his battalion and led his Marines in the amphibious assault at Inchon in mid-September 1950.

He continued leading his battalion during the subsequent recapture of Seoul by the end of the month, and the landing at Wonsan in October. Banks' outstandingly led his battalion, supplying the 1st Marine Division and the 7th Infantry Division along with several other regiments. For his service, he earned his second Legion of Merit.

In November, Lieutenant Colonel Banks' battalion and the rest of the 1st Marine Division marched north and were in the Chosin Reservoir area by the end of the month. On the morning of November 29, a Chinese regiment from the 58th Division assaulted the supply dump area of Banks' battalion. Banks reacted quickly and deployed his Marines in a defensive perimeter, inflicting heavy casualties on the enemy and successfully repulsing the attack.

A second and more determined enemy assault followed, in which the perimeter was penetrated and several oil dumps caught fire from mortar fire. Despite this, Lieutenant Colonel Banks led his Marines in repulsing this second attack. Banks then organized his remaining Marines and led them in inflicting over 50 percent casualties on the enemy regiment over the next week. For his actions during the Chosin Reservoir campaign, Banks was awarded the Navy Cross.

In January 1951, Banks was appointed as the Assistant Chief of Staff, G-4, 1st Marine Division. He held this position until May when he returned to the United States. He was also promoted to colonel and awarded his third Legion of Merit for his service.

== Later career and life ==
In the fall of 1954, Colonel Banks began attending the University of Utah where he studied law and commanded the NROTC. From November 1957 to January 1959, he served as the commanding officer of the 1st Marine Regiment. After completing his assignment, Banks retired as a brigadier general from the Marine Corps at Camp Pendleton.

After retirement, Banks worked for the Kaiser Engineering Company in Oakland, California. He died on February 22, 1988.

== See also ==
- List of Navy Cross recipients for the Korean War

Military offices
Preceded by George W. Herring	Commanding Officer of the 1st Marine Raider Battalion; October 3, 1943 – February 1, 1944	Succeeded by Unit redesignated
Preceded by William A. Kengla	Commanding Officer of the 1st Marine Regiment; November 12, 1957 – January 5, 1959	Succeeded by Clarence R. Schwenke
