= Bairoko =

Bairoko may refer to:

- Bairoko Harbor, a harbor on the northwestern shore of the island of New Georgia in the Solomon Islands
- The Battle of Bairoko, a World War II battle between American and Japanese forces on July 20, 1943, during the New Georgia campaign in the Solomon Islands
- USS Bairoko (CVE-115), a US Navy escort aircraft carrier in commission from July 1945 to April 1950 and from September 1950 to February 1955
