= USS Strong =

Two ships of the United States Navy have borne the name USS Strong, in honor of Rear Admiral James H. Strong (1814–1882), who distinguished himself at the Battle of Mobile Bay.

- The first, USS Strong (DD-467), was a Fletcher-class destroyer, launched in 1941 and sunk in action in 1943.
- The second, USS Strong (DD-758), was an Allen M. Sumner-class destroyer, launched in 1944 and struck in 1973.
