= USS Strong (DD-467) =

Fletcher-class destroyer

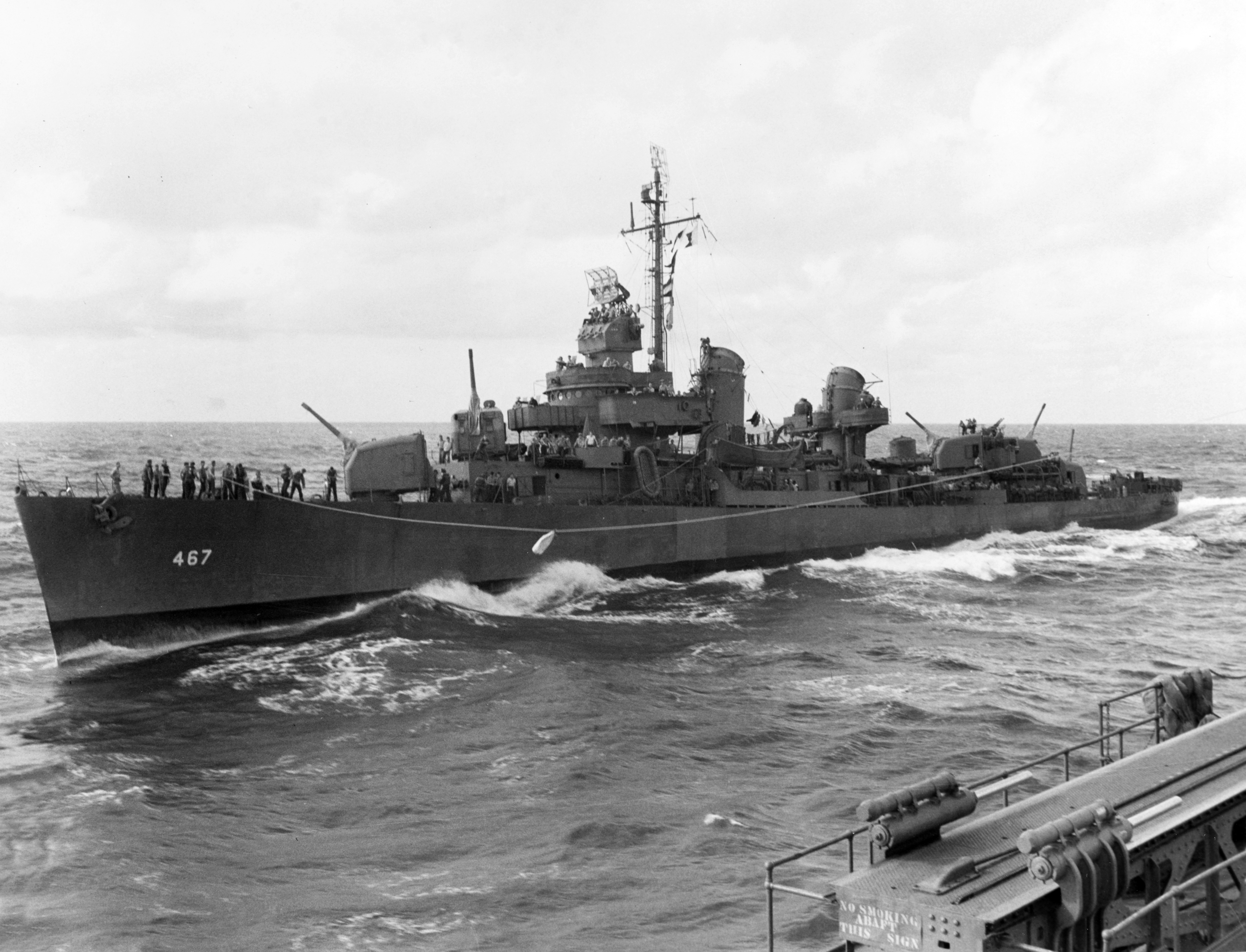
- USS Strong highlines mail to USS Honolulu during operations in the Solomon Islands area, c. early July 1943

History

United States
- Name: Strong
- Namesake: Rear Admiral James Hooker Strong
- Builder: Bath Iron Works
- Laid down: 30 April 1941
- Launched: 17 May 1942
- Commissioned: 7 August 1942
- Stricken: 15 July 1943
- Fate: Sunk in action, 5 July 1943

General characteristics
- Class & type: Fletcher-class destroyer
- Displacement: 2,050 tons
- Length: 376 ft 6 in (114.76 m)
- Beam: 39 ft 8 in (12.09 m)
- Draft: 17 ft 9 in (5.41 m)
- Propulsion: 60,000 shp (45,000 kW); 2 propellers
- Speed: 35 knots (65 km/h; 40 mph)
- Range: 6,500 nmi (12,000 km; 7,500 mi) at 15 knots (28 km/h; 17 mph)
- Complement: 329
- Armament: 5 × single Mk 12 5 in (127 mm)/38 guns; 5 × twin 40 mm (1.6 in) Bofors AA guns; 7 × single 20 mm (0.8 in) Oerlikon AA guns; 2 × quintuple 21 in (533 mm) torpedo tubes; 6 × single depth charge throwers; 2 × depth charge racks

USS Strong (DD-467), was a Fletcher-class destroyer and the first ship of the United States Navy to be named after Rear Admiral James H. Strong (1814–1882), who rammed the Confederate ironclad CSS Tennessee during the Battle of Mobile Bay, receiving a commendation and promotion to captain.

== Construction and commissioning ==
Strong was laid down on 30 April 1941 at Bath, Maine, by Bath Iron Works, launched on 17 May 1942, sponsored by Mrs. Hobart Olson, and commissioned on 7 August 1942.

== History ==
After completing her shakedown cruise and working-up, Strong sailed on 15 October with a convoy to San Juan, Puerto Rico returning to Norfolk, Virginia, on the 27th and departing two days later for New York. On 13 November, she sailed with convoy UGS-2 bound for North African ports. She arrived at Casablanca on 29 November and returned to New York with convoy GUF-2. Following a yard availability period, 11 to 26 December, the destroyer moved to Norfolk.

Strong sailed on 27 December 1942; transited the Panama Canal; refueled at Bora Bora, Society Islands; and arrived at Noumea on 27 January 1943. Strong then escorted a convoy northwest for two days and was relieved to return to Nouméa. On 1 February, she and USS Cony escorted a convoy bound for Espiritu Santo, New Hebrides. She sailed from there on 5 February for the Solomon Islands and patrolled off Guadalcanal until the 13th when she joined Task Force 67 (TF 67) composed of four cruisers and their destroyer screen.

The task force devoted most of the next month to patrol duty in waters in and around the Solomons. On 14 March, Strong, Nicholas, Radford, and Taylor were detached to shell shore installations on Kolombangara island and targets on Vila Stanmore Plantation on 16 March. The force then resumed patrol duties in the Solomons. On the morning of 5 April, Strong made a surface radar contact at a range of 9,350 yards (8,550 m). The target was illuminated by her searchlight and assessed to be the Japanese submarine Ro-34. Strong and the destroyer O'Bannon opened fire, claiming three 5-inch (127 mm) hits. The submarine, settled by the stern and sank. Strong dropped two patterns of depth charges and her crew observed debris rising to the surface at 10°05′S 162°08′E.

Strong, with TF 18, accompanied three destroyers minelayers to Blackett Strait, between Kolombangara and Arundel Island and mined it in the early morning hours of 7 May. The next morning, four Japanese destroyers sailed around Kolombangara strait and into the minefield. One was sunk, two were damaged and later sunk by aircraft, the fourth was badly damaged but managed to escape.

On the night of 12–13 May, Strong and the task force bombarded Kolombangara, then commenced escort and patrol duty off Guadalcanal. On the afternoon of 16 June, she was halfway between Guadalcanal and Tulagi when a flight of approximately 15 Japanese dive bombers attacked the American ships. Strong was the closest ship to the bombers as they approached in a shallow dive and she claimed three shot down.

On the morning of 5 July, American forces landed at Rice Anchorage. Strong and TF 18 were to support the landings by shelling Vila-Stanmore, Enogai, and Bairoko. Strong and Nicholas entered Bairoko Harbor to search ahead of the main force and shelled the harbour from 00:30 to 00:40. Nine minutes later, a torpedo hit her port side. The torpedo was from a salvo fired by the Japanese destroyer Niizuki, from a distance of 11 nautical miles (20 km; 13 mi) and is believed to be the longest-range torpedo kill in history. Chevalier intentionally rammed Strong's bow to enable her to throw nets and lines to the stricken ship, and rescued 241 men. Japanese gunners on Enogai beach spotted the ships, illuminated them with star shells, and opened fire with high explosive rounds. O'Bannon began a counter-battery fire at the enemy guns that were hitting Strong and Chevalier who were forced to withdraw.

Strong began to settle rapidly with a 40° to 60° list to starboard, she broke in half just prior to sinking and several of her depth charges exploded. Forty-six men were killed and she was struck from the Navy list on 15 July 1943.

=== Wreck discovered ===
In mid-February 2019, the research vessel Petrel located the wreck in 300 meters (980 ft) meters of water. The ship is well broken up with the heavily damaged forward part of the ship resting on its port side in a compact debris field that contains the rest of the ship, including her fairly well-preserved wheelhouse, torpedo tubes, propellers and propeller shafts, 5" guns, boilers, and at least one intact funnel.

== Honors ==
Strong received two battle stars for World War II service.
