= USS Strong (DD-758) =

Allen M. Sumner-class destroyer of the United States Navy

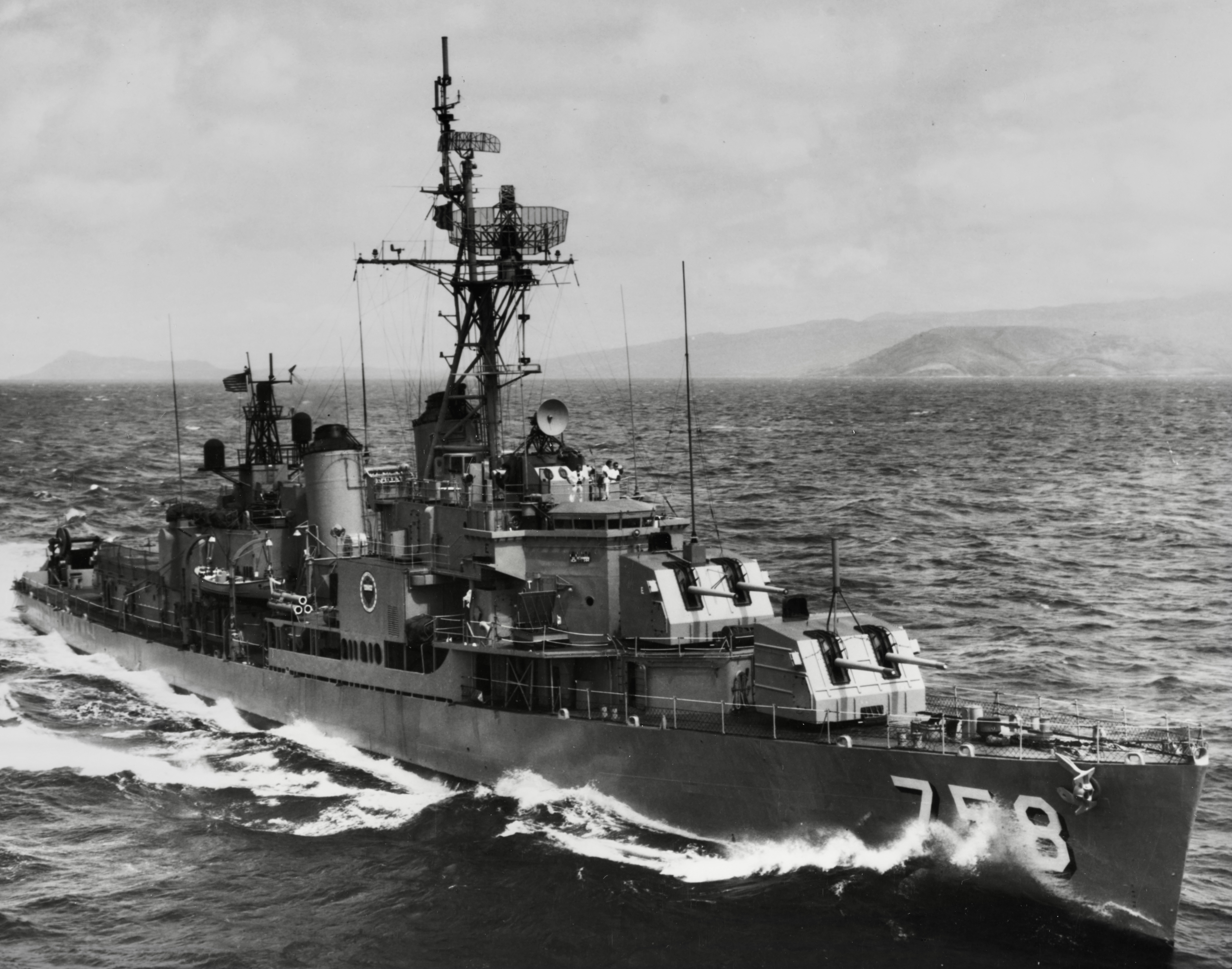
- USS Strong

History

United States
- Name: Strong
- Namesake: James H. Strong
- Builder: Bethlehem Steel, San Francisco
- Laid down: 25 July 1943
- Launched: 23 April 1944
- Commissioned: 8 March 1945
- Decommissioned: 31 October 1973
- Stricken: 31 October 1973
- Motto: Virtute Et Armis
- Fate: Sold to Brazil, 31 October 1973

Brazil
- Name: Rio Grande do Norte
- Acquired: 31 October 1973
- Stricken: 1996
- Identification: D 37
- Fate: Reportedly sunk in high seas in 1997 off the coast of Durban, South Africa, while she was under tow from Brazil to India to be scrapped

General characteristics
- Class & type: Allen M. Sumner-class destroyer
- Displacement: 2,200 tons
- Length: 376 ft 6 in (114.76 m)
- Beam: 40 ft (12 m)
- Draft: 15 ft 8 in (4.78 m)
- Propulsion: 60,000 shp (45,000 kW); 2 propellers
- Speed: 34 knots (63 km/h; 39 mph)
- Range: 6,500 nmi (12,000 km; 7,500 mi) at 15 kn (28 km/h; 17 mph)
- Complement: 336
- Armament: 6 × 5 in (127 mm)/38 cal. guns, 12 × 40 mm AA guns, 11 × 20 mm AA guns, 10 × 21 inch (533 mm) torpedo tubes, 6 × depth charge projectors, 2 × depth charge tracks

USS Strong (DD-758), an Allen M. Sumner-class destroyer, was the second ship of the United States Navy to be named for James H. Strong, a naval commander for Union forces during the American Civil War. At the Battle of Mobile Bay, he was the first to ram the Confederate ironclad Tennessee and received high commendation for his initiative and valor.

== Service history ==
The second Strong was laid down on 25 July 1943 by Bethlehem Steel Co., San Francisco, California and launched on 23 April 1944; sponsored by Mrs. Hobart Olson. The ship was commissioned on 8 March 1945. Strong began her shakedown cruise in the San Diego Bay area on 27 March and on 11 May underwent a short period of post-shakedown availability there. On 31 May she stood out of port en route to Pearl Harbor. Training exercises were held off Oahu from 6 to 20 June when she departed to begin escort duty for convoys between the Marshall and Caroline Islands. From 27 July to 31 August, she served as convoy escort and antisubmarine screen in the Ryukyu Islands. She entered Japanese home waters to patrol air-sea rescue stations on 1 September and later served as courier between Wakayama, Nagoya, and Yokosuka. On 5 December 1945, the destroyer was ordered to sail to the east coast and join the Atlantic Fleet.

=== 1946–1952 ===
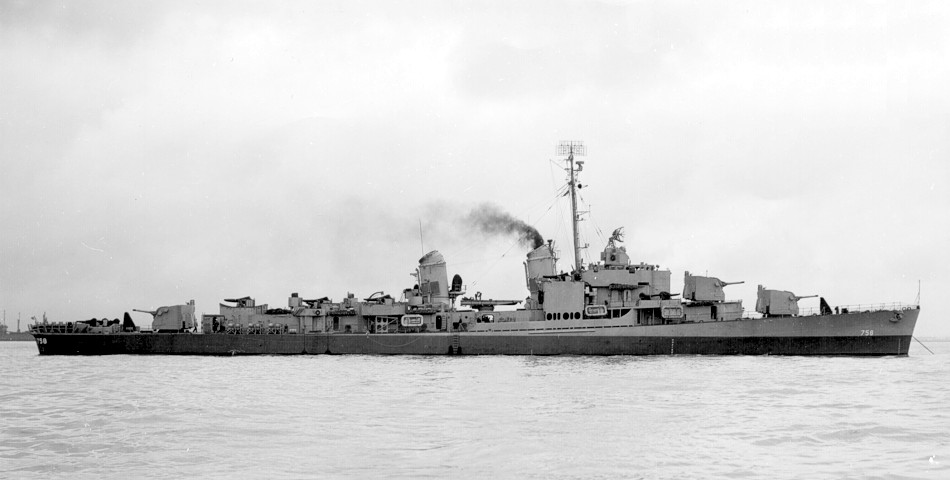
USS Strong in 1945

Strong transited the Panama Canal on 11 January 1946 and arrived at New York on 15 January. After a period of upkeep and repairs, she operated along the northeast coast until rapid demobilization kept her at Boston from 29 April until 1 August. She put to sea again and operated with the fleet as far south as the Gulf of Mexico until she sailed into Charleston, South Carolina, for inactivation and berthing. The destroyer was placed in reserve, out of commission, on 9 May 1947 as a unit of the Atlantic Reserve Fleet.

Strong was placed in commission again on 14 May 1949 and held shakedown training in Guantanamo Bay, Cuba, during September and October. Her homeport was designated as Norfolk, Virginia, and she sailed from there with 2nd Fleet units for operations near the Arctic Circle. Fleet exercises Portrex and Carribex were held during March 1950 and, during June and July, Strong embarked midshipmen and reservists for a training cruise to Panama and Cuba. In late July, she sailed for the Mediterranean Sea and her first deployment with the 6th Fleet which lasted until February 1951. Routine fleet duties followed until 15 May 1952 when she steamed from Norfolk with Destroyer Divisions (DesDiv) 21 and 262 for the Korean War Zone, via Panama, San Diego, Pearl Harbor, and Yokosuka.

=== Korea ===
Strong sailed from Yokosuka on 19 June for Korean waters and was attached to Task Force (TF) 77 which launched the first attacks against the hydroelectric plants on the Yalu River five days later. The destroyer was in Japan from 9 July to 13 September and returned to Korean waters where she operated until 9 October. During her tour in Korea, she conducted gun strikes up and down the east coast; served with the United Nations Blockade and Escort Group on the west coast; and was at Pusan, Songjin, and Wonsan.

On 9 October, Strong sailed to Yokosuka on her way back to Norfolk via Singapore, Ceylon, Bahrain, Aden, Suez, Naples, and Villefranche, She arrived at her home port on 12 December 1952. Strong operated along the East Coast until early January 1954 when she stood out of Norfolk for another tour in the Far East and another world cruise which did not see her back in her homeport until 10 August. She resumed her routine duties along the East Coast until 13 August 1956 when she sailed for another four-month deployment period with the 6th Fleet. The destroyer was deployed to the 6th Fleet again in 1957, 1958, and 1961. In 1959 she saved 13 Bahrainis in the Persian Gulf during a severe storm. She also participated in Project Mercury and on 9 September 1959 recovered the Big Joe 1 capsule off Puerto Rico.

=== FRAM II ===
Strong entered the Charleston Naval Shipyard in March 1962 for FRAM II conversion and remained there until December. She held refresher training at Guantanamo Bay in early 1963 and then participated in exercises off Nova Scotia. The destroyer was deployed to the 6th Fleet from November 1963 to March 1964; 6 January to 7 June 1965; and from 22 September 1966 to 31 January 1967. The last of these deployments was to the Mediterranean. She visited Gibraltar, Marseille, Naples, Athens, Istanbul, and Taranto. On 8 December 1966 she participated in search and rescue operations in the Aegean Sea for victims of the capsized Greek ferry SS Heraklion. She operated along the East Coast until 1 November 1967 when she sailed with Destroyer Squadron 4 for the western Pacific and duty in Vietnam.

=== Vietnam ===
Strong sailed from Subic Bay, Philippines, on 15 December 1967 as screen for the aircraft carrier Coral Sea en route to her first assignment in Vietnam, Operation "Sea Dragon." From 18 December 1967 to 2 January 1968, she was on the gunline conducting harassment and interdiction missions against North Vietnamese water borne logistic craft. From 3 January to 5 February she operated at "Yankee Station."

Strong was ordered to the Sea of Japan from 23 February 1968 to 6 March after the North Koreans seized USS Pueblo. She was back off Vietnam on 2 April and assigned to duties in the III Corps Tactical Zone and Rung Sat Special Zone. During the first two weeks, she sank 20 enemy sampans as well as providing fire support. From 22 April to 1 May, Strong served as II Corps naval gunfire support ship, firing against Viet Cong targets in the Phan Thiết area. On 1 May, she sailed for the East Coast, via Okinawa, Japan, Midway, Hawaii, California, Mexico, and the Panama Canal, and arrived at Charleston on 4 August.

Strong sailed on 11 September 1968 to participate in NATO exercise Operation "Silver Tower" in the Norwegian Sea. After a visit to Gravesend, England, she returned to Charleston on 15 October 1968 and remained there until 9 January 1969 when she resumed routine peacetime training. On 12 November 1969, the destroyer was again deployed to the 6th Fleet for a six-month tour and returned to her home port on 23 May 1970. Much of the remainder of the year was spent in port and she was again deployed to the 6th Fleet from 16 April to 16 October 1971. On 16 November, she was transferred to the Naval Reserve Force and became a unit of DesRon 34. Strong operated as a Naval Reserve training ship until September 1973 when she entered a standdown period at Charleston.

== Brazilian service ==
Strong was decommissioned and struck from the Navy list on 31 October 1973. She was transferred to the government of Brazil the same day as Rio Grande do Norte (D-37) and served until 1996.

== Battle stars ==
Strong received one battle star for Korean service and three battle stars for service in Vietnam.
