= Emile P. Moses =

American Marine Corps Major General

Emile Phillips Moses
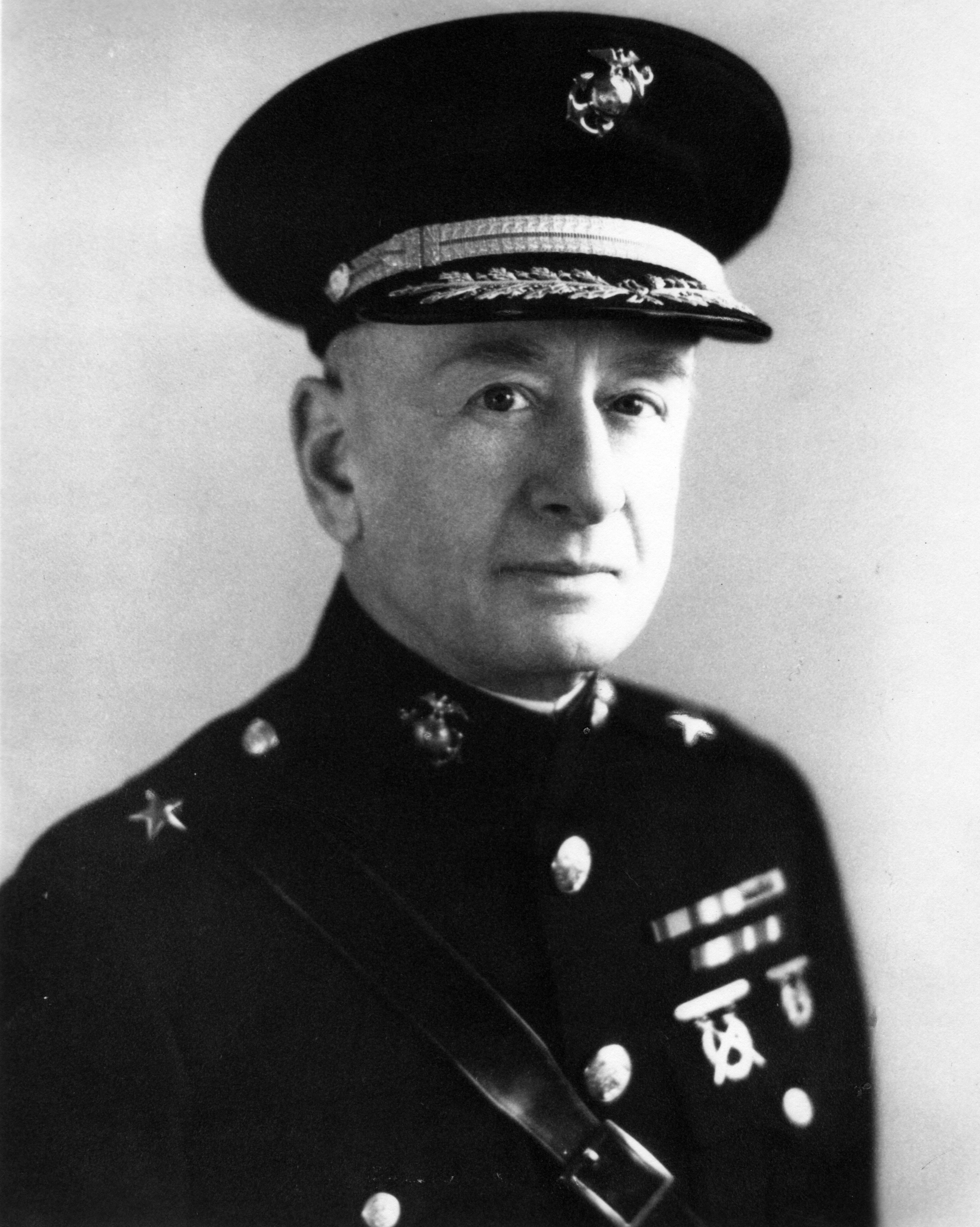
- Moses as Brigadier general, USMC
- Born: May 27, 1880; Sumter, South Carolina, US
- Died: December 22, 1965 (aged 85); La Jolla, California, US
- Burial place: Arlington National Cemetery
- Relatives: BG Charles L. Banks (son-in-law)
- Military career
- Allegiance: United States of America
- Branch: United States Marine Corps
- Service years: 1904–1944
- Rank: Major general
- Commands: MCRD Parris Island; 2nd Marine Brigade; Marine Barracks, Washington, D.C. 4th Marine Regiment; 1st Battalion, 10th Marines
- Conflicts: Nicaraguan Campaign of 1912: Battle of Coyotepe Hill; Veracruz Expedition; Yangtze Patrol; World War II

Emile Phillips Moses (May 27, 1880 – December 22, 1965) was a distinguished officer in the United States Marine Corps with the rank of major general. A veteran of forty years of service and several expeditionary campaigns, Moses is most noted for his service as commanding general, Marine Corps Recruit Depot Parris Island during World War II and for his efforts in the developing of Marine Corps Amphibious Warfare doctrine, especially Landing Vehicle Tracked.

== Early career ==
Emile P. Moses was born on May 27, 1880, in Sumter, South Carolina, as the son of Jewish businessman Altamont Moses and Octavia Cohen. His father, Confederate Army veteran, had established the business as a cotton grower and also owned a life and fire insurance agency. Emile attended the Sumter Military Academy and subsequently enrolled the University of South Carolina, where he graduated with Bachelor of Arts degree in literary in June 1899.

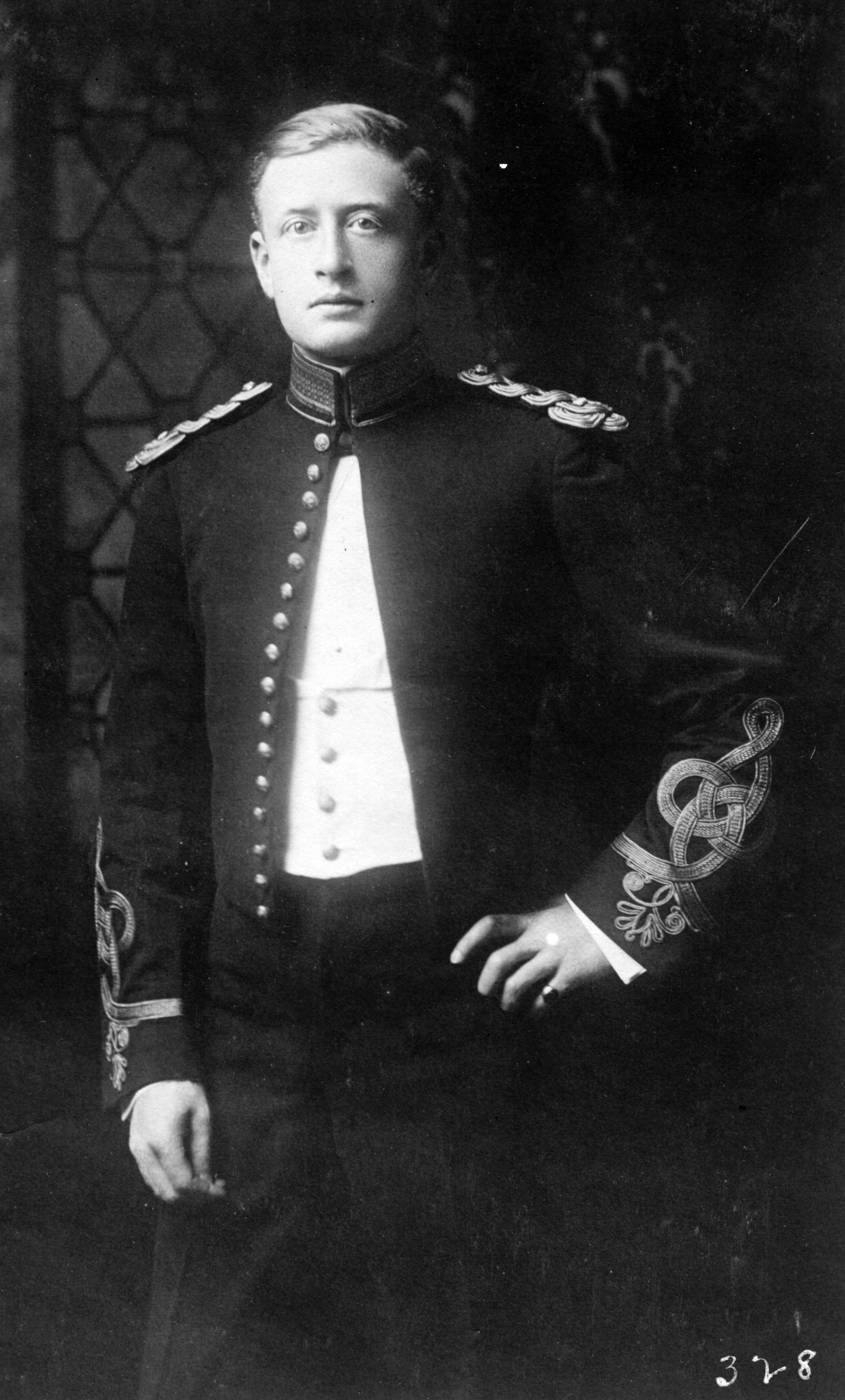
Moses as first lieutenant in January 1908.

He then attended the Georgia Institute of Technology for one year, before accepted a job as Coach of football team at Sumter Military Academy in 1901. Moses remained in that capacity until April 23, 1904, when he entered the Marine Corps and was commissioned second lieutenant. He was ordered to the School of Application at Annapolis, Maryland, for basic officer training, which he completed at the beginning of February 1905.

Moses was then ordered to the Marine barracks at New York Navy Yard, where he remained until December of that year, when he embarked for Panama Canal Zone for guard duty following the elections of first Panamian President, Manuel Amador Guerrero. He remained in that capacity until December 1906, when he returned to the United States for duty at Marine Barracks at Boston Navy Yard and was promoted to first lieutenant on January 1, 1908.

He was ordered back to Panama in June 1908 during an election disturbances and remained in that country until August of that year, when the emergency was called off. Moses then returned to Boston and remained there until January 1909, when he sailed for Hawaii, where he was stationed at Marine Barracks, Honolulu until November 1910. He was then attached to the Marine detachment aboard the armored cruiser USS Washington and took part in the patrol cruises off the East Coast of the United States and later in the Cuban waters. He also saw action in Cuba during the putting down of an insurrection and in protecting American interests from dissident groups.

Moses was detached from sea duties in October 1911 and served as an instructor at the Advanced Base School at Philadelphia Navy Yard until August 1912. He was then attached to the Marine expeditionary forces under Colonel Joseph H. Pendleton and sailed for Nicaragua in order to protect American interests during the failed Coup d'état led by anti-government forces under former Nicaraguan Secretary of War Luis Mena. Moses participated in the bombardment, assault and capture of Coyotepe Hill fortifications and in the capture and occupation of the City of León.

Following the suppression of the rebellion, Moses returned to the United States in November 1912 and assumed duty at Marine Barracks, Puget Sound Navy Yard, Washington. While in this capacity, he was promoted to captain on July 12, 1914, and assumed command of the Marine detachment aboard the cruiser USS Galveston. He took part in the support operations during the Veracruz Expedition in fall 1914 and then sailed for Guam. Captain Moses participated with Galveston in the convoy duty between the Philippines and Guam until June 1916, when he was ordered back to the United States.

Upon the United States declaration of War on Germany in April 1917, Moses was promoted to the temporary rank of major on May 22, and assumed duty at Marine Barracks, Quantico, Virginia. He remained in that capacity for the remainder of the war and participated in the training of Marines heading for combat in France. He was made a permanent major on October 7, 1918.

== Interwar period ==
Following the War, Moses was transferred to the Marine barracks at Naval Station Pearl Harbor in May 1919 and remained there until October 1921, when he was sent to the Marine Corps Base San Diego, California. While there, he joined the 5th Marine Brigade under his old superior from Nicaragua, Brigadier General Joseph H. Pendleton and served with that command until November 1923, when he was ordered back to Quantico.

In September 1925, Moses was ordered for instruction at Army Field Artillery School at Fort Sill, Oklahoma. Upon the graduation from the advanced course in July of the following year, he returned to Quantico and joined the 10th Marine Artillery Regiment as operations and training officer. Moses was ordered to Chicago in October of that year and assumed command of lst District, U. S. Mail Guard during a wave of robberies.

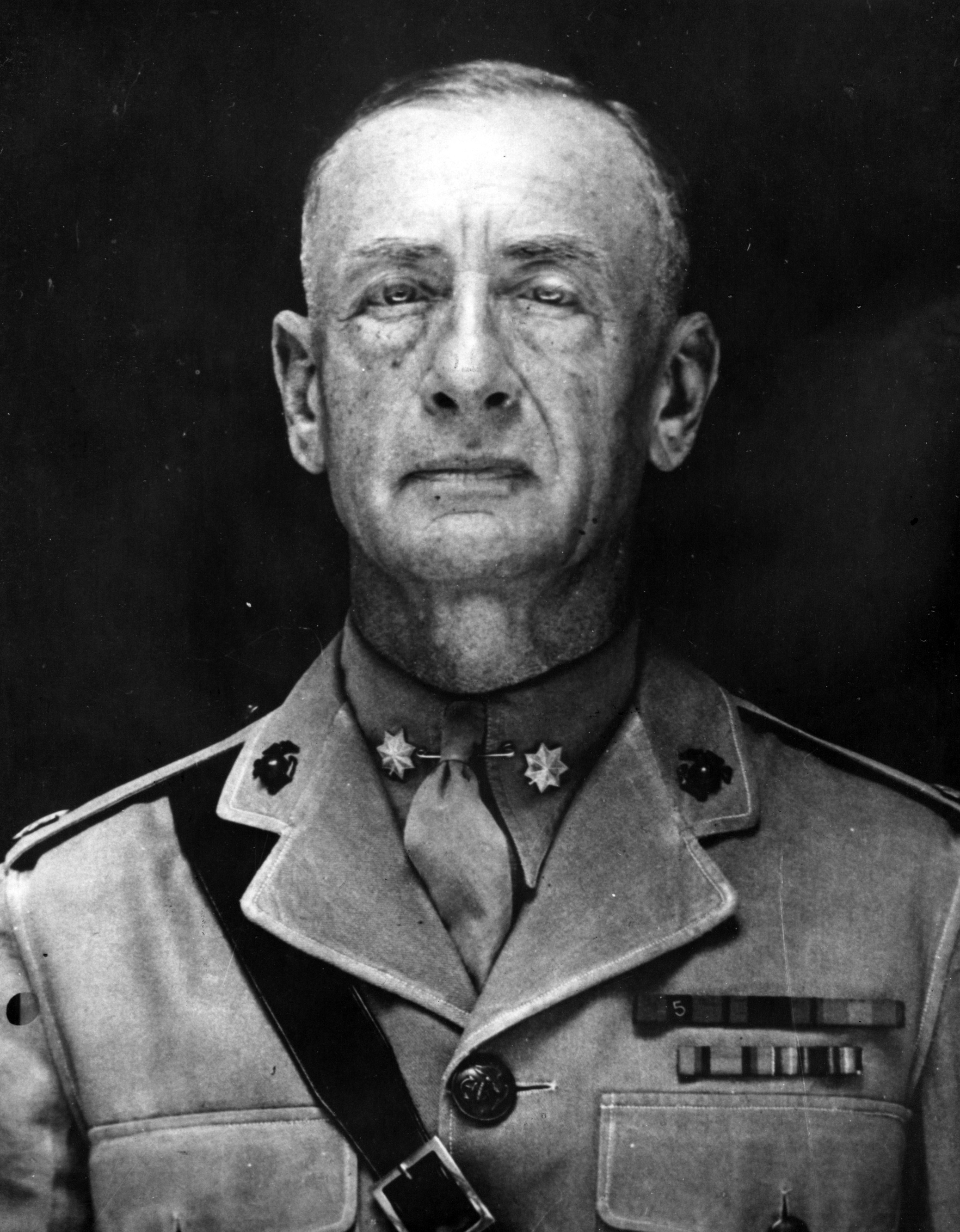
Moses as lieutenant colonel in August 1934.

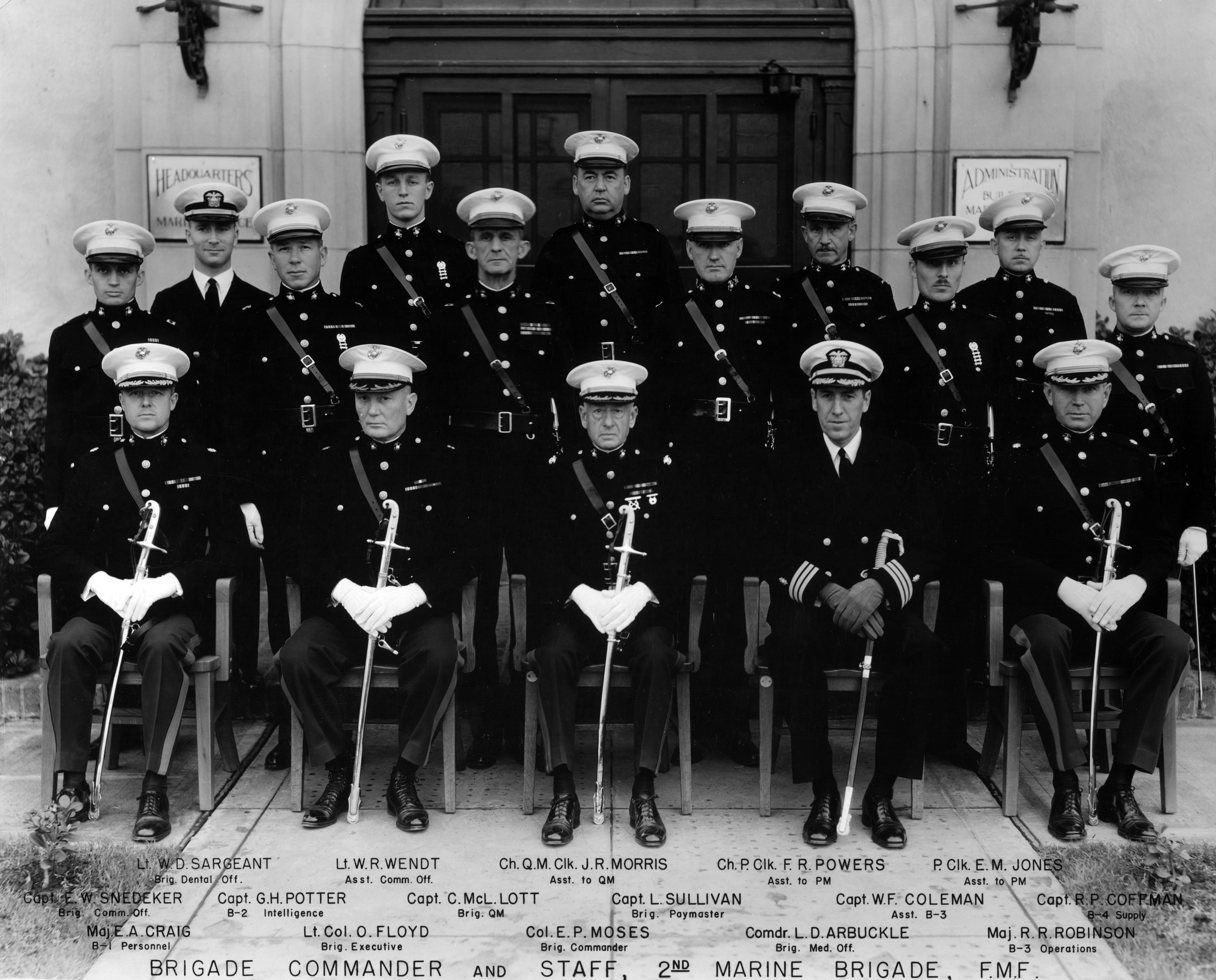
Colonel Moses with the staff of 2nd Marine Brigade in 1936.

He returned to Quantico in April 1927 and assumed command of 1st Battalion, 10th Marines. Following the activation of 3rd Marine Brigade under Brigadier General Smedley Butler at that time, Moses and his battalion joined the brigade and embarked for expeditionary duty in China. He was stationed at Shanghai International Settlement until September 7 of that year, when he was promoted to lieutenant colonel and attached to the American Legation Guard in Peking. While in the latter assignment, Moses served consecutively as executive officer, Officer-in-Charge of Operations and Training, and Post Intelligence Officer.

He departed China in June 1929 and entered the Army War College in Washington, D.C., where he graduated in June of the following year. Moses was then sent to the Senior Course at Naval War College at Newport, Rhode Island, which he completed in June 1931.

Moses then served at Marine Corps Base San Diego as commanding officer of the Recruit Depot and the Separate Infantry Battalion, before departed back to China for duty as executive officer, 4th Marine Regiment under Colonel Richard S. Hooker. He was stationed again at Shanghai International Settlement, where 4th Marines served as a defense force during a period of tensions between China and Japan. On December 23, 1932, Colonel Hooker suffered a heart attack and died following day. Moses assumed temporary command of the regiment and held it until arrival of new commanding officer, Colonel Fred D. Kilgore, on March 12, 1933.

Unfortunately, Colonel Kilgore was also betrayed by his health and following a nervous breakdown on May 6, 1933, he was succeeded by Moses as regimental commander. He held command of Fourth Marines until the arrival of Colonel John C. Beaumont on July 11 of that year.

Moses already proved his qualities during the periods of temporary regimental command and was promoted to colonel on March 20, 1934. He was then transferred to the Philippines and assumed command of the Marine Barracks and Naval Prison at Naval Base Cavite. Moses remained in that capacity until the end of August and embarked for the United States for deserved leave with his family. He reported for duty as commanding officer, Marine Barracks, Washington, D.C. at the beginning of October 1934 with additional duty as director, Marine Corps Institute.

He was appointed chief of staff, Fleet Marine Force under Brigadier General Douglas C. McDougal in September 1935 and assumed additional duty as commanding officer, 2nd Marine Brigade in July 1936. Moses later received a letter of commendation by general McDougal for his contributions to the Fleet Marine Force, especially for successful training of the 2d Marine Brigade. In June 1938, Moses was sent again to the Naval War College and graduated from the Advanced course one year later. Moses was promoted to brigadier general on February 1, 1939.

== World War II ==
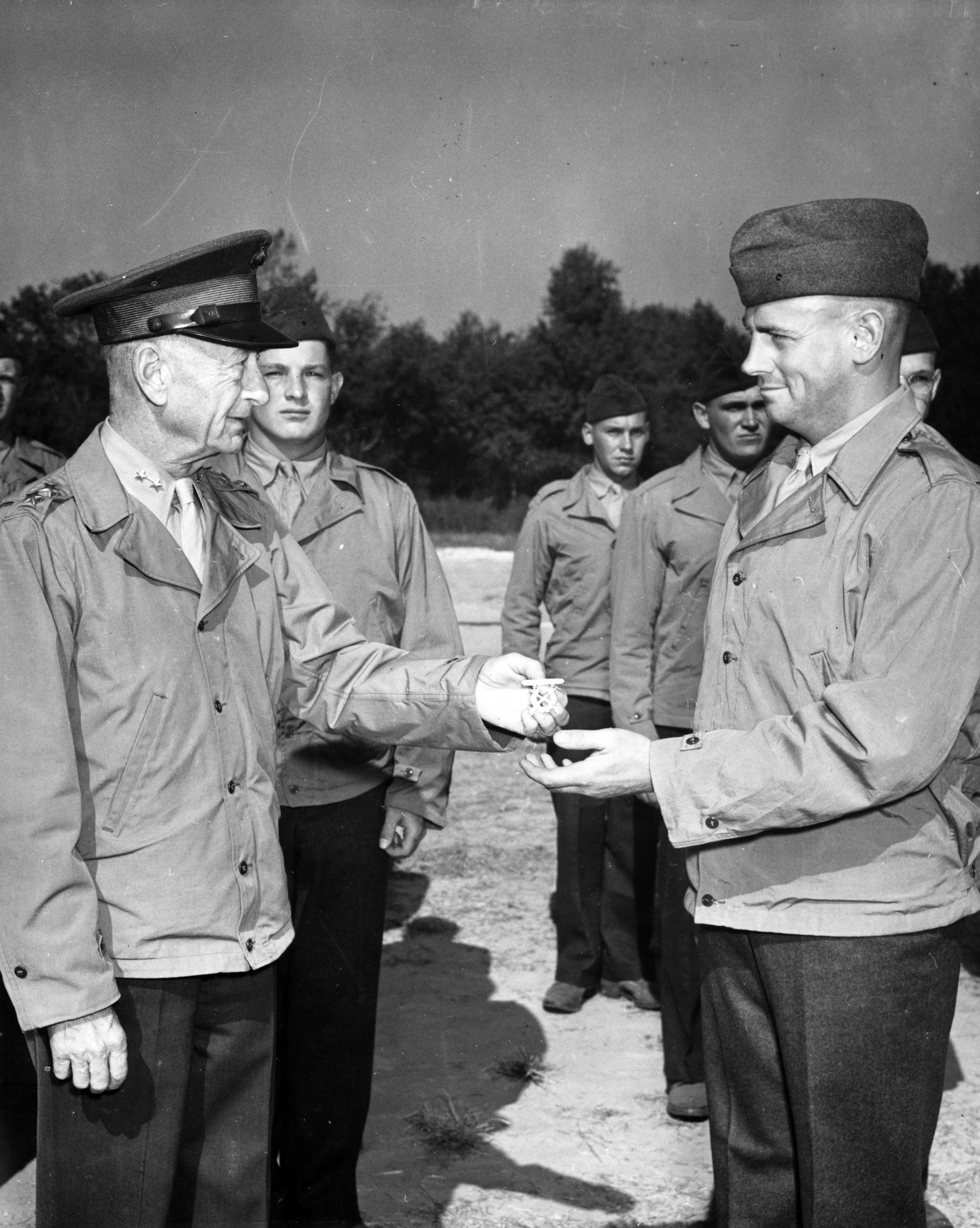
Major general Moses presenting Raymond W. Ickes with an expert rifleman badge at Parris Island in November 1943.

Upon the graduation from the Naval College in July 1939, Moses was appointed president, Marine Corps Equipment Board at Marine Corps Base Quantico, Virginia. Purpose of the board was to examine what was available from civilian industry that could be easily adapted to Marine Corps use, and to provide him with factual information on the efficiency and practicality of equipment being considered.

Marine Corps over the years had conducted its landing operations using standard ships' boats, which were too slow for amphibious assaults and were vulnerable to rough seas and surf. They could not carry heavy equipment like artillery weapons and other bulky items. However, due to insufficient funds in the Navy Department, no new landing crafts were bought.

In 1940, the Department of the Navy finally had sufficient funds to buy new landing crafts and Moses refreshed the idea of Roebling Alligator Amphibian Tractor. He made a visit to the Tractor plants in Clearwater, Florida, where he witnessed tests of new amphibian tractors. His visit would become a turning point in the development of the amphibian tractor in the Marine Corps.

Moses persuaded the owner of the factory and designer of Alligator, Donald Roebling, to design a stronger and more powerful version that would meet the needs of the Marine Corps. Following a period of tests and modifications, Moses recommended the Navy Department to buy Alligators and navy ordered one hundred Alligators in October 1940 and additional two hundred Alligators were ordered in February 1941. Alligators were subsequently renamed LVTs and began to form a specialized units to operate them.

On September 19, 1941, Moses was assigned to command the Marine Barracks, Parris Island, South Carolina. While in this capacity, Moses was promoted to major general on October 9, 1942. He hosted several important guests, including President Franklin D. Roosevelt, Secretary of the Navy Frank Knox or Commandant of the Marine Corps, Thomas Holcomb.

During his tenure as commanding general at Parris Island, approximately 170,000 recruits were trained between 1941 and 1944. These troops were subsequently used as reinforcements for combat units deployed in South Pacific, including 4th, 5th and 6th Marine Divisions. Moses requested several times a combat command assignment in the Far East area due to his previous experience, but his requests were turned down by Commandant Holcomb due to his age.

He retired from active duty on May 1, 1944, after 40 years of commissioned service. A large military review was held in honor of retiring general Moses. He was succeeded by another Marine veteran, Major General Clayton B. Vogel.

== Retirement and death ==
Upon his retirement from the Marine Corps, Moses settled in La Jolla, California, where he died on December 22, 1965. He was buried with full military honors at Arlington National Cemetery, Virginia. Moses was survived by his wife, Carolyn Angier (1891–1984), a son Emile P. Jr., who also served in the Marine Corps as lieutenant colonel and daughter Elizabeth "Betty" Angier, wife of Marine Brigadier General Charles L. Banks.

== Military awards ==
Here is the ribbon bar of Major General Moses:

| 1st Row | Marine Corps Expeditionary Medal with five 3/16" bronze stars | Nicaraguan Campaign Medal | Mexican Service Medal | World War I Victory Medal |
| 2nd Row | Yangtze Service Medal | American Defense Service Medal | American Campaign Medal | World War II Victory Medal |

== See also ==
- Marine Corps Recruit Depot Parris Island
- Landing Vehicle Tracked

Military offices
| Preceded by James C. Breckinridge | Commanding General, Marine Corps Recruit Depot Parris Island; September 19, 1941 - April 30, 1944 | Succeeded by Clayton B. Vogel |
