= Battle of Enogai =

Battle of the New Georgia campaign during World War II

- Part of the Pacific Theater of World War II
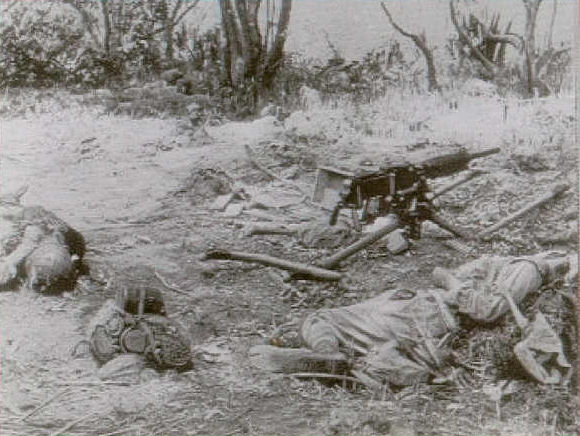
- A dead Japanese heavy machine-gun crew after the battle on 11 July 1943
Date	10–11 July 1943
Location	New Georgia, Solomon Islands
Result	American victory

Belligerents
United States	Japan

Commanders and leaders
(United States) Harry B. Liversedge	(Empire of Japan) Minoru Sasaki (Empire of Japan) Saburo Okumura

Strength
1 Marine battalion, 2 infantry battalions (overall); 4 Marine companies (final assault)	~ 400

Casualties and losses
47 – 51 killed	150 – 350 killed

The Battle of Enogai was a battle between United States and Imperial Japanese Army and Navy forces on 10–11 July 1943. It took place in the early phase of the New Georgia campaign in the Solomon Islands during the Pacific War. Prior to the battle, US troops had landed at Rice Anchorage, in the Kula Gulf, on the northern coast of New Georgia, tasked with supporting efforts further south to advance on the airfield at Munda.

After the landing, three battalions of United States Marines and United States Army soldiers had begun advancing inland to secure Bairoko Harbor. They marched through dense jungle towards an inlet around the small port of Enogai. A series of minor engagements took place before the main assault. A battalion of Marines attacked a force of around 400 Japanese, forcing the defending troops to withdraw after a firefight that lasted into the early afternoon. Mopping up operations continued into the following day, after which Enogai was used as a base prior to the attack on Bairoko later in the month.

== Background ==
=== Strategic situation ===
Following the completion of the Guadalcanal campaign in early 1943, the Allied high command began planning the next step in their effort to neutralize the main Japanese base at Rabaul as part of Operation Cartwheel. The advance north through the central Solomon Islands involved a series of operations to secure island bases for shipping and aircraft. Plans for 1943 conceived the capture of New Georgia and then later Bougainville by US troops. Elsewhere, in New Guinea, the Australians would capture Lae and Salamaua and secure Finschafen.

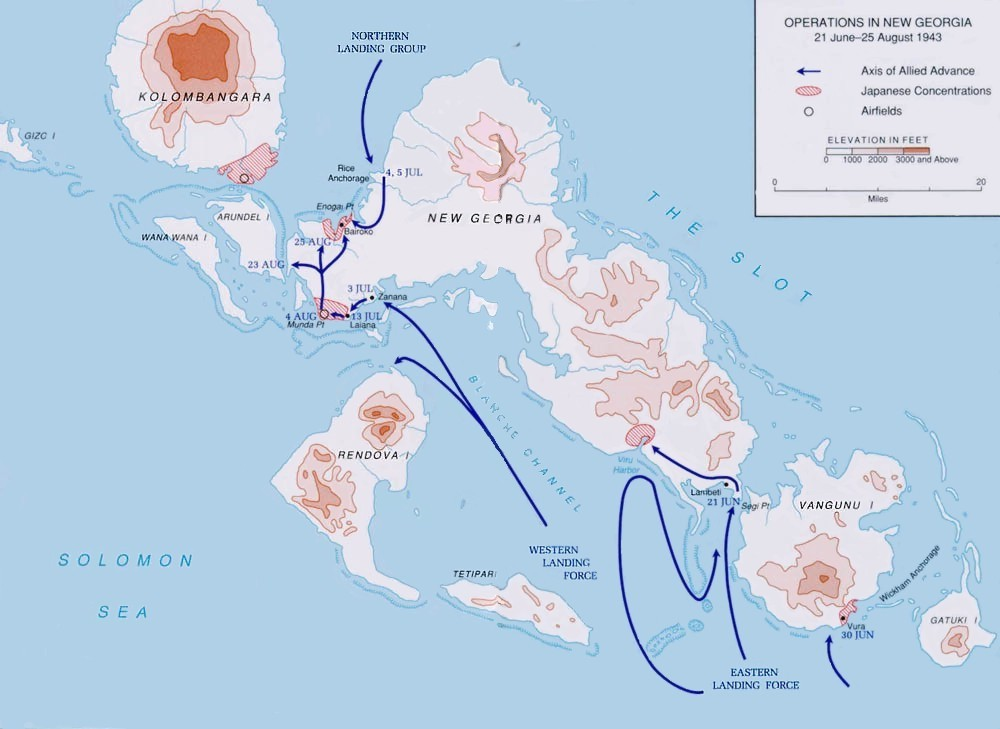
Allied landings in the New Georgias

The campaign to secure New Georgia, designated Operation Toenails by US planners, was focused upon securing the airfield at Munda Point, on the western coast of New Georgia island. As part of this effort, several initial landings were undertaken to capture staging areas at Wickham Anchorage and Viru Harbor and an airfield at Segi Point in the southern part of New Georgia, to support the movement of troops and supplies from Guadalcanal. These supplies would be staged through to Rendova, which would be built up as base for further operations in New Georgia focused on securing the airfield at Munda. These preliminary operations began at the end of June 1943.

After the initial landings, Rendova was secured quickly. On 2 July, troops from the US 169th and 172nd Infantry Regiments crossed the Blanche Channel to the western coast of New Georgia, landing around Zanana to begin the drive on Munda Point. To support this effort a separate landing group was detached to secure the area around Bairoko on the northern coast. The area was believed by Allied planners to lie on key Japanese lines of communication to support the troops holding the Munda area. Consequently, the Northern Landing Group was tasked with blocking the Munda–Bairoko trail and securing Bairoko Harbor, which provided the sea link with the Japanese base at Vila on Kolombangara to the northwest.

=== Opposing forces ===
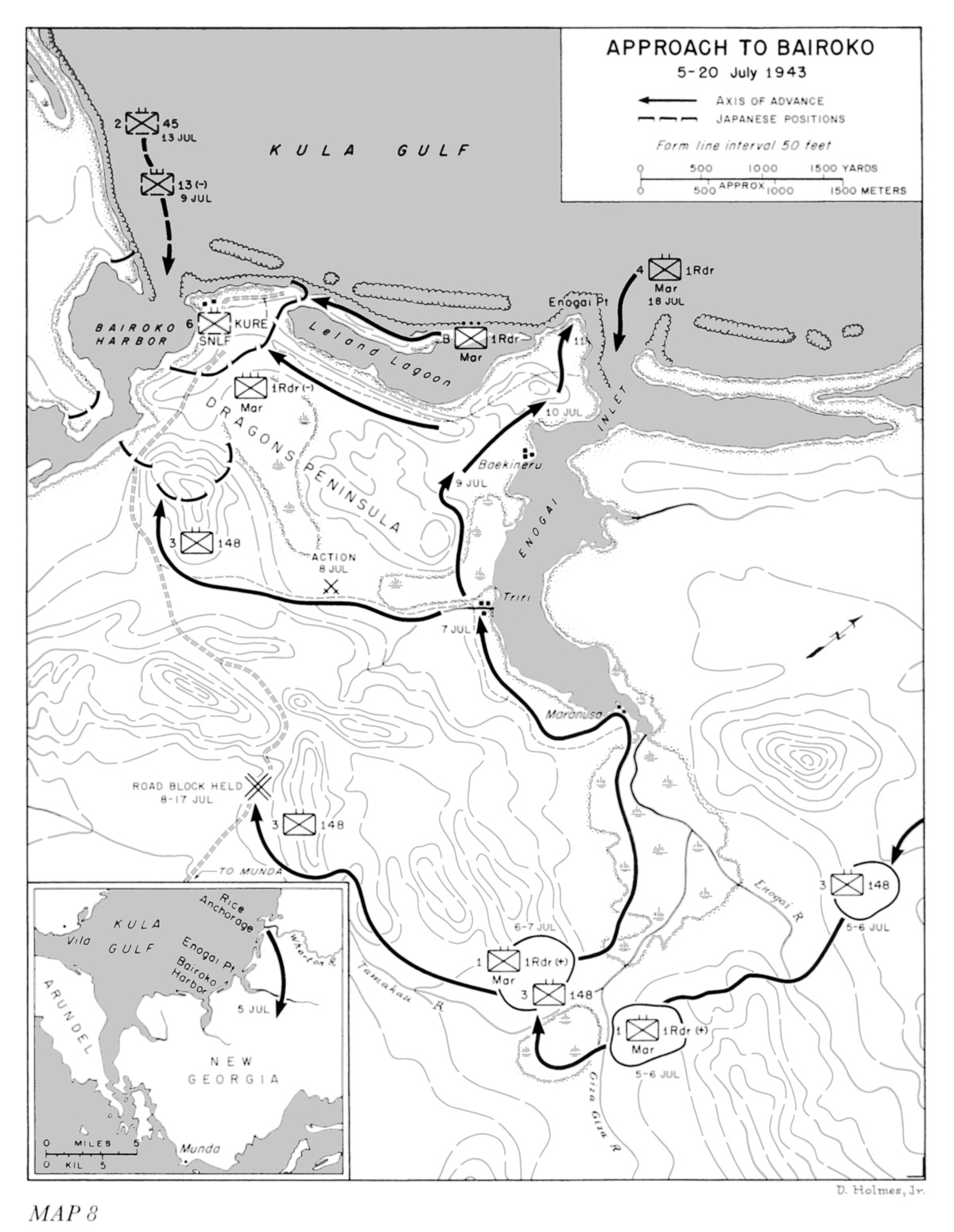
Approach to Bairoko, coordinated with move on Enogai

The task of landing around Bairoko was given to the Northern Landing Group, under the command of Colonel Harry B. Liversedge. This force consisted of one battalion of U.S. Marine Raiders from the 1st Marine Raider Regiment (the 1st Battalion), supported by two United States Army infantry battalions (the 3rd Battalion, 145th Infantry Regiment and the 3rd Battalion, 148th Infantry Regiment). This force was organized to facilitate quick movement through the jungle. No artillery was assigned to the force; instead fire support would be provided by mortars and machine guns. Additionally, only three days of rations were carried by the troops, as US commanders intended upon resupplying over the shore at the small port of Enogai on the Dragons Peninsula, after advancing from the landing beach around the Rice Anchorage.

Allied intelligence estimated that there was around 500 Japanese troops in the area; in reality there were 1,100 consisting of 300 Imperial Japanese Army soldiers and 800 Imperial Japanese Navy personnel. The main unit in the area was Commander Okumura Saburo's Kure 6th Special Naval Landing Force, guarding Enogai. Okumura's unit had departed Rabaul for New Georgia in late January 1943 and completed their landings around Enogai and Bairoko on February 1, 1943.

== Battle ==
=== Landings ===
Liversedge's force landed at the Rice Anchorage, about 600 yards (550 m) past the mouth of the Wharton River, in the Kula Gulf area early on 5 July, having sailed from aboard several high speed transports and minesweepers at Guadalcanal the previous day. The landing force was escorted by a naval group including nine destroyers and three cruisers that were assigned to be a covering force and a bombardment force. This force carried out a pre-assault bombardment of Kolombangara and Bairoko around midnight on 4/5 July. Prior to the landing, an Australian coastwatcher, Flight Officer John Corrigan, and US Marine Captain Clay Boyd had organized a local labor force to begin clearing the landing beach, as well as a bivouac site and trails from Kula Gulf towards Enogai; they later marked the landing site with canoes and beacons to aid the landing craft and rubber boats that brought the troops ashore. During preliminary operations, one of the covering destroyers, USS Strong, was fatally torpedoed by a Japanese destroyer group operating in the Kula Gulf.

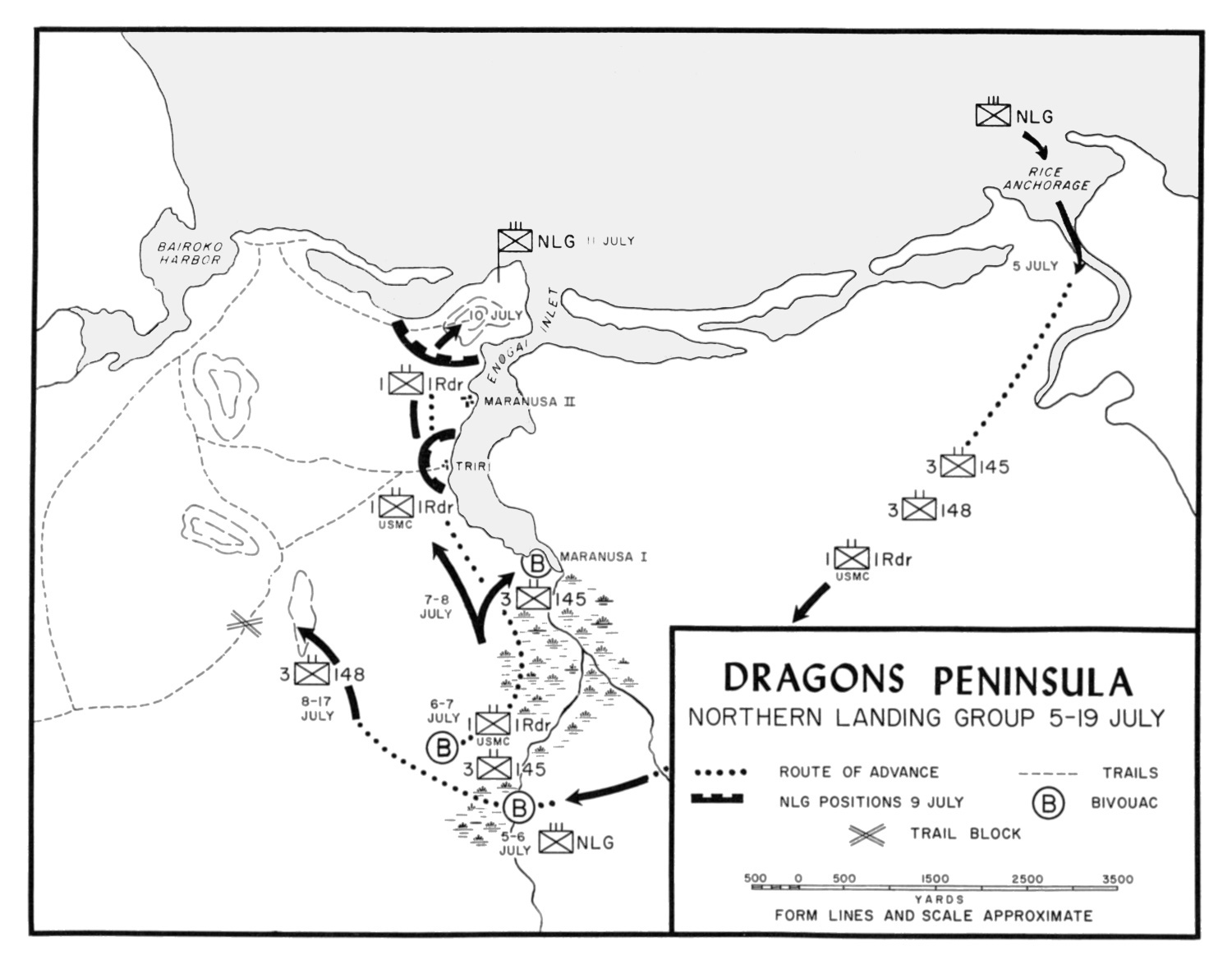
Map depicting the US force's advance on Enogai

Two shallow sandbars at the mouth of the river briefly held up the landing, but these were overcome by lightening the loads each vessel carried. The landing took place before dawn, and in the darkness about 200 troops from the 148th Infantry Regiment accidentally landed at Kobukobu Inlet instead. It would take several days for these troops to eventually rejoin Liversedge's force; meanwhile, the main landing proceeded largely unopposed, except for artillery fire from Japanese coastal batteries at Enogai. The threat of air attack meant that the unloading process was cut short as dawn approached, and the escort convoy withdrew with a small number of troops and some cargo—including an important high-powered radio—while Liversedge's troops quickly moved inland. After landing, the US troops established a beachhead and supply dump and set out towards Enogai and Bairoko Harbor. Their objective lay about 8 miles (13 km) on a direct route overland; instead, the US troops opted for a more circuitous route, traversing three parallel trails south towards the Giza Giza River.

=== March to Enogai ===
While two companies from the 145th Infantry Regiment held Rice Anchorage, the two other companies of the 145th were assigned as a force reserve as the three US battalions set out. Amidst a heavy downpour, they found the going difficult and were only able to advance 5 miles (8.0 km) through the dense jungle the first day. The trail cleared by Corrigan and Boyd's laborers only extended to the Giza Giza River, from where the advancing troops would have to clear their own path. While US aircraft attacked Japanese guns around Enogai, the advancing troops established a bridgehead on the opposite side of the river, where a defensive harbor was set up overnight. No engagements occurred during the advance on the first day. The advance continued the following day, but the crossing of the rain-swollen Tamakau River was slowed by flooding and the lack of bridging equipment. The crossing took place over a single log and was a 7-hour endeavor. The operation was completed by nightfall on 6 July, after which the Marines and soldiers established a bivouac for the night. Technical Seargent Edwarde Adoplhe recalled "The senior non-commisioned officers were carrying a small ration of brandy for emergencies" and "We considered that an emergency and it put us right to sleep".

The advance towards Enogai and the Munda–Bairoko trail began on 7 July, watched by a platoon of Japanese troops who maintained their distance. While the 148th was ordered to proceed south towards the Munda–Bairoko trail, the Marines and the two companies from 145th, turned northwest to advance on Enogai Inlet via a swamp. The rate of advance remained slow, held up by the terrain, but by the end of the day the Marines had reached the Enogai Inlet. Over the course three days, the advancing US troops had covered only 7 miles (11 km). The same day, a Marine platoon occupied Maranusa unopposed before advancing towards Triri. Short of the village, they clashed with the Japanese for the first time, killing two and forcing three others to withdraw. As the Marines brought up reinforcements to occupy the village and prepare for a Japanese counterattack, another skirmish took place when the Marine demolition platoon was attacked by a small Japanese force. In response, a Marine rifle company counterattacked, forcing the Japanese to withdraw. Ten Japanese were killed in the action, while three US Marines also died in this action. At this time, Liversedge requested further airstrikes against Enogai via radio, having largely maintained radio silence. Owing to the loss of the high powered radio, attempts to send the request via two medium-powered radios were initially unsuccessful before they were relayed by an Army unit in eastern New Georgia to Guadalcanal.

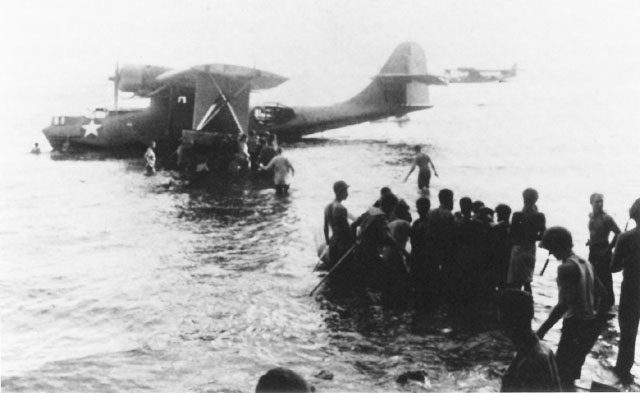
US casualties being evacuated by seaplane after the fighting around Enogai

Troops from the 148th Infantry Regiment occupied blocking positions along the Munda–Bairoko trail on 8 July, while Marines began patrolling operations from Triri, setting several ambushes on the trails towards Enogai and Bairoko. A patrol reported the way through to Enogai clear, and Liversedge began to concentrate the companies from the 1st Raiders to carry out an assault on the village. To achieve this, he sent the two companies of the 145th Infantry Regiment from Maranusa—where they were guarding the main US command post—to relieve Company C who had become entangled in a firefight after going to the aid of one of the patrols along the Bairoko trail. In the afternoon, the Marine battalion began its move towards Enogai. After stumbling into a swamp, the Marines were forced to return to Triri. Liversedge's troops were running short of food, and their wounded needed evacuation. He was unable to request assistance, though, after his radio was destroyed by a falling tree; as a result, he planned to make another effort to capture Enogai the following day.

Meanwhile, heavy fighting took place around the southern block, as 97 Japanese troops attacked the soldiers from the 148th Infantry Regiment along the trail, resulting in at least seven Japanese being killed as well as one US soldier. After 16:00 on 8 July, the Japanese commander, Okumura, launched an attack against Trii with 400 troops, falling on the troops from the westernmost company of the 145th Infantry Regiment that were holding the main US command post. This attack achieved some initial success, until a swift counterattack from a Marine platoon repulsed the attack, resulting in 20 Japanese being killed.

=== Assault on Enogai ===
On 9 July, US forces began their advance to the mouth of the inlet, moving along higher ground west of the swamp they had run into the day before. In the process, they bypassed several villages, including Maranusa II, Baekineru, and Baevurana, where the Japanese had established strong defensive positions. While the soldiers held blocking positions to the south along the trial and secured Triri, the Marines launched the main assault on Enogai, beginning their approach from 07:00 with three Raider companies and a fourth in reserve, supported by a heavy mortar bombardment and long range machine-gun preparatory fire prior to the attack. By 11:00, the advance had reached Leland Lagoon. Around 15:00, two Japanese machine guns opened up on the advancing Marines, prompting them to shake out with Companies A, B and C abreast and D in reserve. Attacking without indirect fire support, the Marines advanced as the Japanese reinforced Enogai. The fighting continued throughout the afternoon, with the Marines advancing cautiously over 1,800 yards (1,600 m) against stiff resistance, before the US commander decided to establish a night harbor. By this time only a small group of Japanese defenders remained, with US troops having been held up short of Enogai Point.

Throughout the night, Liversedge made plans for an aerial resupply as his troops consumed the last of their combat rations, while the wounded—around 28 men—were treated in makeshift hospitals by doctors and corpsmen. On 10 July several patrols were sent out before the US attack recommenced at 07:00. At this time, three companies from the 1st Marine Raider Regiment were again committed, with one in reserve, while 60 mm mortars and plunging fire from machine guns provided fire support. Met by desultory small arms and light machine gun fire, one company captured Baekineru, while another, reinforced from reserve elements, advanced towards the ocean around Enogai Point. Japanese defensive fire intensified. Captured machine guns were then turned against their previous operators as the defenders began to withdraw, while US mortarmen began firing on the Japanese line of retreat from the high ground overlooking the village. By mid-afternoon, the Marines had overcome the main Japanese defense, although they continued to experience harassing fire as they established defensive positions along the beach.

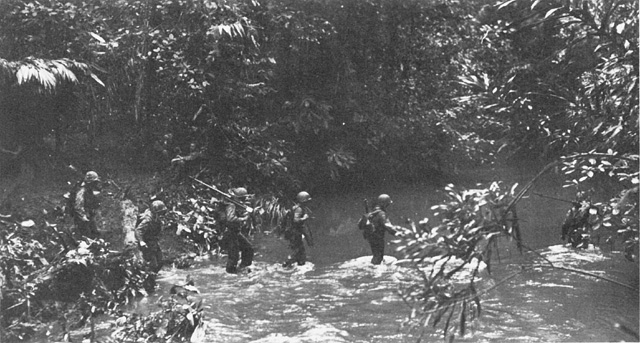
Marines patrolling around Enogai in August 1943

== Aftermath ==
US casualties amounted to 47 killed, 4 missing (presumed dead), and 74 wounded, while between 150 and 350 Japanese were estimated to have been killed. Four Japanese 140 mm coastal guns were captured, along with three antiaircraft guns and various other small arms and equipment. The Marines had been unable to carry full rations during the approach and consequently had to wait until 10 July for air dropped supplies to be brought forward to them from Triri; around 120 local laborers were used to carry rations forward to troops occupying the blocking positions, while elements of the 145th Infantry Regiment also carried out portage tasks, supporting the Marines around Enogai. Japanese air attacks on Enogai began on 11 July, killing three and wounding 15. They then became an almost daily occurrence. Casualties from the battle were evacuated by seaplane on 11 July; the process was interrupted when several Japanese fighters attacked the seaplanes on the water. Nevertheless, the damage was light, and the evacuation proceeded with the wounded being flown to Tulagi. While the bulk of the Japanese had withdrawn, US troops carried out mopping up operations throughout 11 July.

Following the capture of Enogai, Liversedge's force worked to improve the area's defenses, pressing several captured coastal guns into service, as well as other captured equipment including searchlights, machine guns, and mortars to secure the inlet. Elsewhere, to interdict Japanese reinforcements moving towards Munda, the roadblock that had been established about 2 miles (3.2 km) inland along the Munda–Bairoko trail, was held by US Army troops from 8 to 17 July until it was abandoned because of supply problems, increasing illness and tactical concerns. Meanwhile, the troops around Enogai undertook patrolling operations towards Bairoko Harbor, during which there were only a few minor skirmishes. On 20 July, Liversedge then carried out an unsuccessful follow-up attack on nearby Bairoko. After this, US forces remained in the Enogai area until the end of the New Georgia campaign, undertaking patrols and gathering intelligence regarding Japanese reinforcements moving towards the Munda area.
