= 1st Battalion, 10th Marines =

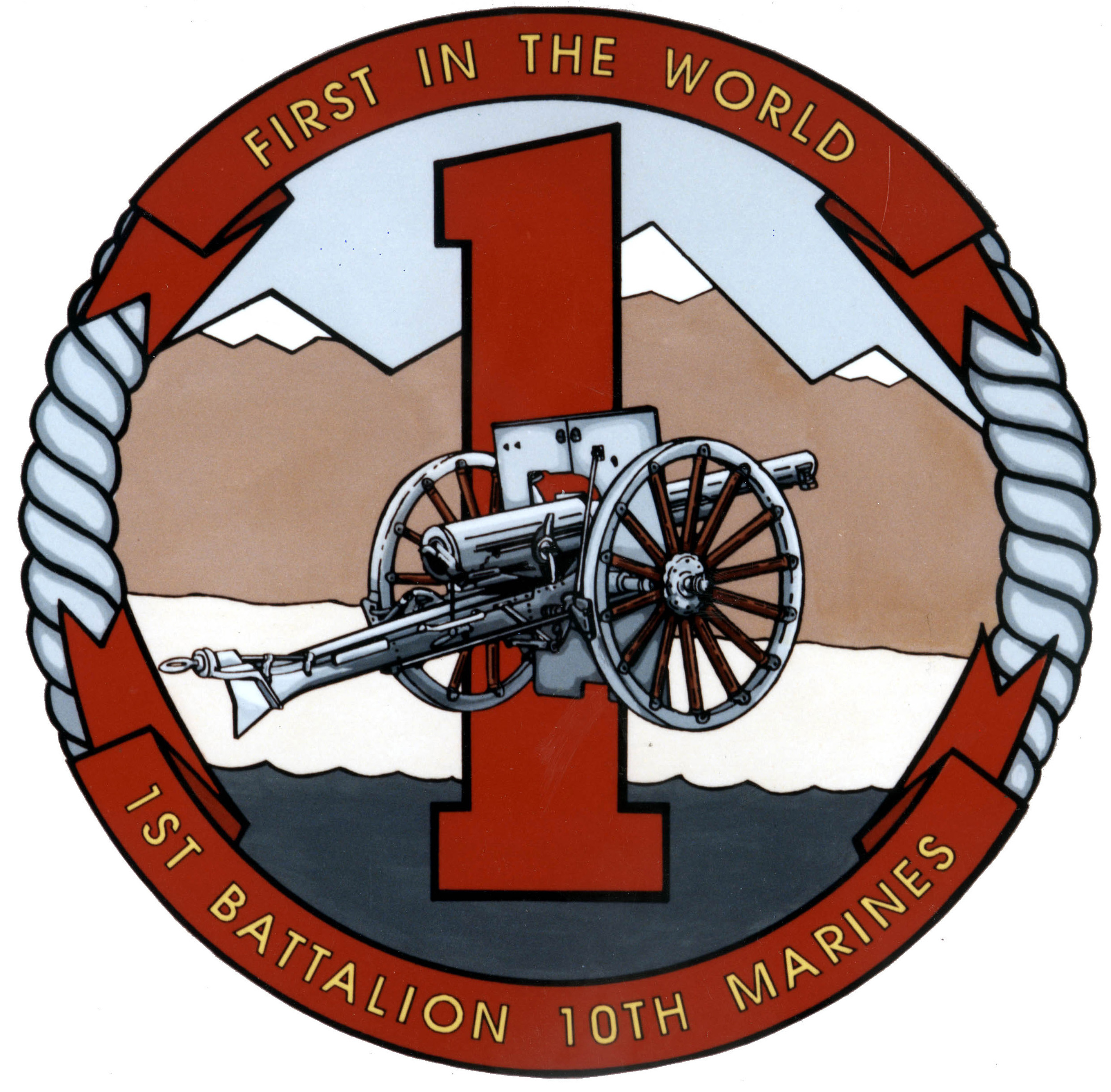
- 1/10 Insignia
- Active: November 1, 1940 – November 18, 1947; December 1, 1948 – present
- Country: United States of America
- Branch: United States Marine Corps
- Type: Artillery
- Role: Provide fire support to 2d Marine Division
- Part of: 10th Marine Regiment; 2d Marine Division
- Garrison/HQ: Marine Corps Base Camp Lejeune
- Nickname: Nightmare
- Motto: "First in the World"
- Engagements: World War II: Battle of Guadalcanal; Battle of Saipan; Battle of Tinian; Battle of Okinawa; Operation Desert Storm; Operation Iraqi Freedom: 2003 invasion of Iraq; Operation Enduring Freedom

Commanders
- Current commander: LtCol Joseph R. Mozzi
- Notable commanders: Emile P. Moses

1st Battalion, 10th Marines (1/10) is an artillery battalion composed of five firing batteries and a headquarters battery. The battalion is stationed at Camp Lejeune, North Carolina and falls under the command of 10th Marine Regiment, part of 2d Marine Division. Its primary weapon system is the Navy/Marine Expeditionary Ship Interdiction System (NMESIS) and the M777A2 155 mm lightweight howitzer.

== Mission ==
The unit's mission is to provide direct artillery support for 2d Marine Division in time of conflict. That support may come in traditional fashion, i.e. artillery support to maneuver forces, or by providing batteries to serve as provisional rifle companies.

== Current units ==
- Headquarters Battery
- Battery A (Alpha Battery)
- Battery B (Bravo Battery)
- Battery C (Charlie Battery)
- Battery D (Delta Battery) *(Formerly India Battery)
- Battery R (Romeo Battery)

== History ==
=== World War II ===
The unit was activated on November 1, 1940, at San Diego, California, as 1st Battalion, 10th Marines (1/10) and was assigned to the 2d Marine Brigade, Fleet Marine Force. The 2d Marine Brigade was renamed the 2d Marine Division on February 1, 1941.

During January 1942, 1/10 was deployed to American Samoa and detached from the 2d Marine Division. In November 1942, the unit was redeployed to Guadalcanal and attached to 11th Marines, 1st Marine Division, Fleet Marine Force. In December 1942, the unit was reassigned to 9th Marines.

1st Battalion, 10th Marines participated in the following World War II campaigns:

- Guadalcanal
- Battle of Tarawa
- Battle of Saipan
- Battle of Tinian
- Battle of Okinawa

and subsequently in the occupation of Japan from September 1945 to June 1946.

During July 1946, 1/10 was relocated to MCB Camp Lejeune; then deactivated on November 18, 1947.

The unit was then reactivated to Camp Lejeune as 1st Battalion, 10th Marines on December 1, 1948.

=== 1960s–1980s ===
1/10 deployed to Cuba in response to the missile crisis from October to December 1962.

In the late 1970s and early 1980s, the battalion was deployed to Europe for participation in North Atlantic Treaty Organization (NATO) exercises.

During the 1980s, the battalion became a cold-weather-trained unit, conducting training at Fort Drum, New York and above the Arctic Circle. The battalion also transitioned to the 155 mm howitzer during this period. They regularly supported training operations at the Marine Corps Air Ground Combat Center at 29 Palms, California.

Charlie Battery was deployed to Beirut, Lebanon, in 1983 as a part of Battalion Landing Team 1/8. On 23 October, the battery lost eight Marines in the Beirut Barracks attack. While deployed to Beirut, Charlie Battery was the first U.S. artillery unit to fire the M198 155 mm howitzer in combat.

=== 1990s ===
First Battalion participated in Operations Desert Shield and Desert Storm in Southwest Asia from January 1991 to February 1991.

A Detachment from Bravo Battery aboard the USS IWO JIMA (LPH 2) during MARG 2–92 participated in Operation Provide Promise from July to November 1992.

From August to October 1994, an element of 1/10 participated in Operations Support Democracy and Uphold Democracy in Haiti.

=== Global War on Terror ===
In February 2003, 1/10 deployed to Kuwait, it then participated in Operation Iraqi Freedom, in Iraq in March 2003. During the invasion the unit took part in the Battle of Nasiriyah.

Then again Battery B deployed to Iraq in June 2004 to February 2005 performed split-battery operations from the cities Muhumadyia and Iskandariyah providing fire support for the 24th Marine Expeditionary Unit (MEU).

From February-September 2005 Alpha Battery deployed to Fallujah in support of operation Iraqi Freedom II.

Between September 2007 and April 2008, 1/10 was deployed to Iraq and was stationed throughout the Al Anbar province as TFMP (Task Force Military Police).

From November 2010 to May 2011, 1/10 deployed in support of Operation Enduring Freedom, in Helmand Province, Afghanistan.

From August 2021 to December 2021, 1/10 (-/+) supported Operation Allies Refuge/Allies Welcome as part of Task Force Quantico.

=== Force Design Redesignation and Reorganization ===
In October 2026, 1/10 was redesignated and reorganized as a Medium-Ranged Missile (MMSL) Battalion as part of Marine Corps Force Design. The unit's principal weapon system will be the Navy/Marine Expeditionary Ship Interdiction System (NMESIS).

== See also ==
- Organization of the United States Marine Corps
- List of United States Marine Corps battalions
