= USS Waters =

Ship name

USS Waters may refer to the following ships operated by the United States Navy:

- USS Waters (DD-115), was a Wickes-class destroyer launched in 1918 and sold for scrap in 1946.
- USNS Waters (T-AGS-45), an oceanographic survey ship launched in 1992; converted to support submarine navigation system testing in 1998; and is currently in service.
