= James Hooker Strong =

US Navy admiral (1814-1882)

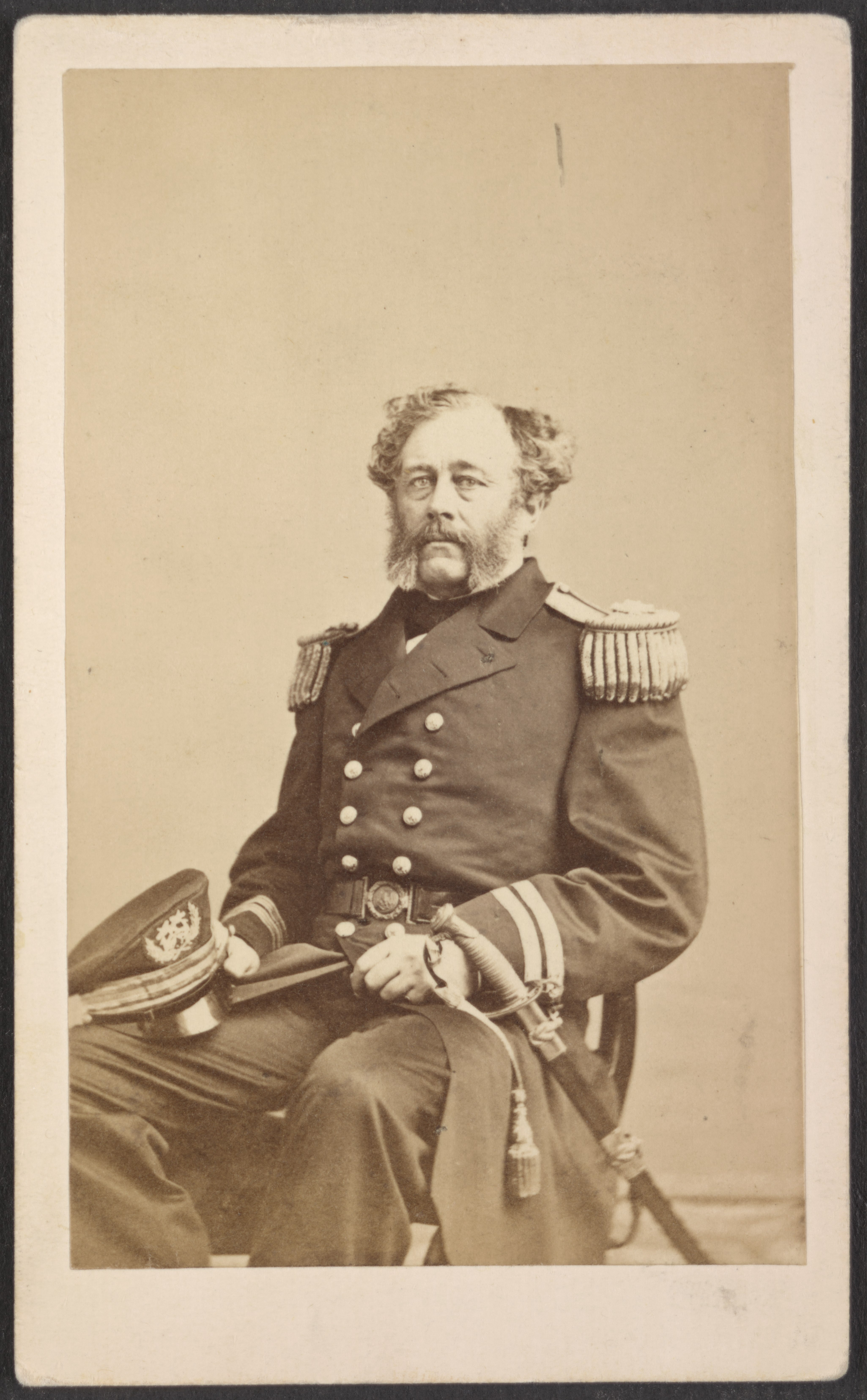
- Born: April 26, 1814; Canandaigua, New York
- Died: November 28, 1882 (aged 68); Columbia, South Carolina
- Burial place: Commander James H. Strong of U.S.S. Mohawk, Flag, and Monongahela in uniform with sword. From the Liljenquist Family Collection of Civil War Photographs, Prints and Photographs Division, Library of Congress
- Military career
- Allegiance: United States
- Branch: United States Navy
- Service years: 1829–1876
- Rank: Rear admiral
- Commands: Relief; Mohawk; Flag; Monongahela; Canandaigua; South Atlantic Squadron
- Conflicts: American Civil War

James Hooker Strong (26 April 1814 – 28 November 1882) was a rear admiral of the United States Navy, who served during the American Civil War.

== Biography ==
Strong, born in Canandaigua, New York, was appointed a midshipman in the Navy while he was a student in the Polytechnic College at Chittenango, New York, on 2 February 1829. He made his first cruise on the Brazil Station in Lexington from 1833 to 1835. After various cruises, he commanded the store ship Relief in 1859.

On the outbreak of the Civil War in April 1861, Strong was promoted to commander, and commanded Mohawk and Flag in the South Atlantic Blockading Squadron in 1861 and 1862, and Monongahela in the West Gulf Blockading Squadron from 1863 to 1865. At the Battle of Mobile Bay, he was the first to ram the Confederate ironclad CSS Tennessee and received high commendation for his initiative and valor, and a promotion to captain.

Strong served at the Brooklyn Navy Yard in 1866 and 1867, and later commanded Canandaigua in the Mediterranean Squadron in 1869 and 1870. He was promoted to rear admiral in 1873 and served as Commander-in-Chief of the South Atlantic Squadron from 1873 to 1875.

Strong retired on 25 April 1876. He died in Columbia, South Carolina, on 28 November 1882.

== Dates of rank ==
- Midshipman, 2 February 1829.
- Passed Midshipman, 4 June 1836.
- Lieutenant, 8 September 1841.
- Commander, 24 April 1861.
- Captain, 5 August 1865.
- Commodore, 2 March 1870.
- Rear Admiral, 25 September 1873.
- Retired List, 25 April 1876.

== Namesakes ==
Two destroyers have been named USS Strong in his honor.
