= Bairoko Harbor =

Coordinates: 8°12′S 157°16′E

Bairoko Harbor is situated along the northwestern shore of the island of New Georgia in the Solomon Islands.

== History ==
During World War II Japan used Bairoko Harbor to resupply its forces at Munda Point, an airstrip situated along the south coast of New Georgia. Allied forces deemed Munda critical for control of this section of the Solomon Islands and necessary for the continued progress northward toward Japan.

After capturing Enogai, a village situated a few miles east of Bairoko Harbor, the Northern Landing Group of United States Marines comprising the 1st and 4th Marine Raider Battalions assaulted the harbor on June 20, 1943. Greatly outmanned, the lightly armed Marines failed to overcome the deeply entrenched, heavily armed Japanese defenders in the resulting Battle of Bairoko and were turned back after losses in dense jungle fighting.

The loss marked the first time the Marine Raiders had failed to take an objective, and was blamed in part on failure of the United States Army Air Corps to provide air support for the operation as requested. The battle caused the Joint Chiefs to rethink the strategy of pitting lightly armed forces against well-fortified enemy forces, and the operation planners drew the criticism of the Joint Chiefs for having marginalized the entire operation "as if it had been a sideshow".

Unable to prevent the loss of Munda to the Allies due to assaults on the airstrip by other forces, the Japanese evacuated the entire island of New Georgia via Bairoko Harbor within a month of the initial attack. From New Georgia the Allies continued "up the slot" toward Japan, fighting next at Bougainville.
