= List of people with surname Jones =

Jones is a surname common in the English-speaking world. This list provides links to biographies of people who share this common surname. Unhyphenated double-barrelled names where the second part is Jones are included. Hyphenated names where the first part is Jones are included; those where the second part is Jones, such as Burne-Jones, are not.

== Arts and entertainment ==
=== Architecture ===
- Inigo Jones (1573–1652), English architect of Welsh descent

=== Acting ===
- Angus T. Jones (born 1993), American actor
- Carolyn Jones (1930–1983), American actress
- Catherine Zeta-Jones (born 1969), Welsh actress
- Cissy Jones (born 1979), American actress
- Cherry Jones (born 1956), American actress
- Chloe Jones (1975–2005), American porn actress
- Claude Earl Jones (1933–2019), American actor, known for Miracle Mile
- Darby Jones (1910–1986), American actor
- Duane Jones (1937–1988), American actor and theatre director
- Elise Marilyn Jones (stage name Chloe Cherry, born 1997), American actress and model
- Emilia Jones (born 2002), English actress
- Felicity Jones (born 1983), English actress
- Finn Jones (born 1988), English actor
- Gemma Jones (born 1942), English actress
- James Earl Jones (1931–2024), American actor
- January Jones (born 1978), American actress
- Julian Lewis Jones (born 1968), Welsh actor
- L. Q. Jones (1927–2022), American actor and director
- Mei Jones (1953–2021), Welsh actor and writer
- Orlando Jones (born 1968), American comedian and actor
- Rashida Jones (born 1976), American actress
- Renée Jones (born 1958), American actress
- Ronalda Jones, Canadian actress and writer
- Scarlett Jones (born 1996), British pornographic actress
- Suranne Jones (born 1978), English actress
- Tamala Jones (born 1974), American actress
- Toby Jones (born 1966), English actor
- Tyler Patrick Jones (born 1994), American actor
- Vernon Jones (born 1969), American actor who has been missing since 1993

=== Dance ===
- Anthony Jones (1962–2020), Jamaican dancehall deejay
- Lana Jones, Australian ballet dancer
- Ludie Jones (1916–2018), American tap dancer
- Muriel Jones (1890–1974), South African dancer and philanthropist

=== Fashion ===
- Grace Jones (born 1948), Jamaican-American model, actress, and singer

=== Music ===
- Anton Jones (1937–2016), Sri Lankan Burgher bayila musician
- Arden Jones (born 2001), Californian rapper
- Ayron Jones (born 1986), American guitarist, singer and songwriter
- Camille Jones (born 1973), Danish singer-songwriter
- Caryl Parry Jones (born 1958), Welsh singer-songwriter and radio presenter
- Della Jones (born 1946), Welsh operatic mezzo-soprano
- Donell Jones (born 1973), American R&B singer-songwriter-producer
- Donovan Jones, bassist of the band This Will Destroy You
- Dora Herbert Jones (1890–1974), Welsh administrator and singer
- Elvin Jones (1927–2014), American drummer for John Coltrane
- Etta Jones (1928–2001), American jazz singer
- Golden jones (born 2000) American pop rap artist aka 24kGoldn
- Gloria Jones (born 1945), American singer and songwriter
- Grace Jones (born 1948), Jamaican singer, songwriter, record producer, actress and model
- Howard Jones (born 1955), British musician
- Howard Jones (born 1970), American metalcore vocalist
- Jones (singer), British singer-songwriter, also known by her stage name JONES
- Linda Jones (1944–1972), American soul singer
- Lucie Jones (born 1991), Welsh singer
- Nas (born Nasir Jones in 1973), American rapper
- Norah Jones (born 1979), American musician
- Rickie Lee Jones (born 1954), American singer, musician, and songwriter
- Sharon Jones (1956–2016), American soul/funk singer
- Spike Jones (1911–1965), born Lindley Armstrong Jones, American musician
- Tammy Jones (born 1944), Welsh singer
- Thad Jones (1923–1986), African-American jazz trumpeter, composer, and bandleader
- Tutu Jones (born 1966), American blues guitarist, singer and songwriter

=== Television and film ===
- Debi Jones (born 1958), English broadcaster and politician
- Demi Jones (born 1998), English television personality
- Doreen Jones (1940–2017), British casting director
- Duncan Jones (born 1971), British film director, producer and screenwriter; son of the musician David Bowie
- Gethin Jones (born 1978), Welsh television presenter
- Star Jones (born 1962), American lawyer, journalist, television personality, fashion designer, author, and women's and diversity advocate

=== Visual artists ===
- Aneurin Jones (1930–2017), Welsh painter
- Cambridge Jones, British photographer
- Ezzelina Jones (1921–2012), Welsh artist and sculptor
- Lucy Jones (born 1955), British artist
- Nneka Jones, Trinidadian artist
- Theodora Varnay Jones (born 1942), Hungarian-born American artist
- Wayson R. Jones, American painter
- Wynne Melville Jones (born 1947), Welsh artist

== Education ==
- A. H. M. Jones (1904–1970), British classical scholar
- Valena C. Jones (1872–1917), American educator

== Law and politics ==
=== Law ===
- Clarence B. Jones (1931–2026), American lawyer and advisor to Martin Luther King
- Robley D. Jones (1860–1917), American politician and judge

=== American politics ===
- Addison P. Jones (1822–1910), New York state senator
- Anson Jones (1798–1858), the last president of the Republic of Texas
- Brereton C. Jones (1939–2023), Democratic Governor of Kentucky from 1991 to 1995
- Cadwallader Jones Jr. (1813–1899), American politician
- Cynthia Starke-Jones, American politician
- Frances Holk-Jones, member of the Alabama House of Representatives
- Denny Jones (1920–2012), American politician
- Jewell Jones (born 1995), American politician
- Kizziah J. Bills (1860–1924), maiden name Kizziah Jones, Black American suffragist, correspondent and columnist for Black press in Chicago, civil rights activist
- LaDawn Jones (born 1980), American politician and lawyer
- Moze Hunt Jones (1883–1914), member of the Mississippi House of Representatives
- Paula Jones (born 1966), former Arkansas state employee who sued President Bill Clinton for sexual harassment
- Renea Jones (born 1966), American politician
- Stiles P. Jones (1822–1861), Minnesota state senator and lawyer
- Tishaura Jones (born 1972), Mayor of St. Louis
- Van Jones (born 1968), Green Jobs Advisor to the Obama administration

=== United Kingdom politics ===
- Claudia Jones (1915–1964), Trinidad-born journalist and activist
- Elin Jones (born 1966), Welsh Plaid Cymru politician
- Ieuan Wyn Jones (born 1949), leader of Plaid Cymru, Deputy First Minister in the Welsh Assembly Government
- Jackie Jones (born 1966), Welsh Labour politician
- Kevan Jones (born 1964), British Labour politician, Privy Councillor and trade union official
- Leif Jones (1862–1939) Welsh Liberal Party politician and Privy Councillor
- Theobald Jones (1790–1868), also known as Toby Jones, Irish officer in the Royal Navy, MP for County Londonderry, and lichenologist
- Towyn Jones (1858–1925), Welsh Liberal politician
- Violet Key Jones (1883–1958), Anglo-Irish writer and suffragette

=== Other politics ===
- Yvonne Jones (born 1968), Canadian MP for Labrador (2013–present)

== Literature ==
=== Writers ===
- Cleolinda Jones (born 1978), American writer and blogger
- Constance Jones (1848–1922), English educator and writer on logic and ethics
- Ebenezer Jones (1820–1860), English poet
- Feminista Jones (born 1979), American writer and activist
- Gail Jones (writer) (born 1955), Australian novelist and academic
- Gayl Jones (born 1949), African-American poet and novelist
- J. V. Jones (born 1963), British fantasy author
- Lara Jones (1975–2010), British children's author
- Mal Lewis Jones, British children's author
- Pamela Jones, computer law scholar, founder and editor of Groklaw
- Penn Jones Jr., American journalist and author
- Rhiannon Davies Jones (1921–2014), Welsh historical novelist
- Rochelle Jones (1945–2006), South Florida author and journalist

== Military ==
- Arnold Elzey, born Arnold Elzey Jones (1816–1871), Confederate general during the American Civil War
- Arthur G. Jones-Williams (1898–1929), Welsh flying ace
- Don A. Jones (1912–2000), American admiral and civil engineer, seventh Director of the United States Coast and Geodetic Survey and second Director of the Environmental Science Services Administration Corps
- E. H. Jones (author) (1883–1942), British prisoner of war
- Ernest Lester Jones (1876–1929), American colonel, last Superintendent (1915–1919) and first Director (1919–1929) of the United States Coast and Geodetic Survey
- George L. Jones (1918–1997), Korean War flying ace
- H. Jones (1940–1982), British posthumous recipient of the Victoria Cross
- Hilary P. Jones (1863–1938), American naval officer
- Inigo Jones (British Army officer) (1848–1914), British major-general
- Jacob Jones (1768–1850), American naval officer
- James L. Jones (born 1943), United States Marine Corps officer
- John Jones (RAF airman), British flying ace
- John Jones Maesygarnedd (c. 1597–1660), English Civil War Parliamentary military officer executed for regicide
- John Paul Jones (1747–1792), American naval captain
- Marlboro Jones, American slave and Confederate body servant during the Civil War
- Michael Jones (soldier) (c. 1606–1649), Irish Confederate War and English Civil War Parliamentary military officer
- Patrick Henry Jones (1830–1900), Union brigadier general
- Philip Jones of Fonmon (1618–1674), English Civil War Parliamentary military officer and comptroller of Oliver Cromwell's household
- Philip Jones (Royal Navy officer) (born 1960), Royal Navy officer
- Victor Jones (British Army officer) (1898–?), British Army officer

== Mathematics and science ==
=== Astronomy ===
- Rhian Jones (born 1960), British planetary scientist

=== Archeology ===
- Vendyl Jones (1930–2010), American scholar

=== Biology ===
- Chonnettia Jones, American geneticist and developmental biologist
- Monty Jones (1951–2024), Sierra Leonean biologist and plant breeder

=== Computer science ===
- Karen Spärck Jones (1935–2007), British computer scientist (surname is double-barrelled: Spärck Jones)

=== Engineering ===
- Anya Jones, American aerospace engineer

=== Mathematics ===
- Burton Wadsworth Jones (1902–1983), American mathematician
- F. Burton Jones (1910–1999), American mathematician
- Vaughan Jones (1952–2020), New Zealand mathematician

=== Medicine ===
- Mabel Jones (c. 1865–1923), British physician and suffragette sympathizer

== Religion ==
- Serene Jones (born 1959), American academic

== Sports ==
=== Association football ===
- Cobi Jones (born 1970), American soccer player
- Curtis Jones (footballer, born 2001), English professional footballer
- Emlyn Jones, Welsh footballer
- Jermaine Jones (born 1981), American footballer
- Jodi Jones (footballer) (born 1997), English professional footballer
- Kenwyne Jones (born 1984), Trinidad and Tobago footballer
- Linden Jones (born 1961), Welsh footballer
- Miguel Jones (1938–2020), Spanish footballer
- Nico Jones (born 2002), English footballer

=== American football ===
- Arrington Jones (born 1959), running back
- Benito Jones (born 1997), defensive tackle
- Braxton Jones (born 1999), offensive tackle
- Broderick Jones (born 2001), offensive tackle
- Butch Jones (born 1968), head coach
- Cam Jones (born 1999), linebacker
- Cardale Jones (born 1992), quarterback
- Chandler Jones (born 1990), linebacker
- Daronte Jones (born 1978), coach
- Dawand Jones (born 2001), offensive tackle
- Deacon Jones (1938–2013), defensive end
- Deion Jones (born 1994), linebacker
- Dom Jones (born 2000), cornerback
- Dominic Jones (born 1987), defensive back
- Dre'Mont Jones (born 1997), defensive end
- Emery Jones Jr. (born 2004), offensive tackle
- Emory Jones (born 2000), quarterback
- Jamarco Jones (born 1996), offensive tackle
- Jamir Jones (born 1998), linebacker
- Jarrian Jones (born 2001), cornerback
- Jarvis Jones (born 1989), linebacker
- J. J. Jones (wide receiver) (born 1992), wide receiver
- Julio Jones (born 1989), wide receiver
- Keandre Jones (born 1997), linebacker
- Kobe Jones (born 1998), linebacker
- Korey Jones (born 1989), linebacker
- LaKendrick Jones (born 1979), lineman
- Lyndell Jones (born 1959), cornerback
- Manny Jones (born 1999), defensive tackle
- Marco Jones (born 2006), defensive end
- Mikel Jones (born 2000), linebacker
- Naquan Jones (born 1999), defensive tackle
- Nash Jones (born 2002), offensive guard
- Nazair Jones (born 1994), defensive tackle
- Qualan Jones (born 2000), running back
- Rohan Jones (born 2001), Canadian tight end
- Sai'vion Jones (born 2003), defensive end
- Seantavius Jones (born 1992), wide receiver
- Terren Jones (born 1991), offensive tackle
- Tevin Jones (born 1992), wide receiver
- Tramell Jones Jr. (born 2006), quarterback
- Vi Jones (born 1998), linebacker
- Velus Jones Jr. (born 1997), wide receiver
- Xavier Jones (born 1997), running back

=== Baseball ===
- Andruw Jones (born 1977), Curaçaoan outfielder
- Chipper Jones (born 1972), American 3rd baseman
- Fielder Jones (1871–1934), American baseball player and manager
- Garrett Jones (born 1981) American Major League outfielder and first baseman
- Jacque Jones (born 1975), American outfielder
- Jahmai Jones (born 1997), American outfielder
- Jared Jones (born 2001), American pitcher
- Jones (left fielder), unidentified baseball player for the Washington Nationals in 1884
- Jones (third baseman), unidentified baseball player for the New York Metropolitans in 1885
- Nolan Jones (born 1998), American baseball player
- Ruppert Jones (born 1955), American outfielder
- Sheldon Jones (1922–1991), American baseball player
- Taylor Jones (born 1993), American baseball player
- Tracy Jones (born 1961), former outfielder and current co-host on WLW radio in Cincinnati

=== Basketball ===
- Alexis Jones (born 1994), American basketball player
- Ava Jones (born 2005), American former basketball player
- Brionna Jones (born 1997), Puerto Rican basketball player
- Dahntay Jones (born 1980), American small forward/shooting guard
- Denver Jones (born 2000), American shooting guard in the Israeli Basketball Premier League
- DeVante' Jones (born 1998), American basketball player
- Dillon Jones (born 2001), American small forward
- Domonic Jones (born 1981), American point guard/shooting guard
- Haley Jones (born 2001), American guard
- Jalen Jones (born 1993), American basketball player in the Israeli Basketball Premier League
- Jarrod Jones (born 1990), American-Hungarian basketball player in the Israeli Basketball Premier League
- Kam Jones (born 2002), American guard
- K. C. Jones (1932–2020), American basketball player and coach
- L. Tucker Jones (born Leigh Tucker Jones, 1888–1943), American college basketball coach
- Lazeric Jones (born 1990), American point guard
- Merlaika Jones (born 1973), American former basketball player
- Sacha Killeya-Jones (born 1998), American-British basketball player for Hapoel Gilboa Galil of the Israeli Basketball Premier League
- Shelton Jones (born 1966), American basketball player
- Terrence Jones (born 1992), American power forward
- Tre Jones (born 2000), American point guard
- Tyrique Jones (born 1997), American basketball player in the Israeli Basketball Premier League

=== Boxing ===
- Ebonie Jones (born 1998), English professional boxer
- Roy Jones Jr. (born 1969), American boxing champion
- Troy Jones (born 1998), English professional boxer

=== Chess ===
- Gawain Jones (born 1987), English chess player

=== Cricket ===
- Geraint Jones (born 1976), England and Papua New Guinea player
- Steffan Jones (born 1974), Welsh cricketer
- Jones (Essex cricketer) (fl. 1787)
- Jones (Godalming cricketer) (fl. 1820s), English player for Surrey
- Jones (Sussex cricketer) (fl. 1832–1833)

=== Motor racing ===
- Conner Jones (born 2006), American NASCAR driver
- Erik Jones (born 1996), American NASCAR driver
- P. J. Jones (born 1969), American professional racing driver

=== Rugby league ===
- Stacey Jones (born 1976), New Zealand rugby league footballer

=== Rugby union ===
- Adam Jones (born 1982), Wales and British Lions rugby international
- Alun Wyn Jones (born 1985), Wales and British Lions rugby international. Current most capped rugby player worldwide at 170.
- Duncan Jones (born 1978), Wales rugby union player
- Elvet Jones (1912–1989), Wales and British Lions rugby international
- Huw Jones (born 1993), Scotland rugby union player
- Ken Jones (1921–2006), Wales rugby international, sprinter and OBE recipient. Roll of Honour in the Welsh Sports Hall of Fame
- Lewis Jones (1931–2024), Wales and British Lions rugby international. Roll of Honour in the Welsh Sports Hall of Fame

=== Swimming ===
- Alyson Jones (born 1956), English swimmer
- Burwell Jones (1933–2021), American swimmer
- Cullen Jones (born 1984), American swimmer
- Jenna Jones (born 2001), Australian swimmer
- Leisel Jones (born 1985), Australian swimmer

=== Track and field (athletics) ===
- Akela Jones (born 1995), Barbadian track and field athlete
- Hayes Jones (born 1938), American hurdler
- Lolo Jones (born 1982), American hurdler (and also bobsled pusher)
- Ron Jones (sprinter) (1934–2021), British sprinter

=== Other sports ===
- Allyce Jones (born 1987), American professional pickleball player
- Beth Bronger-Jones, American curler
- Colleen Jones (born 1959), Canadian curler and television personality
- Emerson Jones (born 2008), Australian tennis player
- Heather Jones (born 1970), Canadian field hockey player
- Kirsty Jones, Welsh professional kitesurfer
- Paige Jones (born 2002), American ski jumper
- S. D. Jones (1945–2008), Antiguan professional wrestler
- Tammy Jones, stage name of Debbie D'Amato, professional wrestler from the Gorgeous Ladies of Wrestling

=== Sports executives ===
- Whip Jones (1909–2001), American businessman and philanthropist, founder of Aspen Highlands

== Miscellaneous ==
- ABilly S. Jones-Hennin (1942–2024), American LGBT rights activist
- Aiyana Jones (2002–2010), African American girl who killed by a police officer
- April Jones (2007–2012), Welsh murder victim
- Calista Robinson Jones (1839-1913), nineteenth national president of the Woman's Relief Corps
- Casey Jones (1864–1900), American locomotive engineer, subject of an eponymous song
- Cornelia Hall Jones (1842–1911), Hawaiian philanthropist and clubwoman
- Genene Jones (born 1950), American serial killer
- Jodi Jones (died 2013), British female murder victim
- Kirsty Jones (died 2000), British female murder victim
- Marlon Jones (c. 1970–1980), Jamaican criminal
- Paul Roland Jones, 20th-century American criminal associated with the Chicago Outfit
- Phoenix Jones (born 1988), American real-life superhero
- Sara Roddis Jones (1909–1975), American clubwoman

== Fictional characters ==
- Bridget Jones, a novel and film character
- Casey Jones, human ally of the Teenage Mutant Ninja Turtles
- Cleopatra Jones, heroine of the 1973 blaxploitation film of the same name
- Davy Jones, main villain in the second two installments of the Pirates of the Caribbean series
- Fred Jones, a main character in the Scooby-Doo franchise
- Georgie Jones, from the American soap opera General Hospital
- Harriet Jones, British Prime Minister in Doctor Who
- Ianto Jones, a character in the BBC Three television series Torchwood
- Indiana Jones, titular main character of the Indiana Jones franchise
- Jessica Jones, Marvel Comics comic book character
- Jughead Jones, from Archie Comics
- Junie B. Jones, the titular main character of the children's book series by Barbara Park*
- Jones, the overthrown farmer in George Orwell's novel Animal Farm
- Lance-Corporal Jack Jones, a character from Dad's Army
- Loretta Jones, from the British soap opera Hollyoaks
- Lucas Jones, from the American soap opera General Hospital
- Martha Jones, a companion in the science fiction series Doctor Who
- Maxie Jones, from the American soap opera General Hospital
- Mercedes Jones, on television series Glee
- Mia Jones, in Degrassi: The Next Generation
- Michelle "MJ" Jones, a character from the Marvel Cinematic Universe
- Morgan Jones, a character in The Walking Dead franchise
- Neighbor Jones, Donald Duck's neighbor in Disney comics
- Osmosis Jones, the titular character of a 2001 Warner Brothers animated film
- Ralf Jones, from the SNK video game series
- Sam Jones, a character in the Doctor Who novel series Eighth Doctor Adventures
- Samantha Jones, a character in the television series Sex and the City
- Sophie Jones, several characters
- Waylon Jones, birth name of Killer Croc, a supervillain in American comic books published by DC Comics

== Disambiguation pages ==
- Aaron Jones (disambiguation)
- Abe Jones (disambiguation)
- Abraham Jones (disambiguation)
- Adam Jones (disambiguation)
- Al Jones (disambiguation)
- Alan Jones (disambiguation)
- Albert Jones (disambiguation)
- Aled Jones (disambiguation)
- Alex Jones (disambiguation)
- Alexander Jones (disambiguation)
- Alexandra Jones (disambiguation)
- Alfred Jones (disambiguation)
- Alice Jones (disambiguation)
- Allan Jones (disambiguation)
- Allen Jones (disambiguation)
- Allison Jones (disambiguation)
- Alun Jones (disambiguation)
- Amy Jones (disambiguation)
- Andre Jones (disambiguation)
- Andrew Jones (disambiguation)
- Andy Jones (disambiguation)
- Ann Jones (disambiguation)
- Anthony Jones (disambiguation)
- Arnold Jones (disambiguation)
- Arthur Jones (disambiguation)
- Audrey Jones (disambiguation)
- Austin Jones (disambiguation)
- Barbara Jones (disambiguation)
- Barrie Jones (disambiguation)
- Barry Jones (disambiguation)
- Ben Jones (disambiguation)
- Benjamin Jones (disambiguation)
- Bert Jones (disambiguation)
- Bill Jones (disambiguation)
- Billy Jones (disambiguation)
- Bob Jones (disambiguation)
- Bobby Jones (disambiguation)
- Bradley Jones (disambiguation)
- Brandon Jones (disambiguation)
- Brenda Jones (disambiguation)
- Brian Jones (disambiguation)
- Bruce Jones (disambiguation)
- Bryan Jones (disambiguation)
- Bryn Jones (disambiguation)
- Byron Jones (disambiguation)
- Caleb Jones (disambiguation)
- Calvin Jones (disambiguation)
- Cameron Jones (disambiguation)
- Caroline Jones (disambiguation)
- Carolyn Jones (disambiguation)
- Catherine Jones (disambiguation)
- Charles Jones (disambiguation)
- Christian Jones (disambiguation)
- Christopher Jones (disambiguation)
- Clarence Jones (disambiguation)
- Cliff Jones (disambiguation)
- Clinton Jones (disambiguation)
- Colin Jones (disambiguation)
- Damon Jones (disambiguation)
- Dan Jones (disambiguation)
- Daniel Jones (disambiguation)
- Danny Jones (disambiguation)
- Darren Jones (disambiguation)
- Darryl Jones (disambiguation)
- Daryl Jones (disambiguation)
- David Jones (disambiguation)
- Davy Jones (disambiguation)
- Deacon Jones (disambiguation)
- Dean Jones (disambiguation)
- Denise Jones (disambiguation)
- Dennis Jones (disambiguation)
- Derrick Jones (disambiguation)
- Diana Jones (disambiguation)
- D. J. Jones (disambiguation)
- Dominique Jones (disambiguation)
- Donald Jones (disambiguation)
- Dorothy Jones (disambiguation)
- Doug Jones (disambiguation)
- Earl Jones (disambiguation)
- Edgar Jones (disambiguation)
- Edith Jones (disambiguation)
- Edward Jones (disambiguation)
- Elijah Jones (disambiguation)
- Elizabeth Jones (disambiguation)
- Elwyn Jones (disambiguation)
- Emily Jones (disambiguation)
- Eric Jones (disambiguation)
- Ernest Jones (disambiguation)
- Ernie Jones (disambiguation)
- Esther Jones (disambiguation)
- Evan Jones (disambiguation)
- Frances Jones (disambiguation)
- Francis Jones (disambiguation)
- Frank Jones (disambiguation)
- Frankie Jones (disambiguation)
- Franklin Jones (disambiguation)
- Frederick Jones (disambiguation)
- Gabriel Jones (disambiguation)
- Gareth Jones (disambiguation)
- Gary Jones (disambiguation)
- Gene Jones (disambiguation)
- Geoffrey Jones (disambiguation)
- George Jones (disambiguation)
- Gerald Jones (disambiguation)
- Gerry Jones (disambiguation)
- Gordon Jones (disambiguation)
- Griffith Jones (disambiguation)
- Guy Jones (disambiguation)
- Gwyn Jones (disambiguation)
- Gwyneth Jones (disambiguation)
- Hannah Jones (disambiguation)
- Harold Jones (disambiguation)
- Harry Jones (disambiguation)
- Helen Jones (disambiguation)
- Henry Jones (disambiguation)
- Herbert Jones (disambiguation)
- Hilary Jones (disambiguation)
- Holly Jones (disambiguation)
- Howard Jones (disambiguation)
- Hubert Jones (disambiguation)
- Humphrey Jones (disambiguation)
- Ida Jones (disambiguation)
- Inigo Jones (disambiguation)
- Isaac Jones (disambiguation)
- Isaiah Jones (disambiguation)
- Ivan Jones (disambiguation)
- Ivor Jones (disambiguation)
- Jack Jones (disambiguation)
- Jacob Jones (disambiguation)
- Jacoby Jones (disambiguation)
- Jade Jones (disambiguation)
- Jake Jones (disambiguation)
- James Jones (disambiguation)
- Jamie Jones (disambiguation)
- Jasmine Jones (disambiguation)
- Jay Jones (disambiguation)
- Jaylon Jones (disambiguation)
- Jean Jones (disambiguation)
- Jeff Jones (disambiguation)
- Jennifer Jones (disambiguation)
- Jenny Jones (disambiguation)
- Jeremy Jones (disambiguation)
- Jerry Jones (disambiguation)
- Jesse Jones (disambiguation)
- Jill Jones (disambiguation)
- Jim Jones (disambiguation)
- Jimmy Jones (disambiguation)
- Joe Jones (disambiguation)
- Joey Jones (disambiguation)
- John Jones (disambiguation)
- John Paul Jones (disambiguation)
- Johnny Jones (disambiguation)
- Jon Jones (disambiguation)
- Jonathan Jones (disambiguation)
- Joseph Jones (disambiguation)
- Joshua Jones (disambiguation)
- Joy Jones (disambiguation)
- Julia Jones (disambiguation)
- Julius Jones (disambiguation)
- Keith Jones (disambiguation)
- Kelly Jones (disambiguation)
- Ken Jones (disambiguation)
- Kevin Jones (disambiguation)
- Kim Jones (disambiguation)
- Kingsley Jones (disambiguation)
- Larry Jones (disambiguation)
- Laura Jones (disambiguation)
- Laurence Jones (disambiguation)
- Lawrence Jones (disambiguation)
- Lee Jones (disambiguation)
- Leroy Jones (disambiguation)
- Leslie Jones (disambiguation)
- Lewis Jones (disambiguation)
- Linda Jones (disambiguation)
- Lloyd Jones (disambiguation)
- Louis Jones (disambiguation)
- Malachi Jones (disambiguation)
- Mandy Jones (disambiguation)
- Marc Jones (disambiguation)
- Marcus Jones (disambiguation)
- Margaret Jones (disambiguation)
- Marilyn Jones (disambiguation)
- Marion Jones (disambiguation)
- Mark Jones (disambiguation)
- Martin Jones (disambiguation)
- Marvin Jones (disambiguation)
- Mary Jones (disambiguation)
- Matthew Jones (disambiguation)
- Max Jones (disambiguation)
- Megan Jones (disambiguation)
- Melvin Jones (disambiguation)
- Michael Jones (disambiguation)
- Mick Jones (disambiguation)
- Milton Jones (disambiguation)
- Morgan Jones (disambiguation)
- Nathan Jones (disambiguation)
- Nathaniel Jones (disambiguation)
- Nicholas Jones (disambiguation)
- Nigel Jones (disambiguation)
- Noel Jones (disambiguation)
- Norman Jones (disambiguation)
- Oliver Jones (disambiguation)
- Owen Jones (disambiguation)
- Pat Jones (disambiguation)
- Patricia Jones (disambiguation)
- Patrick Jones (disambiguation)
- Paul Jones (disambiguation)
- Peter Jones (disambiguation)
- Philip Jones (disambiguation)
- Quincy Jones (disambiguation)
- Rachel Jones (disambiguation)
- Ralph Jones (disambiguation)
- Raymond Jones (disambiguation)
- Reginald Jones (disambiguation)
- Richard Jones (disambiguation)
- Rick Jones (disambiguation)
- Ricky Jones (disambiguation)
- Robert Jones (disambiguation)
- Rod Jones (disambiguation)
- Roderick Jones (disambiguation)
- Rodney Jones (disambiguation)
- Ron Jones (disambiguation)
- Ronald Jones (disambiguation)
- Rosie Jones (disambiguation)
- Roy Jones (disambiguation)
- Rufus Jones (disambiguation)
- Russell Jones (disambiguation)
- Ruth Jones (disambiguation)
- Ryan Jones (disambiguation)
- Sally Jones (disambiguation)
- Sam Jones (disambiguation)
- Samantha Jones (disambiguation)
- Samuel Jones (disambiguation)
- Sarah Jones (disambiguation)
- Seth Jones (disambiguation)
- Shawn Jones (disambiguation)
- Shirley Jones (disambiguation)
- Sidney Jones (disambiguation)
- Simon Jones (disambiguation)
- Sophie Jones (disambiguation)
- Spencer Jones (disambiguation)
- Stacy Jones (disambiguation)
- Stan Jones (disambiguation)
- Stella Jones (disambiguation)
- Stephen Jones (disambiguation)
- Steve Jones (disambiguation)
- Sue Jones (disambiguation)
- Ted Jones (disambiguation)
- Terry Jones (disambiguation)
- Theodore Jones (disambiguation)
- Thomas Jones (disambiguation)
- Tom Jones (disambiguation)
- Tommy Jones (disambiguation)
- Tony Jones (disambiguation)
- Trevor Jones (disambiguation)
- Victor Jones (disambiguation)
- Vincent Jones (disambiguation)
- Vivian Jones (disambiguation)
- Walter Jones (disambiguation)
- Watkin Jones (disambiguation)
- Wayne Jones (disambiguation)
- Wendell Jones (disambiguation)
- Will Jones (disambiguation)
- Willard Jones (disambiguation)
- William Jones (disambiguation)
- Willie Jones (disambiguation)
