= DL Jones =

DL Jones may refer to:

- Darwin Jones (soccer), also called Darwin L. Jones
- David L. Jones (botanist)
- David L. Jones (electronics engineer)

== See also ==
- List of people with surname Jones
