= Abe Jones =

Abe Jones may refer to:

- Abe Jones (baseball), 1880s–1890s African-American baseball player
- Abraham Jones (footballer) (1875–1942), English footballer (Middlesbrough, West Bromwich Albion, Luton Town), father of Abe Jones Jr
- Abe Jones Jr. (1899 – after 1923), English footballer (Birmingham, Reading, Brighton & Hove Albion, Merthyr Town), son of Abraham Jones (footballer)
- Abe Jones (politician) (born 1952), member of the North Carolina House of Representatives
- Abe Jones House on National Register of Historic Places listings in Oconee County, Georgia

== See also ==
- Abraham Jones (disambiguation)
