= Colin Jones =

Colin Jones may refer to:

- Colin Jones (artist, born 1928) (1928–1967), Welsh artist
- Colin Jones (systems artist) (born 1934), English Systems artist
- Colin Jones (boxer) (born 1959), Welsh boxer
- Colin Jones (footballer, born 1940) (1940–2016), English footballer for Chester
- Colin Jones (footballer, born 1963), English footballer for Mansfield Town
- Colin Jones (historian) (born 1947), British historian of France
- Colin Jones (priest), South African priest, Dean of St. George's Cathedral, Cape Town
- Colin Jones (American football) (born 1987), American football safety
- Colin Jones (photographer) (1936–2021), English photographer
- Colin Jones (gambler), American blackjack card-counting expert, teacher, and entrepreneur
- Colin Jones (model) (born 2003), American fashion model and transgender activist
