= Rosie Jones (disambiguation) =

Rosie Jones (born 1990) is a British actress and comedian.

Rosie Jones may also refer to:

== People ==
- Rosie Jones (golfer) (born 1959), American golfer
- Rosie Jones, an All-Tournament Player for the Central Missouri State team at the 1984 NCAA Division II women's basketball tournament and was 1985 Division II WBCA Player of the Year
- Rosie Jones, a British politician who stood in the 2015 Bath and North East Somerset Council election
- Rosie Jones, a British model featured on the Hot Shots Calendar

== Characters ==
- Rosie Jones, a character in the 2005 British film Keeping Mum

== See also ==
- Rosie Jones: Am I a R*tard?, a 2023 documentary about comedienne Rosie Jones
- Sweet Rosie Jones (1968), country music album by Buck Owens and his Buckaroos
- Rosie Llewellyn-Jones, Lucknow cultural historian based in London
- All pages with titles containing "Rosie" and "Jone"
- Rosie (given name)
- Rosie (disambiguation)
- Jones (surname)
- Jones (disambiguation)
