= Eugene Jones =

Eugene Jones may refer to:

- Eugene Jones (baseball) (1922–1960), American baseball player
- Eugene Kinckle Jones, co-founder of Alpha Phi Alpha fraternity at Cornell University
- Eugene Jones (Torchwood), fictional character
- Eugene S. Jones, filmmaker on A Face of War

== See also ==
- Gene Jones (disambiguation)
