= Marlon Jones =

Marlon Jones may refer to:

- Marlon Jones (American football) (born 1964), American football player
- Marlon Jones (gangster) (fl. 1980–2016), Jamaican gangster in the United States

== See also ==
- Marion Jones (disambiguation)
