= Cliff Jones =

Cliff or Clifford Jones may refer to:

- Cliff Jones (computer scientist) (born 1944), British computer scientist
- Cliff Jones (English footballer), footballer for Gainsborough Trinity and Burnley
- Cliff Jones (Welsh footballer) (born 1935), Wales international footballer
- Cliff Jones (rugby union) (1914–1990), Wales rugby international captain
- Cliff Jones (musician) (born 1968), British music producer and lead singer of Gay Dad
- Clifford A. Jones (1912–2001), Lieutenant Governor of Nevada
- Clifford L. Jones (1927–2008), Pennsylvania Republican Party chairman
- A. Clifford Jones (1921–1996), American politician in Missouri
