= Gerald Jones (disambiguation) =

Gerald Jones (born 1970) is a Welsh Labour Party politician.

Gerald Jones may also refer to:

- Gerald D. Jones (1933–2021), American politician in the state of Iowa
- Gerald Jones (philosopher), British philosopher
- Gerald Harvey Jones (1933–2017), American artist
- Gerald "Andre" Jones Jr. (born 1998), American football player

== See also ==
- Gerard Jones (born 1957), American writer
