= Sally Jones =

Sally Jones may refer to:

- Sally-Anne Jones (1968–2017), British-born terrorist and UN-designated recruiter who is believed to have been killed
- Sally Jones (journalist) (born 1954), British journalist
- Sally Forster Jones, Los Angeles-based real estate broker
- Sally Roberts Jones (born 1935), English-born Welsh poet, publisher and critic
- Sally Jones (long jumper), Welsh athlete
