= Diana Jones =

Diana Jones is the name of:

- Diana Wynne Jones (1934–2011), fantasy author
- Diana Jones (singer-songwriter) (born circa 1965), American singer-songwriter
- The Diana Jones Award, created in 2001 for excellence in gaming

See also:

- Jones (surname)
