= Eric Jones =

Eric Jones may refer to:

- Sir Eric Malcolm Jones (1907–1986), British intelligence officer
- Eric Jones (economic historian) (1936–2024), British-Australian economist and historian
- Eric Jones (footballer, born 1915) (1915–1985), English football player and manager
- Eric Jones (footballer, born 1931), English football player
- Eric Jones (racing driver) (born 1977), American racing driver
- Eric Jones (Road Rules), TV personality
- Eric Jones (climber) (born 1935), Welsh rock-climber, mountaineer and base jumper
- Eric Jones (comics) (1971–2022), American comic book artist
- Eric S. Jones (1914–1982), magistrate and politician in Newfoundland, Canada
- Eric Jones (rugby league), rugby league footballer of the 1930s, 1940s, and 1950s
- Eric Jones (American politician), U.S. representative for California's 4th congressional district

== See also ==
- Erik Jones (born 1996), American racing driver
