= Joy Jones (disambiguation) =

Joy Jones is an American writer and educator.

Joy Jones may also refer to:

- Joy D. Jones (born 1954), 13th Primary general president of the Church of Jesus Christ of Latter-day Saints
- Joy Farrall Jones, British painter and illustrator
