= Jill Jones (disambiguation) =

Jill Jones (born 1962) is an American singer and songwriter

Jill Jones may also refer to:

- Jill Jones (curler), American curler
- Jill Jones (poet) (born 1951), Australian poet
- Jill Marie Jones (born 1975), American actress
- Jill Jones (album), 1987

== See also ==
- Jones (surname)
- Jones (disambiguation)
