= Laura Jones =

Laura Jones may refer to:

- Laura Jones (artist), Australian artist, winner of the 2024 Archibald Prize with her portrait of author Tim Winton
- Laura Jones (economist), Canadian economist and policy analyst
- Laura Jones (gymnast) (born 1992), British gymnast
- Laura Jones (journalist) (born 1975), British television journalist
- Laura Jones (politician), American politician, member of the New Hampshire House of Representatives
- Laura Jones (screenwriter) (born 1951), Australian screenwriter
- Laura Jones (soccer) (born 1969), American soccer player
- Laura Anne Jones (born 1979), former member of the National Assembly for Wales
- Laura Jones (born 1960), American singer, better known by her stage name Laura Love
