= Mary Jones =

Mary Jones may refer to:

== People ==
=== American ===
- Mary Alice Jones (1898–1980), American children's writer
- Mary Cover Jones (1896–1987), American psychologist
- Mary Ellen Jones (chemist) (1922–1996), American biochemist
- Mary Ellen Jones (politician) (born 1936), educator and politician in New York State
- Mary Gardiner Jones (1920–2009), first woman to serve as a member of the Federal Trade Commission
- Mary Harris Jones (1837–1930), known as Mother Jones, Irish-born American community organizer
- Mary Jane Richardson Jones (1819–1909), American abolitionist and suffragist
- Mary Letitia Jones (1865–1946), librarian and head of Los Angeles Public Library 1900-1905
- Mary Smith Jones (1819–1907), first lady of the Republic of Texas
- Mary Jones (rower) (born 1986), American rower
- Mary Jones (physician) (c. 1828–1908), American physician
- Mary Jones (Peter Sewally), 19th century American sex worker
- Mary Jones Meyer, World Series of Poker champion
- Mary Cadwalader Rawle Jones (1850–1935), American author, socialite, and social leader
- Mary Estus Jones Webb (1924–1995), née Jones, mayor-president of Baton Rouge
- Mary Jones Berry, née Jones, American aerospace engineer
- Mary Jones Bradley (1920–2010), married name Jones, American heiress, racehorse owner and breeder

=== British ===
- Mary Jones (poet) (1707–1778), English poet
- Mary Jones (actress) (1896–1990), Welsh actress
- Mary Jones and her Bible (1784–1864), Welsh girl associated with Bible dissemination
- Mary Vaughan Jones (1918–1983), Welsh children's author and schoolteacher
- Mary Oliver Jones (1858–1893), Welsh-language novelist
- Mary Lloyd Jones (born 1934), Welsh painter and printmaker
- Molly Morgan (1762–1835), English convict, landowner, and farmer whose birth name was Mary Jones
- Mary Latchford Jones (1877–1968), Anglo-Irish politician
- Mary Whitmore Jones (c. 1823–1915), English author

== Brands ==
- Jones Soda#Mary Jones
