= Raymond Jones =

Raymond or Ray Jones may refer to:

== Sportspeople ==
- Raymond Jones (architect) (1925–2022), architect and Australian rules footballer for Collingwood, Melbourne, and South Fremantle
- Ray Jones (American football) (born 1947), American football player
- Raymond Jones (boxer) (1903–1978), Australian boxer
- Raymond Jones (cricketer) (born 1958), New Zealand cricketer
- Ray Jones (cyclist) (1918–1990), English road cyclist
- Ray Jones (footballer, born 1921) (1921–2008), Australian rules footballer for South Melbourne
- Ray Jones (footballer, born 1924) (1924–2007), Australian rules footballer for Geelong
- Ray Jones (footballer, born 1944) (1944–2007), English footballer who played for Chester City
- Ray Jones (footballer, born 1988) (1988–2007), English footballer who played for QPR

== Politicians ==
- Ray W. Jones (1855–1919), lieutenant governor of Minnesota
- Ray Jones (Western Australia politician) (1909–1967), MLC for Midlands Province
- Ray Jones (Queensland politician) (1926–2000), MLC for Cairns
- Ray Jones II (born 1969), member of the Kentucky Senate
- Ray C. Jones, member of the Oklahoma Senate
- J. Raymond Jones (1899–1991), American politician from New York

== Others ==
- Ray Jones (chaplain) (born 1934), Anglican priest
- Raymond Jones (composer), best known for his work on Doctor Who
- Raymond F. Jones (1915–1994), American science fiction author
- Raymond Ray-Jones (1886–1942), artist
- Wizz Jones (Raymond Ronald Jones, 1939–2025), English musician
- Ad hoc pseudonym of Alistair Taylor

== See also ==
- Raymond Bark-Jones (fl. 1930s), Wales international rugby union player
- Tony Ray-Jones (1941–1972), British photographer
