= Edith Jones (disambiguation) =

Edith Jones (born 1949) is a United States circuit judge and former chief judge.

Edith Jones may also refer to:

- Edith Jones (activist) (1875–1952), Australian activist
- Edith Irby Jones (1927–2019), American physician
- E. Yvonne Jones (born 1960), British molecular biologist
