= Abraham Jones =

Abraham Jones may refer to:

- Abraham Jones (footballer) (1875–1942), English footballer
- Abraham Jones (New York politician), member of 1st New York State Legislature
- Abraham Jones (North Carolina politician) in North Carolina General Assembly of 1778

== See also ==
- Abe Jones (disambiguation)
- Abraham Jonas (disambiguation)
