= Alice Jones =

Alice Jones may refer to:

- Alice Gray Jones (1852–1943), Welsh poet and editor
- Alice Ilgenfritz Jones (1846–1906), American writer and novelist
- Alice Jones (author) (1853–1933), Canadian author and travel essayist
- Alice Jones (poet), American poet and physician
- Alice Jones (skier) (born 1976), Australian Olympic alpine skier
- Alice Jones (swimmer), American swimmer
- Alice Eleanor Jones (1916–1981), American science fiction writer and journalist
- Alice Palache Jones (1907–1989), American banker
- Alice Jones, character in the TV series Casey Jones

== See also ==
- Mary Alice Jones (1898–1980), author of religious books for children
