= Ann Jones =

Ann Jones (or similar) may refer to:

== Writers ==
- Ann Jones (author) (born 1937), American writer on women's issues
- Anne Jones (writer) (born 1955), Australian editor and administrator
- Anna Jones (food writer), columnist and cookbook author
- Catherine Jones (novelist) (born 1956), who previously used the pen name Annie Jones

== Film and television personalities ==
- Ann Jones (Australian journalist) (born 1983), Australian environmental journalist, radio and television presenter
- Anna Jones (journalist) (born 1966), English business journalist and news presenter
- Anna Wilson-Jones (born 1970), English actress, primarily on television
- Annie Jones (actress) (born 1967), Australian actress

== Others ==
- Ann Jones (diver) (born 1949), Australian diver
- Ann Jones (politician) (born 1953), represents Vale of Clwyd in National Assembly of Wales
- Ann Jones (tennis) (born 1938), English table tennis and lawn tennis champion
- Anna H. Jones (1855–1932), Canadian-born American clubwoman, suffragist, and educator
- Anna Jones (businesswoman) (born 1975), British businessperson and entrepreneur
- Anne Griffith-Jones (1891–1973), Welsh educator in Malaysia and Singapore
- Annie Jones (bearded woman) (1865–1902), American circus attraction
- Annie Liao Jones (fl. 2009–2013), founder of Rock Candy Media
- Anne P. Jones (born 1935), American attorney
- Anna Russell Jones (1902–1995), African American artist
- Anna Faith Johnson Jones, American community activist

== Fictional characters ==
- Anna Jones (Indiana Jones character), the mother of Young Indiana Jones, starting in 1992
- Annie Jones, Ruth Gordon's mother in the 1953 film The Actress

== See also ==
- Ann Jonas (1932–2013), American children's writer and illustrator
- Jones (surname), including a list of people with the name
