= Marilyn Jones =

Marilyn Jones is the name of:

- Marilyn Jones (baseball) (1927–2015), American baseball player
- Marilyn Jones (dancer) (born 1940), Australian dancer
- Marilyn Mercer Jones (1917–2002), or Mars Jones, American female fishermen and boat captain
