= Ernest Jones =

Ernest or Ernie Jones may refer to:

== American football ==
- Ernie Jones (defensive back) (born 1953), American football player
- Ernie Jones (wide receiver) (born 1964), American football player
- Ernest T. Jones (born 1970), American football coach
- Ernest Jones (defensive lineman) (born 1971), American football player
- Ernest Jones (linebacker) (born 1999), American football player

== Other sportsmen ==
- Ernie Jones (Australian sportsman) (1869–1943), Australian cricketer and Australian rules footballer
- Ernest William Jones (1870–1941), Anglo-Welsh cricketer and trans-European shipping magnate
- Ernest Jones (footballer) (1871–1959), Australian rules footballer
- Ernest Jones (golfer) (1887–1965), English golfer
- Ernest Jones (rugby league), rugby league footballer of the 1910s and 1920s for Great Britain and England
- Mint Jones (Ernest Mint Jones, 1910–?), American baseball player
- Ernie Jones (footballer, born 1919) (1919–2011), footballer for Chester City
- Ernie Jones (footballer, born 1920) (1920–2002), Welsh footballer
- Ernie Jones (golfer) (1932–2019), Irish golfer

== Other people ==
- Ernest Charles Jones (1819–1869), English poet, novelist, and Chartist
- Ernest Lester Jones (1876–1929), American hydrographic and geodetic engineer
- Ernest Jones (psychoanalyst) (1879–1958), Welsh neurologist and psychoanalyst
- Ernest Jones (trade unionist) (1895–1973), English coal miner
- Ernie Jones (politician) (Ernest W. Jones, 1910–2005), Canadian politician
- Ernest Yarrow Jones (1872–1951), British painter, sculptor, and illuminator

== Other uses ==
- Ernest Jones (retailer), British jeweller and watchmaker
