= Willard Jones =

Willard Jones may refer to:

- Willard F. Jones (1890–1967), American naval architect, business executive and philanthropist
- Willard N. Jones (1869–?), American civil engineer, timber dealer and convicted felon
- Willard S. Jones, American college football coach
- Willard Jones (composer) (1919-1980) American composer, known for The Magic Sword, One Man's Way and Barnaby Jones
