= Movies in Fifteen Minutes =

- Available in: English
- Owner: Cleolinda Jones
- Creator: Cleolinda Jones
- Website: community.livejournal.com/m15m
- Current status: Online

Movies in Fifteen Minutes (known as m15m for short) is primarily the name of a set of Internet-based movie parodies by Cleolinda Jones (a pen name). The parodies first appeared in 2004 on Jones' LiveJournal, but have now been moved to a LiveJournal community of their own. There have been no new entries since 2012.

== Background ==
Jones wrote the first parody, Van Helsing in Fifteen Minutes, for fun; it appeared on her personal blog on 9 May 2004. Van Helsing in Fifteen Minutes proved surprisingly popular with readers on the internet. Jones' blog became so popular because of the m15m that she ran out of space for members, so she created a community for the parodies that would accept more members; she then posted subsequent movie parodies in this community.

== Book ==
Movies in Fifteen Minutes: Hollywood Blockbusters For People Who Can't Be Bothered
- Author: Cleolinda Jones
- Language: English
- Subject: Movies
- Genre: Parody
- Publisher: Orion Books
- Publication date: 20 October 2005
- Publication place: United Kingdom
- Pages: 416
- ISBN: 0-575-07687-9
- OCLC: 62889337

In 2004, Jones was asked by British publishing company Orion Books if she was interested in writing a book of the parodies. She was, and the book, Movies in Fifteen Minutes: Hollywood Blockbusters For People Who Can't Be Bothered was released in October 2005. It contains "the ten biggest movies ever," parodies not published online. The book is not currently available in the United States, though it has been published in Europe, where it met with praise.

== Characteristics ==
The parodies are written in the style of a screenplay and include references to popular culture, Internet fan culture and film trivia. Some use changes in font size and punctuation for comic effect, as in ''The Matrix in Fifteen Minutes''.

Jokes are made at the expense of plot holes, inconsistent character arcs, and bad dialogue amongst other things. The world of Internet fanfiction is also made fun of, with Jones making straight-faced, ridiculous claims about the characters even wilder than those made by the fanfic authors themselves.

== Popularity ==
The parodies are popular on the Livejournal site especially, despite being famous Internet-wide. This has caused various other people to write their own parodies, sometimes under the "Movies in Fifteen Minutes" name. Jones is the owner of the trademark ("Movies in Fifteen Minutes") under the common laws of the United States, and has said she is not comfortable with people using the name for their own parodies.
