= Roy Jones (disambiguation) =

Roy Jones may refer to:

- Roy Jones (aviator) (1893–1974), American pilot
- Roy Jones (bowls) (1904–?), Welsh international lawn bowler
- Roy Jones (footballer) (1924–2005), English footballer
- Roy Jones (rugby union) (1903–1993), Welsh rugby union player
- Roy Jones Jr. (born 1969), American boxer
- Roy Norris Jones (born 1970), American NASCAR driver
