= Earl Jones =

Earl Jones may refer to:

- Earl Jones (runner) (born 1964), American runner
- Earl Jones (basketball) (born 1961), American basketball player
- Earl Jones (politician) (born 1949), former member of the North Carolina legislature
- Earl Jones (investment advisor) (born 1942), Canadian who pleaded guilty to perpetrating a Ponzi scheme
- Earl Jones (pitcher) (1919–1989), Major League Baseball player
- Earl Jones (American football) (born 1957), American football cornerback
- Earl Jones (third baseman) (fl. 1937), American baseball player
- Robert Earl Jones (1910–2006), American actor and father of James Earl Jones

== See also ==
- James Earl Jones (1931–2024), American actor
