= Abraham Jonas =

Abraham Jonas may refer to:

- Abraham Jonas (politician) (1801–1864), American politician
- Abraham Jonas (rugby league) (1890–1933), Australian rugby league player

== See also ==
- Abraham Jones (disambiguation)
