= Norman Jones =

Norman or Norm Jones may refer to:

== Politicians ==
- Norman Jones (politician) (1923–1987), New Zealand legislator
- Norman L. Jones (1870–1940), American jurist and politician
- Gerry Jones (Norman Francis Jones, 1932–2017), Australian political organiser and legislator

== Other people ==
- Norman Sherwood-Jones (1911–1951), English Anglican bishop in Nigeria
- Norman Jones (actor) (1932–2013), English actor
- Norman Jones (boxer) (1930–1999), Australian Olympic boxer
- Norman Jones (footballer), English footballer of the 1920s
- Norman Jones (sailor) (1923–1995), Canadian-Bermudian sailor
- Norman Cyril Jones (1895–1974), English flying ace during World War I

== See also ==
- Noko (Norman Fisher-Jones, born 1962), English multi-instrumentalist musician, composer and producer
- Jones (surname)
