= Gabriel Jones =

Gabriel Jones may refer to:

- Gabriel Jones (politician) (1724–1806), 18th-century Welsh American lawyer and legislator
- Gabriel L. Jones (1858–1915), teacher, public official, and state legislator in Indiana
- Gabe Jones, fictional character appearing in American comic books
- Gabe Jones (soccer) (born 1973), American soccer player
- John Gabriel Jones (1752–1776), colonial American pioneer and politician
