= Victor Jones =

Victor Jones may refer to:

- Victor Jones (cricketer) (1881-1923), Australian cricketer
- Victor Jones (linebacker) (born 1966), American football player
- Victor Jones (running back) (born 1967), American football player
- Victor Jones (British Army officer), British Army officer

== See also ==
- Kenneth Victor Jones (1924–2020), British film score composer
- Reginald Victor Jones (1911–1997), British physicist
- Thomas Victor Jones (1920–2014), American businessman
