= Earl Jones (third baseman) =

American baseball player

- Third baseman
- Batted: Right Threw: Right

Negro league baseball debut
- 1937, for the Detroit Stars

Last appearance
- 1937, for the Detroit Stars
- Stats at Baseball Reference

Teams
- Detroit Stars (1937)

Earl Jones was an American Negro league third baseman in the 1930s.

Jones played for the Detroit Stars in 1937. In three recorded games, he posted two hits in ten plate appearances.
