= Gabriel L. Jones =

American teacher, public official and politician

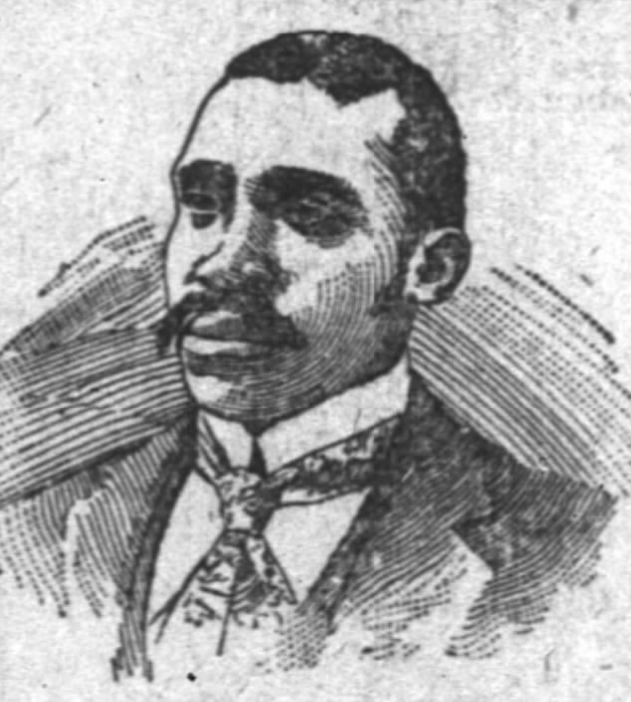

Indiana House of Representatives
- In office 1897–1897

Personal details
- Born: 1858 Sumner County, Tennessee
- Died: February 20, 1915 (aged 56–57) Indianapolis
- Cause of death: pneumonia
- Resting place: Crown Hill Cemetery and Arboretum, Section 56, Lot 328
- Party: Republican

Gabriel L. Jones (1858 - February 20, 1915) was a teacher, public official, and state legislator in Indiana. He represented the Marion County in the Indiana House of Representatives in 1897. He was a Republican.

== Biography ==
Jones was born in Gallatin in Sumner County, Tennessee, before moving to Indianapolis with his family in 1875. He went to public schools and after graduating from high school in 1883 he taught in the grade schools for seven years from 1883 until 1890. By the time he resigned from his teaching career he was an assistant principal.

Jones also worked as a member of the city police for several years, and worked for the internal revenue service in both Missouri and Illinois from 1890 until 1895. He served as deputy recorder for Marion County, Indiana, from 1895 to 1897.

He was selected as a candidate for representative at the Republican convention held in September 1896, which he successfully obtained. One of his Democratic opponents, Edward L. Little, hired someone to hand out hand-bills with an unrepresentative image of Jones, shown darker skinned and with a dice and daisy decorated neck-tie, to give the impression he was a "daisy dice shooter". After these were also plastered an walls Jones decided to take civil and criminal action for libel.

Jones was duly elected to the Indiana House of Representatives representing Marion County serving just one year in 1897. He was elected to serve as a Republican.

Jones was an advocate for the equal right for blacks in education and in February 1897 he put forth House Bill No. 46 known as "The Jones Bill" for the "equal educational facilities of colored children" as well as repealing Section 4496 of the existing law that allowed superintendents to form segregated schools. After much amendment the bill passed the House but was defeated in the Senate.

He was the last African American elected to the legislature for several decades with the next being representative Henry J. Richardson Jr. in 1932 and the next senator was Robert Broken in 1941.

Jones was an active member of the Bethel A.M.E. Church and was on its board of trustees. He was a member of the Grand United Order of Odd Fellows at the Garrett Smith lodge, and twice served as grand master. He was also a Mason, being a member of the Trinity lodge and a member of the Persian temple of Shriners.

== Death ==
He died February 20, 1915, from pneumonia at his home in Indianapolis. When he died he had been working for the United States Custom House as a watchman. He was survived by his wife Mrs. Addie Jones and son Benjamin Jones as well as his mother and sister. His funeral was at his Bethal A. M .E church and he was buried in Crown Hill Cemetery.

== See also ==
- African American officeholders from the end of the Civil War until before 1900
- List of African-American officeholders (1900–1959)
