= Noel Jones =

Noel Jones may refer to:

- Noel Jones (cricketer) (1891-1941), New Zealand cricketer
- Noel Jones (diplomat) (1940–1995), Indian-born British diplomat
- Noel Jones (Pentecostal bishop) (born 1950), senior pastor of the City of Refuge Church in Gardena, California
- Noel Jones (rugby league) (1919–1986), Australian World War II veteran and premiership rugby league
- Noël Jones (bishop of Sodor and Man) (1932–2009), Anglican bishop
