= Malachi Jones =

Malachi Jones may refer to:

- Malachi Jones (cricketer) (born 1989), Bermudian cricketer
- Malachi Jones (clergyman) (c. 1651–1729), British clergyman
- Malachi Jones (footballer) (born 2003), Sierra Leonean footballer
- Malachi Jones (gridiron football) (born 1994), American gridiron football player
