= Gordon Jones =

Gordon Jones may refer to:

== Sportspeople ==
- Gordon Jones (footballer, born 1886) (1886–1977), Builth F.C. and Wales international footballer
- Gordon Jones (footballer, born 1889), English football player for Bolton Wanderers, Tottenham Hotspur and several other clubs
- Gordon Jones (footballer, born 1943) (1943–2025), English football player for Middlesbrough
- Gordon Jones (Australian footballer) (1913–1999), Australian rules footballer
- Gordon Jones (baseball) (1930–1994), Major League Baseball pitcher
- Gordon Jones (American football) (born 1957), American football player

== Others ==
- Gordon Jones (actor) (1911–1963), noted for playing the Green Hornet in a movie serial
- Gordon Jones (folk musician) (born 1947), Scottish musician
- Doug Jones (politician) (Gordon Douglas Jones, born 1954), U.S. senator from Alabama
