= Russell Jones =

Russell Jones may refer to:

- Ol' Dirty Bastard (Russell Jones, 1968–2004), rapper
- Russell L. Jones, Welsh botanist
- Russell Jones (English cricketer) (born 1980)
- Russell Jones (Scottish cricketer) (born 1962), Scottish cricketer and Royal Air Force officer
- Russ Jones (born 1942), Canadian writer
- Russell Jones (ice hockey) (1926–2012), Australian ice hockey player
- Russell Jones (orientalist) (1926–2019), British Orientalist
- Russell Celyn Jones (born 1952), British writer and academic
- Russell Jones (politician) (born 1948), member of the Arizona House of Representatives
