= Spencer Jones =

Spencer Jones may refer to:

== People ==
=== Full name ===
- Spencer Cone Jones (1836–1915), American politician from Maryland
- Spencer P. Jones (1956–2018), New Zealand guitar player
- Spencer Jones (pitcher) (born 1994), American baseball player
- Spencer Jones (outfielder) (born 2001), American baseball player
- Spencer Jones (comedian), English comedian and actor
- Spencer Jones (rugby union) (born 1997), New Zealand-born Canadian rugby union player
- Spencer Jones (basketball) (born 2001), American basketball player

=== Surname ===
- Harold Spencer Jones (1890–1960), English astronomer

== Other uses ==
- 3282 Spencer Jones, an asteroid
- Spencer Jones (crater), a lunar impact crater
