= Vivian Jones =

Vivian Jones may refer to:

- Vivian Malone Jones (1942–2005), one of the first two African Americans to enroll at the University of Alabama in 1963
- Vivian Jones (singer) (1957–2025), Jamaican-born British reggae singer
- Vivian Vance or Vivian Roberta Jones (1909–1979), American actor
