= Melvin Jones =

Melvin Jones may refer to:

- Melvin Jones (Lions Club) (1879–1961), secretary-treasurer of Lions Clubs International
- Melvin Jones (American football) (born 1956), American football player
- Melvyn "Deacon" Jones (1943–2017), keyboard player and founding member of Baby Huey & the Babysitters
