= Shirley Jones (disambiguation) =

Shirley Jones (born 1934) is an American actress and singer.

Shirley Jones may also refer to:

- Shirley Jones (R&B singer) (born 1953), American singer from Detroit
- Shirley Brannock Jones (1925–2019), United States federal judge
- Shirley M. Jones (1939–2016), American politician and parks and recreation employee
- Shirley Jones (WRAF officer), British military officer
- Shirley Jones (artist) (born 1934), Welsh artist

== See also ==
- Inside Information Stakes, an American Thoroughbred horse race previously run as the Shirley Jones Stakes (1976 and 1979) and the Shirley Jones Handicap (1981–2009)
