= D. J. Jones =

D. J. Jones may refer to:

- D. J. Jones (offensive lineman) (born 1988), American football player
- D. J. Jones (defensive lineman) (born 1995), American football player
