= Clarence Jones =

Clarence Jones may refer to:

- Clarence Jones (American football) (born 1968), American football player
- Clarence Jones (baseball) (born 1940), Major League Baseball player
- Clarence Jones (missionary) (1900–1986), American missionary in Ecuador and by radio
- Clarence Jones (musician) (1889–1949), pianist and composer
- Clarence B. Jones (1931–2026), American lawyer and advisor to Martin Luther King
- A. Clarence Jones, American college football player
- Clarence "Jeep" Jones (1933–2020), American community activist
- Bill Jones (basketball, born 1966) (Clarence William Jones), American basketball player
- Jimmy Jones (tennis) (Clarence Medlycott Jones, 1912–1986), British tennis player and author
