= Stacy Jones (disambiguation) =

Stacy Jones (born 1970) is a singer, songwriter, and guitarist for the band American Hi-Fi.

Stacy Jones may also refer to:

- Stacy Jones (baseball) (born 1967), American baseball player
- Stacy Layne Matthews, stage name of Stacy Jones, American drag performer

== See also ==
- Stacey Jones (born 1976), New Zealand rugby league player
