= Allison Jones =

Allison Jones may refer to:

- Allison Jones (casting director) (born 1955), American film casting director
- Allison Jones (athlete) (born 1984), American Paralympic skier and cyclist
- Allison Jones (actress), American actress in Nightjohn
- Allison Jones Rushing (born 1982), American attorney and jurist

== See also ==
- Alyson Jones (born 1956), GP and swimmer
- Alison Jones, New Zealand sociologist
