= Inigo Jones (disambiguation) =

Inigo Jones (1573–1652) was an English architect.

Inigo Jones may also refer to:

- Inigo Jones (British Army officer) (1848–1914), British major-general
- Inigo Owen Jones (1872–1954), Australian meteorologist and farmer
