= LaKendrick Jones =

American football player (born 1979)

No. 86
- Positions: Offensive lineman, defensive lineman

Personal information
- Born: September 8, 1979 (age 47)
- Listed height: 6 ft 3 in (1.91 m)
- Listed weight: 300 lb (136 kg)

Career information
- College: South Carolina State
- NFL draft: 2003: undrafted

Career history
- San Francisco 49ers (2003)*; Columbus Destroyers (2004–2007); Los Angeles Avengers (2008); Georgia Force (2011)
- * Offseason or practice squad member only

Awards and highlights
- First-team All-Arena (2007)

Career AFL statistics
- Tackles: 93.5
- Sacks: 19
- Forced fumbles: 6
- Fumble recoveries: 2
- Pass breakups: 16
- Stats at ArenaFan.com

LaKendrick "Ken" Jones (born September 8, 1979) is an American former professional football lineman who played six seasons in the Arena Football League (AFL) with the Columbus Destroyers, Los Angeles Avengers, and Georgia Force. He played college football at South Carolina State University. He was also a member of the San Francisco 49ers of the National Football League (NFL).

== Early life and college ==
LaKendrick Jones was born on September 8, 1979.

Jones played for the South Carolina State Bulldogs from 1998 to 2002. He played in all 12 games his senior year in 2002, recording 53 tackles, 10 sacks, two pass breakups and three forced fumbles.

== Professional career ==
Jones signed with the San Francisco 49ers on May 2, 2003, after going undrafted in the 2003 NFL draft. He was released by the 49ers on July 16, 2003.

Jones was signed by the Columbus Destroyers of the Arena Football League (AFL) on November 14, 2003. He played both offensive line and defensive line from 2004 to 2006 as the AFL played under ironman rules. Ironman rules were eliminated in 2007. Jones played in 58 games overall for the Destroyers from 2004 to 2007. He earned first-team All-Arena honors as a defensive lineman in 2007 after posting 21 solo tackles, 16 assisted tackles, 10 sacks, three forced fumbles, two fumble recoveries, and four pass breakups. The Destroyers finished the 2007 season with a 7–9 record but won three straight playoff games to earn a berth in ArenaBowl XXI, where they lost to the San Jose SaberCats by a score of 55–33.

Jones signed with the AFL's Los Angeles Avengers on October 29, 2007, and played for the team during the 2008 season.

Jones was signed by the Georgia Force of the AFL on May 3, 2011. He was placed on injured reserve on May 23, 2011.
