= Willard N. Jones =

American politician, civil engineer and timber dealer

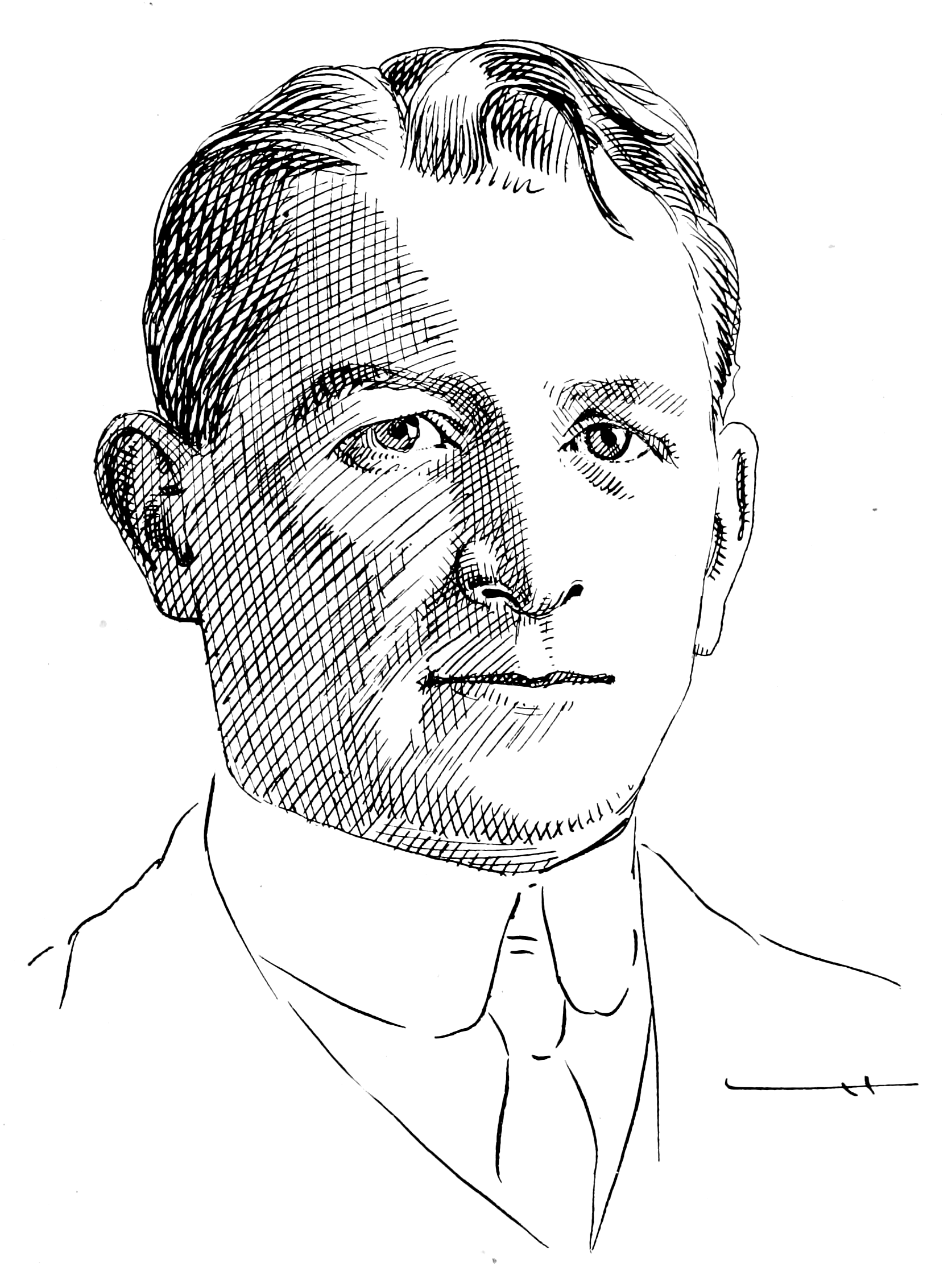
Willard N. Jones

Willard N. Jones (1869–?) was a civil engineer and timber dealer in the U.S. state of Oregon. He served as a Republican in the Oregon Legislative Assembly in 1903, and was convicted of fraud in 1906.

Jones was born in Pennsylvania in the year 1869 and educated at Alfred University. He moved west in 1887 and became a civil engineer, spending time in Minnesota, Montana, and British Columbia. He moved to Portland in 1891, where he worked as a timber salesman. He partnered with Stephen A. Douglas Puter, who was later known as the "Oregon land fraud king."
