= Wayne Jones =

Wayne Jones may refer to:

- Wayne Jones (darts player) (born 1965), English darts player
- Wayne Jones (footballer) (born 1948), Welsh footballer
- Wayne Jones (snooker player) (born 1959), Welsh snooker player
- Wayne Jones (politician) (1954-2019), American member of the Ohio House of Representatives
