= Renea Jones =

American politician (born 1966)

- Jones in 2026

Member of the Tennessee House of Representatives from the 4th district
- Incumbent
- Assumed office January 14, 2025
- Preceded by: John Holsclaw

Personal details
- Born: November 8, 1966 (age 60)
- Party: Republican
- Children: 2
- Education: North Carolina State University (BS, MS)
- Website: House website Campaign website

Renea Jones (born November 8, 1966) is an American politician and farm owner. She has served as a Republican member of the Tennessee House of Representatives since 2025. She represents the 4th district, encompassing Unicoi County and parts of Carter County.

== Early life and education ==
Renea Jones was born on November 8, 1966. Her father started the farming business, on which Jones worked while growing up. She attended North Carolina State University, where she graduated with a BS in horticultural science and an MS in crop science and integrated pest management.

== Career ==
Jones is a co-owner of Jones & Church Farms in Unicoi. She has served as the chair of the Unicoi County Republican Party and as president of Unicoi County's Farm Bureau, as well as a member of the Unicoi County School Board and the NFIB Tennessee Leadership Council.

== Tennessee House of Representatives (2025–present) ==
=== Elections ===
In January 2024, Jones announced that she would run for the 4th district seat in the Tennessee House of Representatives, held by retiring Republican John Holsclaw. She faced Elizabethton mayor Curt Alexander in the Republican primary and defeated him, receiving 4,485 votes to Alexander's 2,094. Because no other candidates filed to run, Jones won the general election uncontested.

She is running for re-election in 2026.

=== Tenure ===
In 2025, Jones was appointed by colleagues as a deputy whip.

Also in 2025, Jones introduced the "Caring for Caregivers Act," a bill that would create a pilot program offering 6,000 dollars to certain caregivers. She described the program as a way to help make up for the income that family members and other caregivers often lose while assisting those with conditions such as dementia and Alzheimer's disease.

== Personal life ==
Jones has two children and two grandchildren. She is a Baptist. She is a lifelong resident of East Tennessee.
