= Roy Jones (rugby union) =

- Full name: William Roy Jones
- Born: 22 February 1903 Swansea, Wales
- Died: 23 July 1993 (aged 90) Mumbles, Wales

Rugby union career
- Position: Centre
International career
| Years | Team | Apps | (Points) |
| 1927–28 | Wales | 2 | (0) |

William Roy Jones (22 February 1903 – 23 July 1993) was a Welsh international rugby union player.

A centre three–quarter, Jones captained his hometown club Swansea and was capped twice for Wales. He debuted against a touring 1927–28 Australian team (made up of New South Wales players only), then was overlooked for the 1928 Five Nations, before returning for the final fixture in Paris.

Jones served as both a selector and club president of Swansea.

== See also ==
- List of Wales national rugby union players
