= A. Clifford Jones =

American politician

Member of the Missouri Senate from the 7th district
- In office 1965–1988

Personal details
- Born: February 13, 1921 St. Louis, Missouri
- Died: October 9, 1996 (aged 75)
- Party: Republican
- Spouse: Nan Thornton
- Children: 4 (2 sons, 2 daughters)
- Education: Princeton University; Washington University
- Occupation: lawyer, businessman

A. Clifford Jones (February 13, 1921 - October 9, 1996) was an American politician who served in the Missouri Senate and the Missouri House of Representatives. He served in the U.S. Navy during World War II from 1942 until 1946, in the Atlantic, Pacific, and Indian oceans. Jones was appointed city clerk of Ladue, Missouri, from 1948 until 1950. He elected to the Missouri House of Representatives in 1950, serving until 1958 when he was the Republican nominee for St. Louis County supervisor. He served as Missouri Senate Republican floor leader from 1971 to 1976.

Jones died of cancer on October 9, 1996. His body was donated to the Washington University School of Medicine.
