= Sally Forster Jones =

American real estate agent

- Born: Germany
- Occupations: Executive Director, SFJ Group
- Known for: Broker of Aaron Spelling's the Spelling Manor, Regular contributor to WSJ, The Hollywood Reporter, Forbes
- Spouse: Donald Jones

Sally Forster Jones is a Los Angeles-based real estate broker. She is frequently featured as a subject matter expert on national publications such as the Wall Street Journal, CNN, Reuters and has appeared on The Hollywood Reporter's Top Real Estate Agents rankings on multiple years.

== Career ==
In 2011, Sally helped broker the $85 million sale of The Manor - a 123-room mansion in Los Angeles that had been built by the late TV producer Aaron Spelling. The initial listing of $150 million set a record at the time.

In 2014, Sally made Beverly Hills real estate history with the sale of 1181 North Hillcrest Road to her client Markus Persson, the Swedish creator of the Minecraft video game, for $70 million - the most expensive sale ever in Beverly Hills.
