= Clinton Jones =

Clinton Jones may refer to:

- Clinton Jones (footballer) (born 1984), Australian rules footballer
- Clinton Jones (American football) (born 1945), American football player
- Clinton Jones (priest) (1916–2006), American Episcopal priest and gay rights activist
- Clinton Leonard Jones (1892–1965), American World War I flying ace
- Clinton Jones (White Collar), a character from the USA Network series White Collar
- Clinton Jones, character in The Actress
- Clinton "Ton" Jones, presenter on Auction Hunters

== See also ==
- Clint Jones (born 1984), American ski jumper
