= Ivor Jones (disambiguation) =

Ivor Jones is the name of:

- Ivor Jones (1901–1982), Welsh rugby union player
- Ivor Jones (footballer) (1899–1974), Welsh footballer
- Ivor Jeffrey Jones, birth name of Jeff Jones (cricketer, born 1941), Welsh former cricketer
- Ivor Wynne Jones (1927–2007), Welsh journalist

== See also ==
- Ivor Roberts-Jones (1913–1996), English sculptor of Welsh descent
