= Marvin Jones =

Marvin Jones may refer to:

- John Marvin Jones (1882–1976), known as Marvin Jones and J. Marvin Jones, United States congressman
- Marvin Jones (linebacker) (born 1972), American football linebacker
- Marvin Jones Jr. (linebacker) (born 2004), American football linebacker
- Marvin Jones (wide receiver) (born 1990), American football wide receiver
- Marvin Jones (basketball) (born 1993), American basketball player
- Krondon (Marvin Jones III, born 1976), an American rapper and actor
