= Amy Jones =

Amy Jones may refer to:

- Amy Jones (cricketer) (born 1993), English cricketer
- Amy Jones (writer), Canadian writer
- Amy Jones (artist) (1899–1992), American artist and muralist
- Amy Holden Jones (born 1955), American screenwriter and film director
