= Donald Jones =

Donald or Don Jones may refer to:

== Arts and entertainment ==
- Donald Jones (actor) (1932–2004), Dutch actor and dancer
- Don Jones (arts) (1923–2015), American artist and art therapist
- Don Jones, actor in Agent Cody Banks 2: Destination London

== Politicians ==
- Don Jones (Louisiana politician) (born 1949), American politician; see list of Tau Kappa Epsilon members
- Don Jones (Montana politician), in Montana House of Representatives

== Sports ==
- Donald Jones (linebacker) (born 1969), American football linebacker
- Don Jones (safety) (born 1990), American football player
- Donald Jones (wide receiver) (born 1987), American football wide receiver
- Donnie Jones (basketball) (Donald Isaac Jones Sr., born 1966), American college basketball coach
- Donnie Jones (Donald Scott Jones Jr., born 1980), American football punter
- Don Jones (Canadian football), see Lionel Conacher Award
- Donald M. Jones, American football, basketball, and golf coach

== Others ==
- Don A. Jones (1912–2000), American admiral and civil engineer, with the United States Coast and Geodetic Survey, and the Environmental Science Services Administration Corps
- Don Jones (wireless health), American health care businessman
- Donald F. Jones (1890–1963), American geneticist
- Donald S. Jones (1928–2004), United States Navy admiral
- Donald Spence Jones (1836–1917), Anglican dean and author
