= Gene Jones =

Gene Jones may refer to:

- Gene Jones (golfer) (born 1957), American golfer
- Gene Jones (actor), American actor
- Gene Jones (American football) (born 1936), American football player

== See also ==
- Eugene Jones (disambiguation)
- Jean Jones (disambiguation)
