= Owen Jones (disambiguation) =

Owen Jones (born 1984) is an English columnist, commentator, journalist, author and political activist

Owen Jones may refer to:

- Owen Jones (American politician) (1819–1878), House of Representatives member from Pennsylvania
- Owen Jones (antiquary) (1741–1814), Welsh antiquary
- Owen Jones (architect) (1809–1874), British architect, son of the antiquary
- Owen Jones (Canadian politician) (1890–1964), Member of Parliament from British Columbia
- Owen Jones (footballer) (1871–1955), British footballer
- Owen Jones (forester) (1888–1955), English forester and aviator
- Owen Gethin Jones (1816–1883), Welsh building contractor, quarry owner and poet
- Owen Glynne Jones (1867–1899), British rock-climber and mountaineer
- Owen Thomas Jones (1878–1967), British geologist
- Owen Wynne Jones (1828–1870), British clergyman

== See also ==
- Owen Bennett-Jones, British journalist
- Owen Wansbrough-Jones (1906–1983), British chemist and soldier
- Berenice Owen-Jones, Australian civil servant
