= Frankie Jones =

Frankie Jones may refer to:

- Frankie Jones (reggae singer), 1970s/1980s Jamaican singer, also known as Jah Frankie Jones
- Frankie Jones (boxer) (1933–1991), Scottish flyweight/bantamweight boxer
- Frankie Jones (gymnast) (born 1990), Welsh Olympic gymnast
- Frankie Lee (blues musician) (1941–2015), American soul blues singer-songwriter, born Frankie Lee Jones
