= Ivan Jones =

Ivan Jones may refer to:

- Ivan Jones (author), British writer
- Ivan Jones (rugby league) (1942–2015), Australian rugby league player
- Boogaloo Joe Jones (born 1940, Ivan Joseph Jones), jazz guitarist
- Ivan Jones (Emmerdale), a character on the British soap opera Emmerdale
- Ivan Jones (British Army officer) (born 1966), British general
