= Rufus Jones =

Rufus Jones may refer to:

- Rufus Jones (writer) (1863–1948), American writer, philosopher and Quaker
- Rufus R. Jones (1933–1993), American wrestler
- Parnelli Jones (1933–2024), American racing driver; full name Rufus Parnell Jones
- Rufus E. Jones (1940–2019), American politician
- Rufus Jones (actor) (born 1975), English actor, comedian and writer
- Rufus Jones (athlete) (born 1976), Grenadian Olympic sprinter
- Rufus "Speedy" Jones (1936–1990), American jazz drummer
