= Laura Jones (soccer) =

American soccer player (born 1969)

Personal information
- Date of birth: October 15, 1969 (age 57)
- Place of birth: Yorba Linda, California, U.S.
- Height: 5 ft 9 in (1.75 m)
- Position: Full-back

Youth career
- Los Angeles Nightmares

College career
Years	Team	Apps	(Gls)
1987–1990	Colorado College Tigers	?	(17)

International career
1992	United States	1	(0)

Laura Jones (born October 15, 1969) is an American former soccer player who played as a defender, making one appearance for the United States women's national team.

== Career ==
Jones played basketball and volleyball for the Esperanza Aztecs in high school, while playing club soccer for the Nightmares youth team in Los Angeles. In college, she played for the Colorado College Tigers from 1987 to 1990, having been offered an athletic scholarship by Colorado College. In total, she scored seventeen goals and recorded six assists for the Tigers. She was a Second-Team All-American in 1988 and 1989, and was included in the Senior Recognition Team selection in 1990.

Jones was selected to compete at the U.S. Olympic Festival in 1986 and 1989. She made her only international appearance for the United States on August 16, 1992 in a friendly match against Norway, which finished as a 2–4 loss.

Her career was ended after blowing out her knee. Jones has coached girls' and boys' club youth soccer teams.

== Personal life ==
Jones is from Yorba Linda, California, and graduated with a Bachelor of Arts in English from Colorado College. She works as an elementary school teacher, having received her credentials at California State University, Fullerton, and her master's degree in education from Grand Canyon University. She currently teaches at Rolling Hills Elementary School in Fullerton, California.

== Career statistics ==
=== International ===
United States
Year	Apps	Goals
1992	1	0
Total	1	0
