= Abe Jones Jr. =

English footballer

Abe Jones
Personal information
- Full name: Abraham Jones
- Date of birth: April 1899
- Place of birth: West Bromwich, England
- Position: Forward

Senior career*
| Years | Team | Apps | (Gls) |
- West Bromwich Sandwell
| 1919–1921 | Birmingham | 3 | (2) |
| 1921–1922 | Reading | 24 | (5) |
| 1922–1923 | Brighton & Hove Albion | 6 | (1) |
| 1923–1924 | Merthyr Town | 19 | (6) |
| 1924–19?? | Stoke | 0 | (0) |
- * Club domestic league appearances and goals

Abraham Jones (April 1899 – after 1923) was an English professional footballer who played as a forward in the Football League for Birmingham, Reading, Brighton & Hove Albion and Merthyr Town in the early 1920s. He was also on the books of Stoke.

Jones was born in West Bromwich, Staffordshire, the son of West Bromwich Albion and Middlesbrough footballer Abraham Jones. He played local football for West Bromwich Sandwell before joining Birmingham in 1919. He made his debut in the Second Division deputising for Harry Hampton in a home game against Fulham on 6 April 1920, scoring both goals in a 2–0 win. Though Jones retained his place for the next two games, Hampton kept him out of the side thereafter, and in August 1921 he moved on to Reading. A season later he joined Brighton & Hove Albion, after another year went to Merthyr Town, and then to Stoke.
