= Shawn Jones =

Shawn Jones may refer to:

- Shawn Jones (American football) (born 1970)
- Shawn Jones (basketball) (born 1992)
- Shawn Jones (musician) (born 1976), American singer and songwriter
