= Jasmine Jones (disambiguation) =

Jasmine Jones (born 2001) is an American track and field athlete.

Jasmine Jones may also refer to:

- Jasmine Jones (bobsledder) (born 1996), American bobsledder
- Jasmine Cephas Jones (born 1989), American actress

== See also ==
- Jasmine Lee-Jones, Black British playwright and actress
