= Muriel Jones =

South African dancer and philanthropist (1890 – 1974)

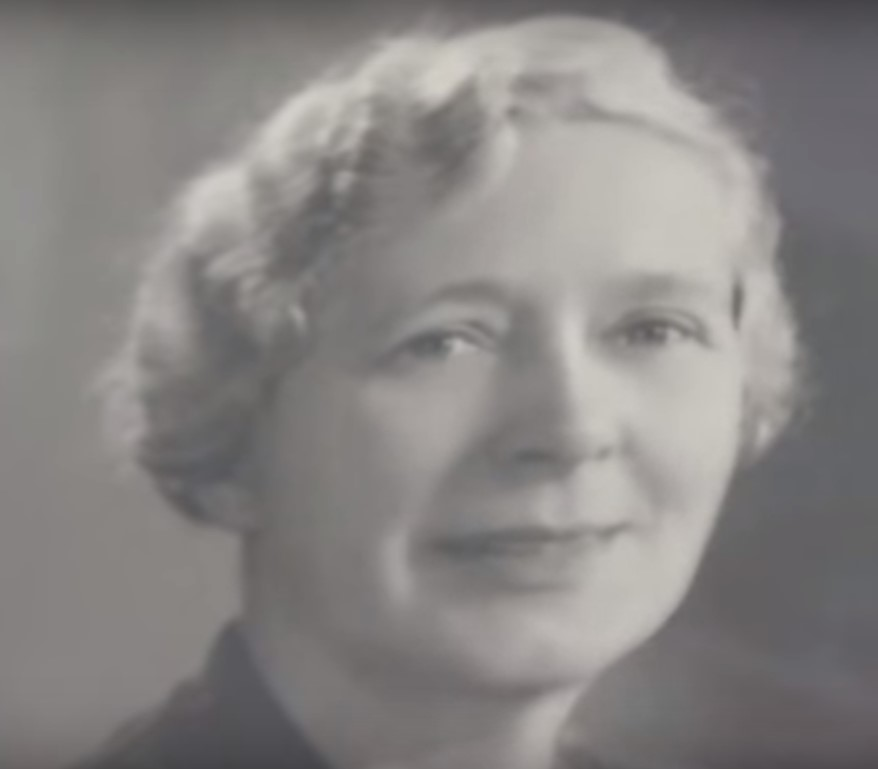
- Born: 1890; Newport, Wales
- Died: 1974; Cape Town, South Africa
- Known for: Dance, philanthropy
- Spouse: Harold Higgs Jones

Muriel Jones (1890 – 1974) was a South African dancer and philanthropist.

== Biography ==
She was born in Newport, Wales and attended the University of Cape Town. In Cape Town, she became a member of the National Council of Women of South Africa and was elected Life Vice President in 1963. She danced with the University of Cape Town (UCT) Ballet, with whom she took a tour to Rhodesia in 1956.

She was involved with many charitable activities. Among other things, she was an early activist for enhancing the living conditions in Cape Town slums. In 1939, she was portrayed as thinking about the three basic problems in the slums: juvenile delinquency, intemperance and marijuana. She was active in raising the housing standard in area slums.

After the Second World War, she corresponded with The Emergency Committee of Atomic Scientists in Post-War America. During a visit to the United States in 1945, in an interview referencing wine, drunkenness and land prices in South Africa, she was described as: 'a charming personality and delightful conversationalist'.

She was married to Harold Higgs Jones (1888-1968). At her death, she left a house to the Young Men's Christian Association, that is now the Little Stream Conference Centre in Cape Town.
