= Ryan Jones (disambiguation) =

Ryan Jones (born 1981) is a Welsh rugby union player.

Ryan Jones may also refer to:

- Ryan Jones (footballer, born 1973), Welsh footballer
- Ryan Jones (footballer, born 1992), English football goalkeeper
- Ryan Jones (footballer, born 2002), English footballer
- Ryan Jones (ice hockey) (born 1984), Canadian ice hockey forward
- Nick Jones (basketball) (Ryan Nicholas Jones, born 1945), American basketball player
