= Darren Jones (disambiguation) =

Darren Jones (born 1986) is a British politician.

Darren Jones may also refer to:

- Darren Jones (footballer) (born 1983), Welsh footballer
- Darren Jones (screenwriter), British author who has written for the French animated TV series Zou

== See also ==
- Daryn Jones, Canadian television personality
- Daron Jones, American singer, formerly a member of 112
