= Colin Jones (artist, born 1928) =

Welsh artist (1928–1967)

Colin Herbert Beyne Jones (1928–1967) was a Welsh artist who was 38 years old when he died.

Jones was born in Newport, South Wales and studied for an Art Teachers’ Diploma at Cardiff School of Art. He became part of the Merthyr Tydfil art scene. He was described by Professor Tony Curtis as one of the most promising artists of his generation. A decade before his death he converted to Catholicism; he was deeply proud of his Welsh roots and was a passionate Francophile. These three facets of his life were major influences in his work.

Best known as a painter, his depictions of the South Wales valleys are his most powerful legacy. ‘Pithead Funeral’, a response to the Aberfan disaster that affected him deeply, stands out amongst his work together with 'Fallen Figure'. His miner’s paintings series was produced following a week he spent sketching underground in a Welsh coal mine. In sharp contrast are the paintings and drawings produced as a result of the considerable time he spent in the Languedoc region of France.

Four of his paintings are in the permanent collection of the National Museum of Wales. Other examples of his work are held by Newport Museum and Art Gallery, Swansea's Glyn Vivian Art Gallery, Cardiff and Aberystwyth Universities and Liverpool Museum.

His pictures have been widely exhibited throughout England and Wales both during his lifetime and also in recent years (see artist's website).
