= Audrey Jones =

Audrey Jones may refer to:

- Audrey Evelyn Jones (1929–2014), English teacher and campaigner for women's rights
- Audrey Jones Beck (1924–2003), American art collector and philanthropist
