= Jean Jones =

Jean Jones may refer to:

- Jean Jones (Colorado) in Colorado Women's Hall of Fame
- Jean Jones (lawn bowler) (born 1932), international lawn bowler from Jersey
- Jean Jones (artist) (1927–2012), English painter

== See also ==
- Gene Jones (disambiguation)
