= Megan Jones =

Megan Jones may refer to:

- Megan Jones (politician) (born 1988), Iowa politician
- Megan Jones (equestrian) (born 1976), Australian equestrian and Olympic medalist
- Megan Jones (rugby union) (born 1996), English and Welsh rugby union player
- Megan K. Jones (born 1974), American political strategist
