= Leroy Jones =

Leroy Jones may refer to:

- Leroy Jones (gridiron football) (1950–2021), American football player in the United States and Canada
- Leroy Jones (boxer) (1950–2010), heavyweight
- Leroy Jones (trumpeter) (born 1958), American jazz musician
- LeRoy J. Jones Jr. (born 1957), American politician

== See also ==
- Leroi Jones or Amiri Baraka (1934–2014), American writer of poetry, drama, fiction, essays and music criticism
