= Daryl Jones =

Daryl Jones may refer to:

- Daryl Jones (politician) (born 1955), politician from Miami, Florida, United States
- Daryl Jones (baseball) (born 1987), American baseball outfielder
- Daryl Jones (American football) (born 1979), former American football wide receiver
- Daryl Jones (sprinter), winner of the 1982 NCAA Division I outdoor 4 × 400 meter relay championship

== See also ==
- Darryl Jones (disambiguation)
