= Jacob Jones =

Jacob Jones may refer to:

- Jacob Jones (basketball) (born 1949), American basketball player
- Jacob Jones (curler) (born 2001), Canadian curler
- Jacob Jones (footballer) (born 2001), Welsh footballer
- Jacob Jones (naval officer) (1768–1850), American naval officer
- Jacob Jones (rugby league) (born 1999), English rugby league footballer
- USS Jacob Jones

== See also ==
- Jake Jones (disambiguation)
