= Anya Jones =

American aerospace engineer

Anya Rachel Magaña Jones is an American aerospace engineer who works at the University of California, Los Angeles as a professor in the department of mechanical and aerospace engineering and director of the Separated and Transient Aerodynamics Laboratory. Her research concerns fluid dynamics and aerodynamics. She studies three-dimensional flows that are not in a steady state, as can arise for aircraft in gusty winds or with moving airfoils, both experimentally and theoretically.

== Education and career ==
Jones is originally from New Orleans. She studied both aeronautical engineering and mechanical engineering at the Rensselaer Polytechnic Institute, graduating magna cum laude in 2004, and received a master's degree in Aeronautics and Astronautics from the Massachusetts Institute of Technology in 2006. There, she was involved in the Silent Aircraft Initiative of the Cambridge–MIT Institute, leading her to continue her studies in England at the University of Cambridge, in Fitzwilliam College. She completed her Ph.D. in 2010 with the dissertation Unsteady low Reynolds number aerodynamics of a waving wing, under the supervision of Holger Babinsky.

While at Cambridge, she also competed for Cambridge as a double blue in fencing and rowing, including a seat on the 2010 Blue Boat.

She joined the University of Maryland, College Park as an assistant professor of aerospace engineering in 2010, and was promoted to associate professor in 2017 and full professor in 2021. In 2024 she moved to her present position at the University of California, Los Angeles.

== Recognition ==
Jones was a 2016 recipient of the National Science Foundation CAREER Award and the Presidential Early Career Award for Scientists and Engineers. She has been a Fulbright Scholar at the Technion – Israel Institute of Technology and a Humboldt Fellow at TU Braunschweig in Germany.

She was named as a Fellow of the American Physical Society (APS) in 2025, after a nomination from the APS Division of Fluid Dynamics, "for novel contributions in experimental fluid dynamics with an emphasis on investigating the underlying flow physics of unsteady aerodynamic phenomena that are relevant to gusting flows, flapping wings, helicopter rotors, and the control of those flows".
