= Oliver Jones =

Oliver Jones may refer to:

- Oliver Jones (Irish MP) (died 1664), Welsh-Irish soldier and member of the Parliament of Ireland
- Oliver Jones (judge) (died 1682), Irish politician and judge of the seventeenth century
- Oliver Jones (businessman) (1821–1899), Canadian politician
- O. W. Jones (1897–1975), American politician
- Oliver Jones (pianist) (1934–2026), Canadian jazz pianist, organist and composer
- Oliver C Jones (born 1985), British artist
- Oliver Jones (visual effects artist), British visual effects artist
- Oliver Wendell Jones, a character in the comic strip Bloom County
- Oliver Jones (soccer) (born 2003), Australian footballer
- Oliver Jones (The Bold and the Beautiful), a character on soap opera The Bold and the Beautiful
- Ollie Jones (cricketer) (born 2006), Scottish international cricketer
- Ollie Jones (cyclist) (born 1996), New Zealand racing cyclist
- Ollie Jones (songwriter) (1923–1990), American singer and songwriter
- Skream (Oliver Dene Jones, born 1986), English producer
- Oliver Stark (Oliver Leon Jones, born 1991), English actor
