= Rachel Jones =

Rachel Jones may refer to:

- Rachel Jones (artist) (born 1991), British artist
- Rachel Bay Jones (born 1969), American stage actress and singer
- Rachel Jones (Maryland politician) (born 1984), member of the Maryland House of Delegates
- Rachel Jones (Arizona politician), member of the Arizona House of Representatives
- Rachel Leah Jones (born 1970), American-Israeli documentary film director and producer
- Rachel Jones Koresh, née Rachel Jones
- Rachel Jones (radio producer), the producer of The Chris Moyles Show
- Rachel Jones, namesake of Rachel, West Virginia
- Rachel Jones (singer), in the bands The Reasoning and Karnataka
- Rachel Jones (biathle), who competes in modern biathlon
- Rachel Jones, fictional writer of Coffee, Tea or Me?
- Rachel Jones (Neighbours), fictional character on Australian soap opera Neighbours

== See also ==
- Rachael K. Jones, American writer and editor of speculative fiction
