= Dennis Jones =

Dennis Jones may refer to:

- Dennis Jones (Australian footballer) (1936–1999), Australian rules footballer
- Dennis Jones (Australian politician) (1874–1936), Australian politician
- Dennis Jones (footballer, born 1894) (1894–1961), English footballer
- Dennis Jones (Kansas politician), American lawyer and politician
- Dennis Jones (musician) (born 1958), American blues rock musician
- D. F. Jones (Dennis Feltham Jones, 1918–1981), British writer
- Dennis Jones (Florida politician) (born 1941), American politician
- Dennis M. Jones (1938–2016), American businessman

== See also ==
- Denis Jones (1906–1987), Irish politician
- Denny Jones (1910–2012), American rancher and politician
