= Adam Jones =

Adam Jones may refer to:

== People ==
- Adam Jones (American football) (born 1983), also known as Pacman Jones, retired NFL cornerback
- Adam Jones (baseball) (born 1985), baseball outfielder
- Adam Jones (racing driver) (born 1980), English auto racing driver
- Adam Jones (referee), Welsh rugby referee.
- Adam Jones (rugby union, born 1981), Wales and British Lions international rugby union prop
- Adam Jones (rugby union, born 1980), Wales international rugby union lock
- Adam Jones (musician) (born 1965), guitarist for the progressive metal band Tool
- Adam Jones (Canadian scholar) (born 1963), political scientist, writer, and photojournalist
- Adam Jones (lacrosse) (born 1989), Canadian lacrosse player
- Adam Jones (political adviser), British special adviser
- Adam Jones (running back), American college footballer
- Adam Garnet Jones, Canadian filmmaker and screenwriter

== Other uses ==
- Adam Jones, the main character in the film Burnt
- Adam Jones, a character in the TV series Between
- The Adam Jones Show, sports radio talk show host on WBZ-FM, Boston, Massachusetts
