= Gerald Jones (philosopher) =

UK philosopher and educator

Gerald Jones is a London-based philosopher, educator and textbook author.

Gerald Jones has spent his professional career in adult education. Since 1990 he has written and lectured in Philosophy and Critical Thinking, and was a visiting lecturer at the Institute of Education between 1996 and 2006. He later became an educational administrator and educational theorist. He was Head of Humanities at the Mary Ward Centre before becoming head of the community education service for the London Borough of Ealing, and afterwards the head of adult learning for the London Borough of Lewisham. He is now Principal of the Waterloo Centre of Morley College.

As editor of the collection Gatekeepers, Midwives and Fellow Travellers: The Craft and Artistry of the Adult Educator (2005) he put forward a practical approach to understanding adult education and its aims, which has become known as Gatekeeper theory, and has been widely discussed.

He is also associated with the idea of moral blindspots, which he developed in an article for Philosophy Now in 2018, and which has been referenced in U.S. political newspaper The Hill.

Jones has authored or co-authored more than ten books aimed at learners in philosophy, including Exploring Ethics. Along with Jeremy Hayward and Dan Cardinal, he has co-written the best-selling Philosophy in Focus textbooks, published by Hodder Education and intended to assist with the AQA A level philosophy syllabus.

Jones is also notable as a pioneer of teaching philosophy through games, and has devised many such games, often in collaboration with Jeremy Hayward.

== Books ==
- Exploring Ethics, Jones, Hayward & Mason, (London: John Murray 2000)
- Sartre’s Existentialism & Humanism, Jones, Hayward & Cardinal (London: John Murray 2003)
- Epistemology: the Theory of Knowledge, Jones, Hayward & Cardinal (London: John Murray 2004)
- The Philosophy of Religion, Jones, Hayward & Cardinal (London: Hodder Murray 2005)
- Ethik: Entdeken, Verstehen, Anwenden (Dortmund: Auer-Verlag 2005)
- Gatekeepers, Midwives and Fellow Travellers: The Craft and Artistry of the Adult Educator, (2005), Gerald Jones, Mary Ward Centre
- Descartes' Meditations, Jones, Hayward & Cardinal (London: Hodder Murray 2005)
- Moral Philosophy: a Guide to Ethical Theory, Jones, Hayward & Cardinal (London: Hodder Murray 2006)
- Plato’s Republic, Jones, Hayward & Cardinal (London: Hodder Murray 2007)
- An Introduction to Philosophy for AS Level, Jones, Hayward & Cardinal (London: Hodder Education 2008)
- Philosophy for AS Level, Jones, Hayward & Cardinal (London: Hodder 2014)
- Philosophy for A Level, Jones, Hayward & Cardinal (London: Hodder 2015)
