= Bradley Jones =

Bradley or Brad Jones may refer to:

== Sports ==
- Brad Jones (racing driver) (born 1960), Australian racing driver
- Brad Jones (ice hockey) (born 1965), American former professional ice hockey left winger
- Brad Jones (soccer) (born 1982), Australian footballer
- Brad Jones (American football) (born 1986), American football linebacker
- Brad Jones (basketball) (born c. 1969), American basketball coach
- Bradley Jones (snooker player) (born 1974), English former snooker player

== Other ==
- Brad Jones (bassist) (born 1963), American jazz bassist
- Bradley Jones Jr. (born 1965), minority leader of the Massachusetts House of Representatives
- Brad Jones (born 1981), American film critic, actor, filmmaker, YouTuber, comedian, and the creator and star of The Cinema Snob
