= Julius Jones =

Julius Jones may refer to:

- Julius Jones (American football) (born 1981), former American football running back
- Julius Jones (prisoner) (born 1980), American prisoner and former death row inmate in Oklahoma

== See also ==
- Julio Jones (born 1989), American football wide receiver
