= Sophie Jones =

Sophie Jones may refer to:

- Sophie Jones (English footballer) (born 1992), English footballer
- Sophie Jones (fl. 2011–2014), ice dancer who participated in the British Figure Skating Championships
- Sophie Jones (American soccer) (born 2001), American soccer player
- Sophie Jones (film), a 2020 American drama film, or the title character
- Sophie Jones, a fictional character in the 2019 comic series Chrononauts: Futureshock
- Sophie Jones, a fictional character in the Indiana Jones series
