= Max Jones =

Max Jones may refer to:

- Max Jones (journalist) (1917–1993), British journalist
- Max Jones (ice hockey) (born 1998), American professional ice hockey forward
