= Stella Jones =

Stella Jones may refer to:

- Stella Jones (singer), singer who represented Austria in the Eurovision Song Contest 1995
- Stella Jones (writer), New Zealand playwright
- Stella Maude Jones (1889–1955) American archivist, historian, and librarian
- Stella Jones (Emmerdale), character in the British TV-series Emmerdale
