= Brenda Jones =

Brenda Jones may refer to:

- Brenda Jones (athlete) (born 1936), Australian middle-distance runner
- Brenda Jones (politician) (born 1959), American politician from the state of Michigan
- Brenda Jones (wrestler) (born 1984), American professional wrestler
- Brenda Jones (singer) (1954–2017), singer with the American R&B vocal trio The Jones Girls
