= Kelly Jones (disambiguation) =

Kelly Jones (born 1974) is a Welsh singer and frontman of the Stereophonics.

Kell(e)y or Kellie Jones may also refer to:

- Kelly Jones (Miss Alabama) (born 1976/1977), American beauty pageant titleholder
- Kelley Jones (rower) (born 1965), American Olympic rower
- Kelly Jones (tennis) (born 1964), American former tennis player
- Kelly Jones, Los Angeles based singer who released the album Little Windows with Teddy Thompson
- Kelly Jones, head girl in St Trinian's
- Kelley Jones (born 1962), comic book artist
- Kelley Jones (American football) (born 2004), American football player
- Kellie Jones, see Harvest Rain Theatre Company
- Kellie Jones (born 1959), American academic
