= Joy Jones =

American writer and educator

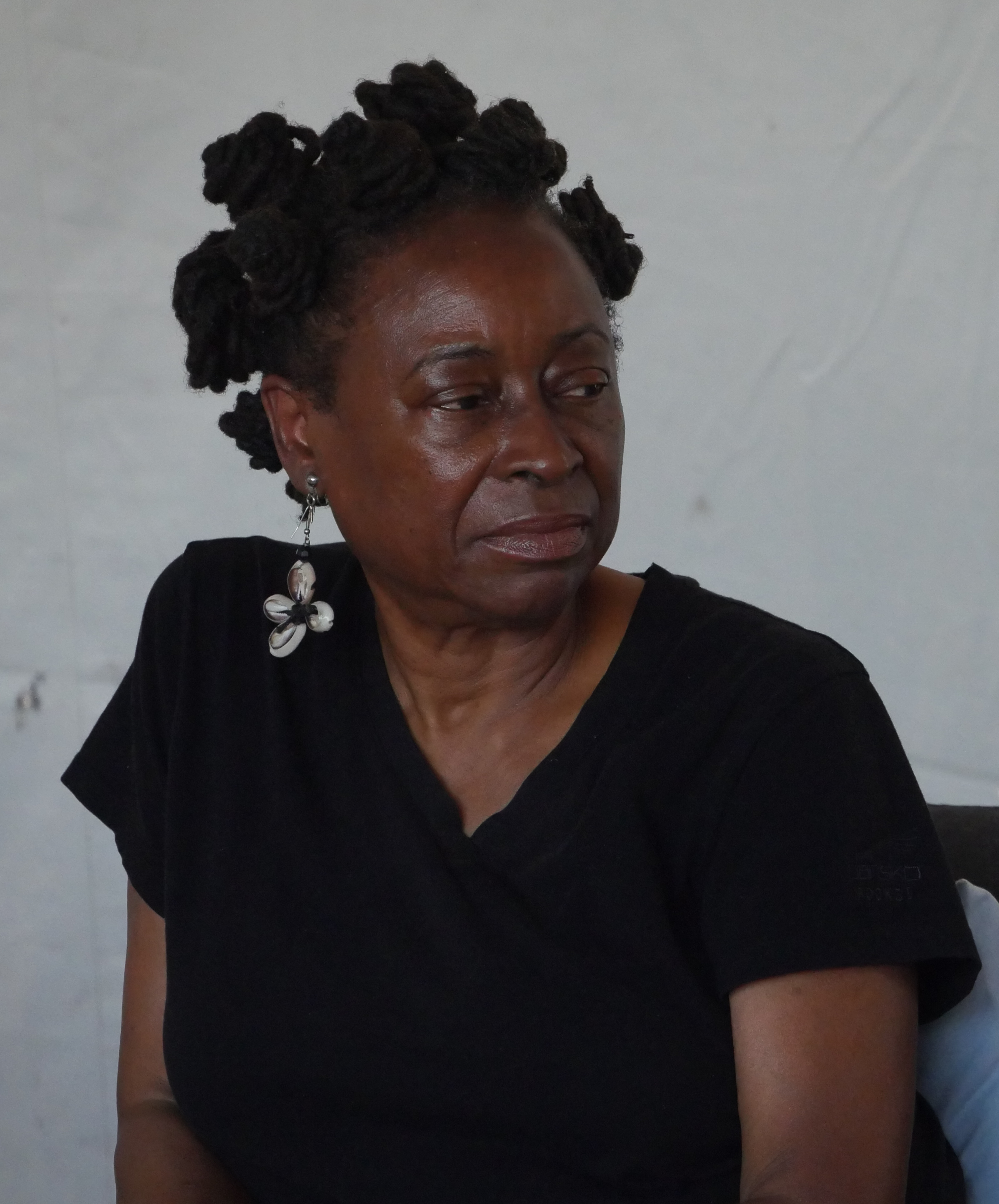
Joy jones, 2025

Joy Jones is an American writer and educator, a magna cum laude graduate of the University of Detroit. She spent 12 years as a teacher, trainer, and administrator in the Washington D.C. public school system. She has written several books for adults and children and her articles have been published by The Washington Post. As of 2014, she works for the District of Columbia Public Library.

== Biography ==
Jones is the daughter of W. Morgan and Marilyn Jones, and grew up in Washington D.C. She was inspired to write the children's novel Tambourine Moon, based on her fathers stories of him growing up on King's Bend, located near Selma, Alabama.

== Books written ==
- Between Black Women: Listening With The Third Ear
- Tambourine Moon (Simon & Schuster)
- Private Lessons: A Book Of Meditations For Teachers
- Fearless Public Speaking (Sterling Publishing)
- Jayla Jumps In (Albert Whitman & Co.)
- The Sky Is Not Blue (Free Spirit)
- A Marriage That Changed the World: Lois and Bill Wilson and the Addiction Recovery Movement (Greenbelt Publishers), co-authored with Tom Adams, MSW
