= Byron Jones =

Byron Jones may refer to:

- Byron M. Jones, Canadian Christian film producer
- Byron Q. Jones (1888–1959), American aviator and military officer
- Byron Jones (American football) (born 1992), American football player
- Byron Jones (basketball), American basketball player
- B. Todd Jones (born 1957), acting director of the United States Bureau of Alcohol, Tobacco, Firearms and Explosives, and United States Attorney for the District of Minnesota
