= Darryl Jones (disambiguation) =

Darryl Jones (born 1961) is an American bass guitarist.

Darryl Jones may also refer to:

- Darryl Jones (baseball) (born 1951), American former Major League Baseball player
- Darryl Jones (footballer), played in 2011–12 Ayr United F.C. season
- Darryl Jones (fire chief), Chief of Pittsburgh Bureau of Fire
- Darryl Jones (swimmer) (born 1948), English female swimmer

== See also ==
- Daryl Jones (disambiguation)
