= Aled Jones (disambiguation) =

Aled Jones (born 1970) is a Welsh singer and a television and radio presenter.

Aled Jones may also refer to:

- Aled Gruffydd Jones, Welsh historian
- Aled Haydn Jones (born 1976), British radio presenter and former radio producer

== See also ==
- Alex Jones (disambiguation)
