= Edith Jones (activist) =

Australian activist

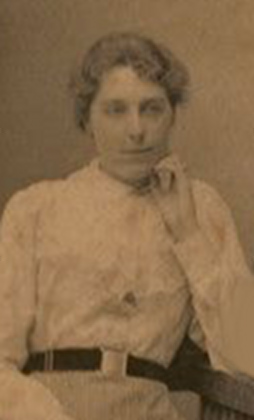
- Jones circa 1900
- Born: Edith Brown; 1875; Clapham, United Kingdom
- Died: 24 November 1952 (aged 76–77); Bromley, Kent

Edith Emily Jones (1875–1952) was an English-born Australian activist, noted for her advocacy for Indigenous Australians in the 1920s.

== Early life and marriage ==
Born Edith Brown in Clapham, she initially trained as a school teacher, before meeting the Rev. John Jones, a clergyman from the Church of England. The two were married in London in 1904, and the couple embarked for Australia later that year, when John was appointed as head of the Anglican church mission on Thursday Island (being both the Sub-Dean of Quetta Cathedral and the Tutor of the theological college).

== Career ==
Although returning to England briefly in 1910, by 1912 John was the general secretary of the Australian Board of Missions, based in Sydney. The couple moved again in the 1920s, this time to St Kilda in Melbourne, where Edith was appointed as a Justice of the Peace in the Victorian Children's Court. She also joined the Victorian Women Citizens' Movement and became its president, also standing for election for the federal seat of Fawkner in 1925, although she withdrew from the race prior to polling day.

Jones' increasing activism and expertise in Indigenous matters was recognised in 1929, when she gave evidence to a royal commission on the status and conditions of Indigenous people in Australia. In her evidence, she argued for federal control of Indigenous affairs, and advocated for greater legal recognition of the rights of Indigenous women. She was exceptionally critical of the prevailing race policy of the time, noting that Indigenous people were being exploited as a result of "the stealing of their women and the supplying to them of intoxicants in order to facilitate these thefts", and testified that a matron at a mission near Alice Springs had alleged that "I cannot keep these little children in the compound, they are enticed out by the white men, and more half-castes are then being born".

Returning to England with her husband in 1930, Jones continued to issue a series of papers that were critical of the treatment of Indigenous people in Australia. She formed a committee within the Anti-Slavery and Aborigines' Protection Society in 1932 to coordinate international campaigns to put pressure on the Australian government over the issue, and both she and her husband continued to agitate for reform to laws that discriminated against indigenous people in the areas of health, education, and citizenship. She died in 1952 in Kent.
