= Marilyn Mercer Jones =

American fisherman and ship captain (1917–2002)

Mars Jones
- Born: Marilyn Mercer Jones; December 19, 1917; Wilbur, Washington
- Died: May 22, 2002 (aged 84); Port Angeles, Washington
- Education: West Seattle High School (graduated in 1937)
- Occupations: Commercial fisherman; yacht charter skipper; secretary-treasurer in the Port Angeles Charter Boat Association
- Organizations: Washington State Commercial Passenger Fishing Vessel Association; Charter Boat Association (Port Angeles, Washington)
- Known for: Was one of the first women licensed to fish commercially and work as yacht charter skipper in Neah Bay and Port Angeles, Washington. Shared a family business running boat trips for fishing purposes with her husband and managed the charter business branch.
- Spouse: Gaylord Jones (married 1937)
- Children: 4

Marilyn Mercer Jones (December 19, 1917 – May 22, 2002), better known as Mars Jones, was one of the first female fishermen and captains of the Pacific Northwest. At different times, Jones lived and worked in Seattle, Bainbridge Island, Neah Bay, and Port Angeles. As of 1955, Jones was the first woman in the Neah Bay area to obtain a Coast Guard license, and two years later, she became one of the few women licensed to operate a six-passenger boat. In 1972, she was one of two Port Angeles female skippers, and the only female charter skipper with a third class radio-operator's license. As of 1989, Jones was one of two or three charter skippers in Port Angeles and one of eight or nine in Neah Bay. At the time, Jones was referred to in media as the "lady skipper" or "lady captain."

Early in her career, Mars Jones worked as a singer in her husband Gaylord's jazz band. The two shared sportfishing as a hobby. Later, the couple seized the opportunity to earn more money as fishermen. They combined music and fishing for some time, but later dedicated their full attention to fishing. In 1948, they entered commercial fishing with a small boat running close to shore. As their income increased, the couple bought a larger boat and entered the charter boat business in 1952, providing services to other fishermen. Mars assisted Gaylord for three years, sometimes serving as skipper. In 1955, she started to run charter boats around Neah Bay on her own. Soon after that, she got her licenses and officially became a skipper. For about five years, Jones ran different boats for several employers, until in 1958 she bought the first boat she owned by herself. In 1969, she got her second boat, Satin Doll–the first fiberglass boat, and one of the biggest charter boats, in the Port Angeles harbor at the time.

From 1962 until at least 1989, Mars and Gaylord Jones successfully conducted businesses in Neah Bay and Port Angeles. Mars fully managed the chartering activities, occasionally operating sightseeing trips. Alongside their own business, the Joneses sometimes worked under the management of the Big Salmon Resort in Neah Bay. Among their clientele was Eddie Bauer, noted American outdoorsman, inventor, author, and businessman.

From 1958 to 1989, Jones owned and operated four different boats and sometimes ran other owners' boats. She had earned commercial and bottomfish licenses for vessels of different capacity. Jones worked until at least 1989. She endured gender discrimination, but became highly esteemed by her colleagues and clientele in the marine circles of Port Angeles and Neah Bay. Her son, son-in-law, and sometimes granddaughter also engaged occasionally in fishing, boat charters, and skin-diving charters.

Jones was a member of the Washington State Commercial Passenger Fishing Vessel Association. She helped organize the Charter Boat Association in Port Angeles, a body that helped to pass certain marine regulations. For a period of time, she served as its secretary-treasurer.

== Early life and education ==
Jones was born on a wheat farm in Wilbur, Washington, on December 19, 1917.

She spent her pre-school years on a farm in eastern Washington and the rest of her childhood in West Seattle.

Jones graduated from West Seattle High School in 1937. Later, she learned about water vessels and fishing, including the maintenance of boat engines and fishing gear, by assisting Gaylord during sportfishing trips.

== Career ==
After a few years of marriage, Mars and her husband, Gaylord Jones, worked as jazz musicians. Gaylord played piano and Mars played percussion and sang. Their first concert was in 1939 on the University of Washington campus followed by a larger concert in the old Metropolitan Theater in Seattle.

=== Entering commercial fishing and chartering ===
The couple went sportfishing every weekend they could, and Mars especially liked salmon fishing. They began commercial fishing in 1948. They fished from June to August; the rest of the year, they kept working as musicians.

At first, the couple got a small boat and fished as kelpers: day fishermen who fish along the beaches without going far out to sea. They used their sportfishing gear to fish, but as the laws changed, they were obliged to use only "commercial gear to catch commercial fish." Mars worked as bait boy, cleaned fish, and did other jobs under her husband's supervision. As they worked in the small "kicker boats," the couple saved money to invest in bigger vessels.

In the early 1950s, the Joneses moved to Bainbridge Island. In 1952, they bought a larger boat and entered the charter boat business, running boats for fishermen clientele. For three year, Gaylord was the skipper and Mars assisted him. Sometimes when her husband got sick, Mars took on skipper duties.

=== Becoming a captain ===
In 1955, Jones started running charter boats around Neah Bay, Washington on her own. Soon after, she was one of the first women to get her Coast Guard license. In 1957, she was licensed to operate a six-passenger boat, and later, 12-passenger boats. She was also licensed for commercial fishing.

Jones was drawn to chartering more than commercial fishing. She worked at three or four different charter boats for several employers for five years or so. In 1958, Jones got her first own boat, Vagabond, which she ran until 1969.

=== Business in Port Angeles and Neah Bay ===
In 1962, the Joneses fully retired from their music career and moved to Port Angeles, Washington. They became full-time fishermen and started their own business, running separate boat trips. To ensure stable income, they mixed chartering with commercial fishing. Mars ran charter boats for fishermen all year round fully managing that branch of the family business, while Gaylord combined chartering and trolling. In winter, Jones ran charter boats in Port Angeles, working alone due to the decreased number of customers. From mid-April on, she chartered out of Neah Bay, where she lived on her boat and usually hired deckhands (including her granddaughter) to help her. She often took a vacation in August.

In Neah Bay, the Joneses worked under the management of the Big Salmon Resort, and headquartered their boats there. In Port Angeles, they moored their boats in Boat Haven mooring.

In 1972, Mars Jones was one of two Port Angeles female skippers. Beside her own boat, Satin Doll, she sometimes operated her husband's boat, the 36-foot-long (11 m) Sea Mars, named after herself. She was also the only female charter skipper to have a third class radio-operator's license at the time.

By 1972, Jones was considered "one of the most respected, in every way" charter boat skippers both in Port Angeles and Neah Bay, and her salmon-fishing skills were highly esteemed. Jones received high appraisals of her professional skills from the president of the Olympic Charter Boat Association and her other colleagues. Nevertheless, in a number of interviews, Jones told stories of gender discrimination from several clients. Once, a commercial fisherman rammed her boat during a trip, but other than that, she claimed to have never had troubles with colleagues.

From 1973 or 1977, Mars operated her third boat, Satin Doll II. She kept chartering and occasionally did sightseeing tours. Jones' work as charter fisherman was partially regulated by state and federal agencies and by charter fishing organizations such as the Charter Boat Association, which she helped organize in Port Angeles.

In 1979 and 1980, the charter business in Port Angeles suffered badly, partially due to the gasoline shortage and mainly due to a storm resulting in destruction of the Hood Canal Bridge, which connected the Seattle area with the Olympic Peninsula. The customer flow decreased, and Jones' business was about 40 percent of normal. To maintain income during the crisis, she got a license to fish bottomfish commercially.

Jones' clientele were mostly from Washington State with occasional guests from other states and abroad. In 1983, the Joneses provided chartering services to Eddie Bauer, noted American outdoorsman, inventor, author, and businessman.

Mars worked in chartering and commercial fishing until at least 1989. During that period, she was one of eight or nine charter skippers in Neah Bay and one of two or three in Port Angeles.

=== Vessels ===
From 1958 to 1969, Jones operated the first boat she owned by herself, Vagabond, which was 26 feet (7.9 m) long.

In 1969, the Joneses sold Vagabond and ordered a new custom-built boat for $35,000 ($256,000 in 2020 dollars (Note: The approximate value converted to 2020 dollars, based on a standard adjustment of the 1969 dollar value using the Consumer Price Index as calculated by United States Department of Labor.)) or $45,000 ($329,000) from Sequim's West Bay Boat Company; reports vary. Jones' son-in-law, Frank Fritzer, helped build it. Jones had trouble getting the bank to finance the boat in her name, but eventually, the argument was resolved in her favor.

The boat was complete a few days after the Joneses' 33rd wedding anniversary. It was the first fiberglass boat in Port Angeles harbor. It was a 12-passenger boat, with a diesel engine, radar, echo-sounder, citizens band and marine radios, and a stereo tape setup. According to some, the boat was 38 feet (12 m) long with almost 14 feet (4.3 m) beam; others record it 42 feet (13 m) long, which would have made it the biggest charter boat in Port Angeles harbor. Jones named her new boat Satin Doll (or Satin Doll I) after one of her favorite songs by Duke Ellington, which was Jones' specialty number during her music career. Mars did all the maintenance except for engine upkeep, which she let Gaylord do.

From 1973 or 1977, Mars operated her third boat, Satin Doll II. It was a 43-foot-long (13 m) 22-passenger boat with a twin-diesel engine and automatic pilot. Satin Doll I went to Gaylord for commercial fishing purposes.

Later, the Jones family had another boat, Tracy Jo, named after Gaylord and Mars' granddaughter.

== Recognition ==
Over the years, Jones was often noted in newspaper articles as one of the few female skippers in Port Angeles and Neah Bay.Writers were amused by the fact and referred to Jones as the "lady skipper" or "lady captain." Jones' business activity was often featured in a number of newspaper notes and fishing summaries.

A biographical interview with Jones was featured in Winds of Change: Women in Northwest Commercial Fishing (1989). The book was a result of a four-year-long study of females in commercial fishing along the coast from Northern California to Alaska.

== Memberships ==
Jones was a member of the Washington State Commercial Passenger Fishing Vessel Association. She helped organize the Charter Boat Association in Port Angeles, Washington, around 1972 or 1973. She was a highly esteemed member of the association and for a period of time served as its secretary-treasurer. Later, branch offices of the Charter Boat Association were established in the towns of Westport and Ilwaco in Washington State.

== Personal life ==
In 1937, after graduating school, Mars married Gaylord Jones in Seattle, and they spent their honeymoon salmon fishing. Afterwards, Gaylord spent a few years in the army. When he came home, the couple began a jazz band and shared their love of sportfishing. After starting a family, Mars and Gaylord Jones settled in Bainbridge Island to raise their children in a more rural area.

The Joneses had three daughters and one son. When the children were old enough, the Joneses took them along on their working trips. Usually, their son spent time with Gaylord and Mars focused on the girls.

By 1989, Jones' son, Gaylord Jones III, and one of her sons-in-law entered fishing and chartering, including the skin-diving charter business. Their son worked as full-time teacher at Chehalis Elementary School, working in his parents' business in the summers. Jones' granddaughter, who was a pre-med student in 1989, sometimes worked as Mars' deckhand in the summer.

Jones had several hobbies: she painted with watercolor and oil, and loved to garden and cook. She particularly enjoyed baking bread.

In 1972, Jones had a mascot on her boat: a dog named Gob.

Mars Jones died in Port Angeles, Washington, on May 22, 2002.

== See also ==
- Neah Bay, Washington
- Skipper
- Commercial fishing
- Recreational fishing
- Yacht charter
- Eddie Bauer

== Literature cited ==
- "CPI Inflation Calculator", Bureau of Labor Statistics, Washington: United States Department of Labor
- "Late king cops PA ladder prize", The Daily News, Port Angeles: Daily News, p. 15, June 1, 1977, OCLC 17011320
- "Area fishing have everything but fishermen", Seattle Daily Times, Seattle: The Seattle Times Company, p. 22, June 1, 1979, ISSN 2639-4898, LCCN sn86072007, OCLC 1765328
- Seamens Dobbs, Karen, ed. (May 1, 2016), "WSHS Alumni Chinook lost list-years ending in "2" & "7"", Chinook, vol. XXXIX, Seattle: West Seattle High School Alumni Association, pp. 10–11, 32
- Allison, Charlene J.; Jacobs, Sue-Ellen; Porter, Mary A. (1989), Winds of change: women in Northwest commercial fishing, Seattle: University of Washington Press, ISBN 0295968400, LCCN 89016422, OCLC 476747344
- Chapman, Scooter (April 22, 1977a), "Friday frantics", The Daily News, Port Angeles: Daily News, p. 9, OCLC 17011320
- Chapman, Scooter (November 30, 1977b), "Townsend and Sequim ready for cage slate", The Daily News, Port Angeles: Daily News, p. 12, OCLC 17011320
- Freer, Blaine (January 11, 1983), "Fishing conditions ruined by weather", Seattle Post-Intelligencer, Seattle: Leigh S. J. Hunt, pp. B6, ISSN 0745-970X, LCCN sn83045605, OCLC 3734418
- Keeting, Virginia (June 5, 1970), Webster, Esther B. (ed.), "Lady skipper's new boat", Port Angeles Evening News, Port Angeles: Smith & Webster, p. 12, LCCN sn86071979, OCLC 14286099
- Reid, John (March 21, 1972b), "Salmon spurn expert crew", The Spokesman-Review, Spokane: Cowles Company, p. 19, ISSN 1064-7317, LCCN sn84024754, OCLC 11102610
- Reid, John (March 23, 1972a), "Lady Captains tight ship", The Spokesman-Review, Spokane: Cowles Company, p. 19, ISSN 1064-7317, LCCN sn84024754, OCLC 11102610
- Roskelly, Fenton (March 20, 1972), Curley, Rob (ed.), "July, September tops for salmon", Spokane Daily Chronicle, Spokane: Cowles Company, p. 18, LCCN sn88085302, OCLC 61313128
- Webster, Dan (May 27, 1990), "Two new books explore Washington's diversity", The Spokesman-Review, Spokane: Cowles Company, p. 48, ISSN 1064-7317, LCCN sn84024754, OCLC 11102610
- Wilfong, Chuck (March 20, 1972), "Marine diesels sweet music to gal singer-turned-skipper", Daily Chronicle, Centralia: Ray W. Edinger, p. 6, LCCN sn86071991, OCLC 14287376
