= Vincent Jones =

Vincent Jones may refer to:

- Vincent Jones (musician), Canadian musician
- Vincent Jones (historian) (1915–2003), military historian
- Vince Jones (born 1954), jazz musician
- Vince Jones (politician) (1910–1971), member of the Queensland Legislative Assembly
- Vincent Jones (One Life to Live), a fictional character on the US soap opera One Life to Live
- Vinnie Jones (born 1965), actor and former footballer
