= Jake Jones =

Jake Jones may refer to:

- Jake Jones (baseball) (1920–2000), American baseball player
- Jake Jones (basketball) (born 1949), American basketball player
- Jake Jones (footballer) (born 1993), English footballer

== See also ==
- Jacob Jones (disambiguation)
