= Dominique Jones (disambiguation) =

Dominique Jones (born 1988) is an American professional basketball player.

Dominique Jones may also refer to:

- Dominique Jones (born 1994), American rapper known professionally as Lil Baby
- Dominique Jones (American football) (born 1987)
