= Seth Jones (disambiguation) =

Seth Jones is an American ice hockey defenseman (born 1994).

Seth Jones may also refer to:

- Seth Jones (political scientist) (born 1972), American political scientist
- Seth Jones, a dime novel by Edward S. Ellis, in the E. F. Beadle series of the Beadle Company
