= Jade Jones =

Jade Jones may refer to:

- Jade Jones (taekwondo) (born 1993), British taekwondo athlete and twice Olympic gold medallist
- Jade Jones (singer) (born 1979), singer in the boy band Damage
- Jade Jones-Hall (born 1996), British Paralympic wheelchair racer
