= Lee Jones =

Lee Jones may refer to:

- Rita Lee (1947–2023), Brazilian musician
- Lee Jones (author), poker author and former cardroom manager for PokerStars
- Lee Jones (footballer, born 1970), Welsh footballer, goalkeeper
- Lee Jones (footballer, born 1973), Welsh footballer, striker
- Lee Jones (footballer, born 1975), New Zealand international football (soccer) player
- Lee Jones (golfer) (1874-1937), American golfer
- Lee Jones (rugby union) (born 1988), of Edinburgh Rugby and Scotland national rugby union team
- Lee Jones, star of The Bastard Executioner
- Lee Jones, director and/or producer of drive-in films like The Hidan of Maukbeiangjow and Supervan
