= Cameron Jones =

Cameron Jones may refer to:

- Cameron Jones (basketball)
- Cameron Jones (swimmer)
- Cameron Jones (cyclist)
- Cameron Jones (cricketer)
- Cameron Jones (rugby union, born 1999)
- Cameron Jones (rugby union, born 2001)
- Cameron Jones (astronaut)

== See also ==
- Cam Jones, American football player
- Kam Jones, American basketball player
