= Keith Jones =

Keith Jones may refer to:

== Sportsmen ==
- Keith Jones (Atlanta Falcons) (born 1966), American former football running back
- Keith "End Zone" Jones (born 1966), American former football running back
- Keith Jones (cricketer, born 1942), former English cricketer
- Keith Jones (cricketer, born 1951), former English cricketer
- Keith Jones (ice hockey) (born 1968), Canadian ice hockey player and executive
- Keith Jones (English footballer) (born 1965), English former footballer
- Keith Jones (Welsh footballer) (1928–2007), Welsh former footballer
- Keith Jones (rugby league) (active 1984–1990), English rugby player

== Others ==
- Keith Jones (surgeon) (1911–2012), Australian medical practitioner and surgeon
- Keith Jones (priest) (born 1944), retired British Anglican priest
- Keith Jones (broadcaster), American news anchor and reporter in Philadelphia, Pennsylvania
- Keith Brymer Jones (born 1965), British potter and ceramic designer
