= Aaron Jones =

Aaron Jones may refer to:

- Aaron Jones (defensive end) (born 1966), American football player
- Aaron Jones (running back) (born 1994), American football player
- Aaron Jones (basketball) (born 1993), American basketball player
- Aaron Jones (cricketer) (born 1994), American and Barbadian cricketer
- Aaron Jones (footballer, born 1881) (1881–1954), English footballer
- Aaron Jones (footballer, born 1994), English footballer
- Aaron Jones (musician), member of Scottish band Old Blind Dogs
