= Marion Jones (disambiguation) =

Marion Jones (born 1975) is an American sprinter, long jumper and basketball player.

Marion Jones may also refer to:

- Marion Jones Farquhar (née Jones, 1879–1965), American tennis player
- Marion Patrick Jones (1934–2016), Trinidadian novelist
- Marion Jones (nurse) (born 1944), New Zealand nursing academic

== See also ==
- Marlon Jones (disambiguation)
