= Cleolinda Jones =

American writer and blogger

- Born: December 14, 1978 (age 47); Birmingham, Alabama, U.S.
- Occupations: Writer, Blogger
- Writing career
- Pen name: Cleolinda Jones
- Genre: Parody
- Notable work: Movies in Fifteen Minutes

Cleolinda "Cleo" Jones (born December 14, 1978) is an American writer and blogger. She is the author of the Movies in Fifteen Minutes series of film parodies, which have a large cult following on the internet. In addition to her published books, she is also known for her commentary on pop culture elements, particularly the growth and development of "fandom" culture for Twilight, Harry Potter, The Hunger Games and Hannibal.

Jones currently lives in Birmingham, where she is a post-graduate student.

== Published works ==
In 2005, Orion Books published Movies in Fifteen Minutes: Hollywood Blockbusters for People Who Can't Be Bothered, a collection of more parodies by Jones. The book has also been published abroad as Cut: Movies in Fifteen Minutes, but has yet to be published in Jones' native United States.

Movies in Fifteen Minutes was praised for being "hilarious – but [also intelligent;] it's the pretensions of James Cameron and Mel Gibson [that Jones] is mocking, not Dickens and Shakespeare".

As a follow-up to Movies in Fifteen Minutes, Jones has also self-published an e-book, The Annotated Movies in Fifteen Minutes: (1) Wizards. It focuses on her humorous recaps of the Harry Potter films, with fandom commentary, interactive links, and historical notes in addition to the recaps.

Jones's recaps of Breaking Dawn, the fourth book in the Twilight series, were heavily referenced in a blog posting in New York Magazine.

Jones's blog was quoted in the MSNBC article "A beginner's guide to Twilight – How to pretend like you know what your teenage daughter is talking about", a commentary written by Dave White.

Her recaps of Season 1 of Hannibal attracted a large following of both fans of the show and entertainment analysts, as Jones often included a meta-analysis of the horror genre elements included in each show for discussion. Her "People in Dracula don't know they're in Dracula" problem analysis was included in The Atlantic feature, "The Formula That's Ruining Teen Movies", in 2013.

In 2014, Jones' work was included in Athena's Daughters, an anthology of science fiction and fantasy stories about women, by women. The project was part of a "Silence in the Library" Kickstarter campaign which later grew to include multiple sequels. Proceeds from the book supported RAINN (Rape, Abuse & Incest National Network), the nation's largest anti-sexual violence organization.
