= Milton Jones (disambiguation) =

Milton Jones (born 1964) is an English comedian.

Milton Jones may also refer to:

- Milton Jones (racing driver) (1894–1932), American racing driver
- Milton Jones (unionist), American labor union leader
