= Humphrey Jones (disambiguation) =

Humphrey Jones (1862–1946) was a Welsh footballer.

Humphrey Jones may also refer to:

- Humphrey Owen Jones (1878–1912), Welsh chemist and mountaineer

== See also ==
- Humphrey Edwardes-Jones (1905–1987), Royal Air Force commander
