= Quincy Jones (disambiguation) =

Quincy Jones (1933–2024) was an American record producer, musician, and entertainment executive.

Quincy Jones may also refer to:

- A. Quincy Jones (1913–1979), architect and Dean of the University of Southern California School of Architecture
- Quincy Jones III (born 1968), musician, son of record producer Quincy Jones
- Quincy Jones (comedian) (born 1984)
