= Rochelle Jones =

American journalist (1945–2006)

Rochelle Peabody Jones (1945–2006) was an American author and journalist, and former press secretary to Congressman Claude Pepper. Jones' books and articles are widely referenced in the Social Science and Policy Analysis fields. Jones wrote for many publications, including the Washington Post, The Nation, The Congressional Quarterly, and was a longtime reporter for People Magazine and contributed articles on health and medicine to CNN.com, WebMD, The New York Daily News, The St. Petersburg Times, and had reporting duties for Knight-Ridder/Tribune syndicated paper The Bradenton Herald. She also taught courses on writing.

== Biography ==
Jones was born in August 1945 and grew up in Fort Lauderdale, Florida. Jones graduated from Duke University in the 1960s and began her career at The Palm Beach Post where she won awards for journalism, one for a series of articles on women in prison. She was awarded a Congressional Fellowship from the American Political Science Association in the early 1970s. Jones served on the board of the Woolly Mammoth Theater Company, in Washington DC.

In the 1970s and early 1980s, she was a legislative aide to Senator Sam Nunn and Senator Lloyd Bentsen. While an aide to Congressman Claude Pepper, Chairman of the House Subcommittee on Health and Long-term Care, in the mid-1980s, Jones developed her expertise in the fields of health, Medicare/Medicaid and geriatric issues.

== Books ==
Jones was the author of:

- The Supermeds: How the Big Business of Medicine is Endangering our Health Care (Scribner - 1988)
- The Big Switch: New Careers, New Lives, After 35 (McGraw-Hill - 1980)
- The Private World of Congress, with co-author Peter Woll (Free Press - 1979)
- The Other Generation: The New Power of Older People (Prentice Hall - 1977)
