= Jacoby Jones (disambiguation) =

Jacoby Jones (1984–2024) was an American football player.

Jacoby Jones may also refer to:

- JaCoby Jones (born 1992), American baseball center fielder
- Jacoby Jones (wide receiver, born 2001)
