= Ruth Jones (disambiguation) =

Ruth Jones (born 1966) is a British actress and writer.

Ruth Jones may also refer to:

== People ==
- Ruth Lee Jones or Dinah Washington (1924–1963), American actress and singer
- Ruth Braswell Jones (1914–2001), American educator
- Ruth Gordon Jones (1896–1985), American actress
- Ruth Jones (basketball) (1946–1986), American college women's basketball coach
- Ruth Jones (politician) (born 1962), Labour MP for Newport West and Islwyn
- Ruth Jones McClendon (1943–2017; born Ruth Elizabeth Jones), American politician
- Ruth Jones Graves Wakefield (1903–1977), inventor of the chocolate chip cookie
- Ruth Martin-Jones (born 1947), British heptathlete

== Fictional characters ==
- Ruth Jones, a character in Rising Damp
- Ruth Gordon Jones, a character in The Actress
