= Eric Jones (rugby league) =

English rugby league footballer

Personal information
- Born: unknown
- Died: unknown

Playing information
Club
Years	Team	Pld	T	G	FG	P
1939–47	Castleford	118	10	0	0	30
1948–49/50	Featherstone Rovers	3	0	0	0	0
	Total	121	10	0	0	30

Eric Jones (birth unknown – death unknown) was a professional rugby league footballer who played in the 1930s, 1940s and 1950s. He played at club level for Castleford, and Featherstone Rovers.

== Playing career ==
Eric Jones made his début for Featherstone Rovers on Saturday 9 October 1948, and he played his last match for Featherstone Rovers during the 1949–50 season.
