= Ralph Jones (disambiguation) =

Ralph Jones (1880–1951) was an American football coach.

Ralph Jones may also refer to:

- Ralph Jones (soldier) (1900–1944), Australian soldier
- Ralph Jones (footballer) (1876–?), Welsh footballer
- Ralph Jones (racing driver) (born 1944), American stock car racing driver
- Ralph Jones (musician) (1921–2000), American drummer
- Ralph Waldo Emerson Jones (1905–1982), president of Grambling State University
- Ralph Jones, main character in King Ralph
- Tiger Jones (Ralph Jones, 1928–1994), American boxer
- Ralph Jones (American football player) (1922–1995), American football player

== See also ==
- Ralf Jones, video game character
