= Emily Jones (disambiguation) =

Topics referred to by the same term

Emily Jones is an American sports announcer.

Emily Jones may also refer to:

- E. B. C. Jones (1893–1966), British novelist.
- Emily Elizabeth Constance Jones (1848–1922), British philosopher.
- Emily Jones (2013–2020), English murder victim.
