= Sidney Jones =

Sidney Jones may refer to:

- Sidney Jones (American football) (born 1996), American football player
- Sidney Jones (cricketer), Australian cricket player
- Sidney Jones (composer) (1861–1946), English musical theatre composer
- Sidney Charles Jones (1902–1944), British Special Operations Executive agent
- Sidney L. Jones (born 1933), American economist
- Sidney Jones, South East Asia programme director of International Crisis Group
- USS Sidney C. Jones, a 19th-century American navy ship

== See also ==
- Sydney Jones (1894–1982), New Zealand politician
- Sydney Jones (businessman) (1872–1947), British shipowner and politician
- Sydney Jones (soccer) (born 2002), American soccer player
