= Ray Jones (footballer, born 1921) =

Australian rules footballer

Personal information
- Full name: Raymond Hassell Jones
- Born: 8 March 1921; South Melbourne, Victoria
- Died: 1 August 2008 (aged 87)
- Original team: South Melbourne Districts
- Height: 168 cm (5 ft 6 in)
- Weight: 68 kg (150 lb)

Playing career^{1}
Years	Club	Games (Goals)
1946	South Melbourne	1 (0)
- ^{1} Playing statistics correct to the end of 1946.

Raymond Hassell Jones (8 March 1921 – 1 August 2008) was an Australian rules footballer who played with South Melbourne in the Victorian Football League (VFL).
