= Lloyd Jones =

Lloyd Jones or Lloyd-Jones may refer to:

== People ==
=== Sports ===
- Lloyd Jones (athlete) (1884–1971), American athlete in the 1908 Summer Olympics
- Lloyd Jones (figure skater) (born 1988), Welsh ice dancer
- Lloyd Jones (English footballer) (born 1995), English footballer
- Lloyd Jones (Australian footballer) (1906–1990), Australian footballer for St Kilda

=== Writers ===
- Lloyd Jones (New Zealand author) (born 1955), New Zealand author
- Lloyd Jones (Welsh writer) (1951–2026), Welsh contemporary novelist
- Lloyd Kenyon Jones, American newspaper journalist, lecturer and author

=== Other ===
- Lloyd Jones (socialist) (1811–1886), socialist, union activist, journalist and writer
- Lloyd Jones (magician) (1906–1984), American magician, pharmacist, book dealer, and publisher
- Lloyd Jones (politician) (born 1937), American politician
- Lloyd E. Jones (1889–1958), U.S. Army general

=== Surname ===
- Antonia Lloyd-Jones (born 1962), British translator of Polish literature
- Charles Lloyd Jones (1878–1958), chairman of David Jones Limited and chairman of the Australian Broadcasting Commission
- David Lloyd-Jones (conductor) (1934–2022), British conductor
- David Lloyd Jones, Lord Lloyd-Jones (born 1952), British Court of Appeal judge
- David Lloyd Jones (architect) (born 1942), British architect
- Edward Lloyd Jones (1844–1894), head of the department store David Jones, or his son
- Edward Lloyd Jones (1874–1934), Shorthorn cattle breeder and chairman of David Jones, or his brother
- Guy Lloyd-Jones (born 1966), British chemist
- Hugh Lloyd-Jones (1922–2009), Oxford scholar
- Jake Lloyd-Jones, Australian television producer
- Jean Hall Lloyd-Jones (born 1929), American politician
- Jenkin Lloyd Jones (1843–1918), American Unitarian minister and father of Richard Lloyd Jones (Tulsa Tribune)
- Jenkin Lloyd Jones Sr. (1911/1912–2004), owner and editor of the Tulsa Tribune, son of Richard Lloyd Jones (Tulsa Tribune)
- Martyn Lloyd-Jones (1899–1981), British evangelical preacher and theologian
- Richard Lloyd-Jones (1933–2025), Permanent secretary to the Welsh Office, Chairman of the Arts Council of Wales
- Richard Lloyd Jones (1873–1963), founder, owner and editor of the Tulsa Tribune
- Robin Lloyd-Jones (1934–2024), British author

== Places ==
- Richard Lloyd Jones Jr. Airport, in Oklahoma

== See also ==
- Lloyd Jones Mills (1917–1942), American naval war hero
- Loyd A. Jones (1884–1954), American scientist who worked for Kodak
