= Colin Jones (model) =

American model and transgender activist

- Born: August 2, 2003 (age 22); Spanish Fork, Utah, U.S.
- Other name: Col the Doll
- Citizenship: American
- Occupation: Model
- Years active: 2021-present
- Known for: Modeling
- Modeling information
- Height: 5 ft 11 in (1.8m)
- Hair color: Blonde
- Eye color: Hazel
- Agency: NIYA Management (Salt Lake City); Women Management (New York, Los Angeles, Milan); Women 360 (Paris); Scoop Models (Copenhagen)

Colin Jones (born August 2, 2003), known professionally as Col the Doll, is an American fashion model and transgender activist. She is noted for her runway work with Gabriela Hearst, Maison Margiela, Ferragamo, and her inclusion in the 2023 Victoria’s Secret World Tour, as well as her advocacy for trans visibility in fashion.

== Early life ==
Jones was born August 2, 2003 and raised in Spanish Fork, Utah, a conservative region largely influenced by Mormon culture. She expressed an early fascination with fashion, inspired by Chanel runway videos viewed on an iPod Touch. Jones embraced her identity as a transgender woman, supported by her family despite local conservatism.

In the summer before her senior year (~2021), Jones submitted modelling photos to a local Utah agency, had a Zoom meeting with NIYA Management, and signed a contract. Shortly after, she relocated to New York City to pursue modeling full-time.

== Career ==
Jones made her runway debut in February 2022 at Gabriela Hearst’s Fall/Winter 2022 show in New York. She has since walked for major fashion houses, including Maison Margiela, Mugler, Ferragamo, Givenchy, Off‑White, Valentino, Nina Ricci, Michael Kors, and Thom Browne.

Jones was featured in the 2023 Victoria’s Secret World Tour, marking a significant milestone in transgender representation. Her editorial work includes appearances in i-D and Pop, and her campaigns include KNWLS and Byredo.

She has been recognized on Models.com, listed in both the "Top 50" and “Hot List,” and nominated for Model of the Year in 2023 and 2024.

== Modelling style and image ==
Known for her chameleon-like style, Jones draws inspiration from vintage aesthetics and Barbie, moving fluidly between feminine and androgynous looks. She speaks openly about fashion as a means of exploring identity.

Her strong social media presence, particularly her TikTok account and Instagram, engages Gen Z audiences and builds her personal brand.

== Personal life and activism ==
Jones is a transgender woman and actively advocates for LGBTQ+ and trans representation in fashion, speaking about her journey from a small-town upbringing. She volunteers for Gay Men’s Health Crisis (GMHC) in New York. Jones has also expressed interest in founding trans healthcare and housing support centers.
