= Ernest Jones (footballer) =

Australian rules footballer

Personal information
- Full name: Ernest Leighton Jones
- Born: 26 November 1871; Carlton, Victoria
- Died: 12 December 1959 (aged 88); Brighton, Victoria

Playing career^{1}
Years	Club	Games (Goals)
1897–98	St Kilda	12 (1)
- ^{1} Playing statistics correct to the end of 1898.

Ernest Leighton Jones (26 November 1871 – 12 December 1959) was an Australian rules footballer who played with St Kilda in the Victorian Football League (VFL).

He later served as president of St Kilda Football Club and as a Melbourne city councillor for over twenty years.
