= Nigel Jones =

Nigel Jones may refer to:

- Nigel Jones, Baron Jones of Cheltenham (1948–2022), British Liberal Democrat politician
- Nigel Jones (cricketer) (born 1982), New Zealand born Irish cricketer
- Nigel Mazlyn Jones (born 1950), English guitarist, singer and songwriter
- Nigel H. Jones (born 1961), British historian, journalist and biographer
