= Abraham Jones (footballer) =

English footballer

Personal information
- Date of birth: 1875
- Place of birth: Tipton, England
- Date of death: 1942 (aged 66–67)
- Position: Centre half

Senior career*
Years	Team	Apps	(Gls)
- Cameron Highlanders
1897–1900	West Bromwich Albion	104	(6)
1901–1905	Middlesbrough	140	(9)
1905–19??	Luton Town		
- * Club domestic league appearances and goals

Abraham Jones (1875–1942) was an English footballer who played in the Football League for Middlesbrough and West Bromwich Albion. His son, another Abraham, also played league football.

Jones was a reserve for England for the 1903–04 British Home Championship match away to Scotland, which England won 1–0, but he was never capped.
