= Mary Alice Jones =

American children's author

- Born: 1898; Dallas, Texas
- Died: 1980 (aged 81–82)
- Education: University of Texas; Northwestern University; Yale University
- Occupation: Writer
- Writing career
- Genre: Children's literature

Mary Alice Jones (1898–1980) was an author of religious books for children.

== Biography ==
Mary Alice Jones was born in Dallas, Texas in 1898. She was involved in religion from an early age, joining the Methodist Church at age 10. She received her initial college education at the University of Texas before attending Northwestern University, earning a master's degree in religious education, and then receiving a Ph.D. from Yale University. She served as the director of children's work for the South Carolina Annual Conference and also for the International Council of Religious Education. She was the first woman teacher at the Yale Divinity School.

She became a children's book editor at Rand McNally & Company in 1945, before transitioning into writing work, authoring such books as Prayers for Little Children, which sold over 2 million copies, and Tell Me About God.

In 1951 she left Rand McNally and became the director of children's work for the General Board of Education of the Methodist Church.

== Bibliography ==
- Tell Me About God (1943)
- Tell me About Jesus (1944)
- Tell Me About the Bible (1945)
- Tell Me About Prayer (1948)
- First Prayers for Little Children (1949)
- Stories of the Christ Child (1953)
- Bible Stories: Old Testament (Elizabeth Webbe illustrator; Chicago: Rand McNally, 1954)
- God Is Good (Elizabeth Webbe illustrator; Chicago: Rand McNally, 1955)
- Prayers and Graces for a Small Child (Elizabeth Webbe illustrator; Chicago: Rand McNally, 1955)
- Tell Me About Heaven (Marjorie Cooper illustrator; Chicago: Rand McNally, 1956)
- Tell Me About Christmas (Marjorie Cooper illustrator; Chicago: Rand McNally, 1958)
- The Baby Jesus (Elizabeth Webbe illustrator; Chicago: Rand McNally, 1961)
- God Loves Me (Elizabeth Webbe illustrator; Chicago: Rand McNally, 1961)
- Tell Me About God's Plan for Me (1965)
- Me, Myself and God (1st Edition 1965 USA & UK) Rand Mcnally.
- Bible Stories for Children (1983)
- The Story of David (Manning de V. Lee illustrator; Chicago: Rand McNally, year unknown)
