= Victor Jones (British Army officer) =

British World War II intelligence officer (born 1898)

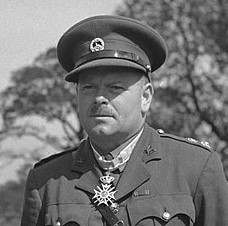
- Jones in 1943
- Born: 7 April 1898; Manila
- Military career
- Allegiance: United Kingdom
- Branch: British Army
- Rank: Colonel
- Service number: 17042
- Units: 14th/20th King's Hussars; Royal Armoured Corps 'A' Force
- Conflicts: Second World War
- Awards: Officer of the Order of the British Empire; Mention in Despatches

Lieutenant Colonel Victor Harry Jones OBE (b. 1898) was a British intelligence officer and "visual deception" expert during the Second World War. First serving with the 14th/20th King's Hussars in the First World War, he made a name for himself during the North African campaign of the Second World War by using dummy tanks (and other fake vehicles) to mislead the enemy. In 1941 he was transferred to A Force in Cairo, under Dudley Clarke, to continue deception operations on a larger scale.

== Biography ==
Jones was born in Manila on 7 April 1898 to Harry Davis Campbell Jones. He and his brother, Jack, attended The Grange school in Crowborough, Sussex. On 11 July 1921, he married Emily Charlotte Thomson in Brompton, London. Amongst their children was the racehorse owner Harry Thomson Jones.

The first military record of Jones is a posting to the 14th/20th King's Hussars. He was listed as 2nd Lieutenant on 16 August 1916 and promoted to Lieutenant on 16 Feb 1918; in June 1936 he was promoted to the rank of major.

During the Second World War Jones initiated several dummy tank operations and became an expert in visual deception techniques. In March or April 1941, Jones joined Dudley Clarke's 'A' Force, the department overseeing strategic deception in the Mediterranean, Middle East and African theatres. Jones was put in charge of visual deception operations, used to confuse the enemy as to the location and strength of Allied forces. During 1941 he oversaw the creation and deployment of three regiments of dummy vehicles, the designs growing steadily more elaborate under the influence of his 'A' Force colleagues and the members of the camouflage section. In August he was promoted to lieutenant colonel. Jones is described as a socialite. He had a wide circle of well-connected friends in Cairo, about whom he would talk at length. The American Colonel William H. Baumer, who met Jones in March 1943, described him as "one of those who spends his every word trying to impress with his acquaintances and lists of names".

Jones briefly commanded 'A' Force from July 1941 after it was placed under the auspices of a new deception department, GSI(d). Clarke was put in overall charge of this endeavour, leaving Jones nominally the head of 'A' Force. However, by September the experiment had failed and the deception departments in Cairo reverted to their previous organisation. By August, 'A' Force was fully operational and running its first major deception. Operation Collect was a cover plan to disguise the real date of Operation Crusader. After seeing Collect started, Clarke left for Lisbon, leaving Jones to manage the operation alongside intelligence commanders Brigadier Shearer and lieutenant colonel Raymund Maunsell. During this period the three collaborated to set up Operation Cheese, the first double agent channel in the Mediterranean.

Prior to 1942, Jones' decoy tank force was somewhat informal, deployed as needed in deceptions. However, for the Battle of Alam el Halfa, at the end of August 1942, the decoys became 4th Armoured Brigade (a recently disbanded formation) and, mixed with real tanks, were given the task of harrying Rommel's flanks. During this time Jones, as commander of the Brigade, was briefly promoted to the rank of Brigadier (a rank which was removed following completion of the El Alamein campaign). In September 1942 Jones was appointed Officer of the Order of the British Empire. On 13 January 1944 he received a Mention in Despatches "in recognition of gallant and distinguished services in the Middle East". Jones retired from the army on 12 August 1948 and was granted the honorary rank of lieutenant colonel.
