= Jones (surname) =

Family name

- Pronunciation: /ˈdʒoʊnz/
- Language: Welsh, English

Origin
- Meaning: "son of John"

Jones is a surname of English and Welsh origin derived from the personal name Jone (a variant of John) and the genitive ending -s. It is particularly common in Wales, where it represents an anglicization of the Welsh patronymic ap Siôn.

The surname is one of the most common in the United States, and is consistently ranked in the top ten. It is also one of the three most common surnames in Wales.

== History ==
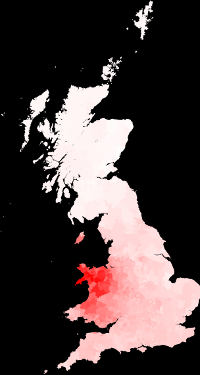
Distribution of the surname Jones in Great Britain and the Isle of Man

The surname Jones first appears on record as a surname in England in 1273 with the name "Matilda Jones". Others put the first known record of the surname Jones as 1279, in Huntingdonshire, England. Around the time of the Laws in Wales Acts in the 16th century, the traditional Welsh system of patronymics was increasingly replaced by the English system of surnames, since English was the official state language and all official documents needed to be in English. This led to patronymics such as ap Dafydd, ap Gwilym, and ap Siôn being anglicized as Davies, Williams, and Jones.

=== 20th and 21st centuries ===
Jones remains the most widespread surname in Wales, borne by around 200,000 people, or 5.75% of the population. In England it is used by around 450,000 people, or 0.75% of the population, but still the second most popular surname, after Smith. The 2000 United States census provides a frequency of 0.50%, providing an overall rank of fifth most frequent with 57.7% White, 37.7% Black, 1.4% Hispanic, 0.9% Native American. Jones was the fourth most common surname in the 1990 U.S. Census, behind only Smith, Johnson and Williams.

== See also ==
- Keeping up with the Joneses
