= Baylor (surname) =

Baylor is a surname. Notable people with the surname include:

- Adelaide Steele Baylor (1860–1935), American educator and school administrator
- B. J. Baylor (born 1998), American football player
- Don Baylor (1949–2017), American baseball player, coach and manager
- Elgin Baylor (1934–2021), American basketball player
- Frances Courtenay Baylor (1848–1920), American author
- George Baylor (1752–1784), American brevet brigadier general during the American Revolutionary War
- George W. Baylor (1832–1916), Texas lawman and Confederate colonel in the American Civil War
- Gracia Baylor (1929–2025), Australian politician
- Hal Baylor, stage name of Hal Fieberling (1918–1998), American actor
- Helen Baylor, stage name of Helen LaRue Lowe (born 1954), American singer-songwriter
- Henry Weidner Baylor (1818–1853), American physician, soldier, and Texas Ranger, namesake of Baylor County, Texas
- John Baylor (American football) (born 1954), American football player
- John R. Baylor (1822–1894), US Indian agent, publisher, editor, and Confederate politician and colonel during the American Civil War
- John Walker Baylor Jr. (c. 1813–1836), Texian pioneer, Army surgeon, and survivor of the Battle of the Alamo, nephew of Robert and Walker
- Robert Emmett Bledsoe Baylor (1793–1874), American politician, judge, namesake and founder of Baylor University, nephew of George
- Tim Baylor (born 1954), American football player
- Walker Keith Baylor (c. 1794–1845), American politician and judge, nephew of George and younger brother of Robert
- William S. Baylor (1831–1862), American lawyer and Confederate colonel in the American Civil War

== See also ==
- Bob Bailor (born 1951), American former Major League Baseball player
