= R. E. B. Baylor =

American politician and judge (1793–1874)

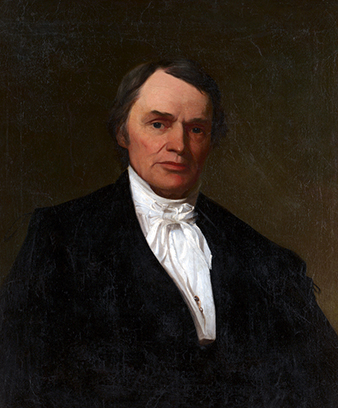
- Portrait by Henry Arthur McArdle

Judge of the Third Judicial District of Texas
- In office April 16, 1846 – October 6, 1863
- Nominated by: J. Pinckney Henderson

Associate Judge of the Third Judicial District of the Supreme Court of the Republic of Texas
- In office January 7, 1841 – January 5, 1846
- Preceded by: John T. Mills
- Succeeded by: Court abolished

Member of the U.S. House of Representatives from Alabama's 2nd district
- In office March 4, 1829 – March 3, 1831
- Preceded by: John McKee
- Succeeded by: Samuel W. Mardis

Member of the Alabama House of Representatives from Tuscaloosa County
- In office November 15, 1824 – December 25, 1824
- Preceded by: James Hill
- Succeeded by: Seth Barton; Marmaduke Williams

Member of the Kentucky House of Representatives from Bourbon County
- In office December 6, 1819 – 1820
- Preceded by: George W. Baylor

Personal details
- Born: May 10, 1793 Lincoln County, Kentucky, U.S.
- Died: December 30, 1873 (aged 80) Gay Hill, Texas, U.S.
- Party: Democratic-Republican; Jacksonian
- Other political affiliations: Whig; Democratic; Know Nothing (1855–1857)
- Relatives: George W. Baylor (brother); Walker Keith Baylor (brother); J. Walker Baylor Jr. (nephew); Henry W. Baylor (nephew); John R. Baylor (nephew); George W. Baylor (nephew); Thomas Chilton (cousin); Will Chilton (cousin)

Military service
- Allegiance: United States; Republic of Texas
- Branch/service: Kentucky Volunteer Militia; Alabama Volunteer Militia; Texas Militia
- Years of service: 1812-1815 (KVM); 1836 (AVM); 1840 (Texas)
- Rank: Lieutenant colonel
- Unit: 10th Regiment, Light Infantry, Kentucky Volunteers; Col. Burleson's Volunteers
- Battles/wars: War of 1812; Siege of Fort Meigs; Battle of the Thames; Creek War of 1836; Texas–Indian Wars; Battle of Plum Creek

Robert Emmett Bledsoe Baylor (May 10, 1793 – December 30, 1873) was an American statesman, jurist, ordained Baptist minister, war veteran, slave owner, and a co-founder and the namesake of Baylor University. According to Thomas R. Phillips and James W. Paulsen, he was one of the most productive justices on the Supreme Court of the Republic of Texas.

== Early life ==
The fifth son and sixth child of twelve children born to Walker and Jane (née Bledsoe) Baylor, Robert Emmett Bledsoe Baylor was born on May 10, 1793, in Lincoln County, Kentucky. Baylor's ancestors had settled in Tiverton, Devon, with origins in Hungary. His uncle, George Baylor, was the first aide-de-camp to General George Washington in the American Revolutionary War and his father and uncle both served in the life guard to Washington in the Continental Army. His uncle was captured in the Baylor Massacre on September 28, 1778, near Tappan, New Jersey, and was later returned in an exchange. His father served in the 3rd Continental Light Dragoons commanded by his brother George, and was disabled by a cannonball that crushed his instep at the Battle of Germantown at the age of 17. His mother was the sister of Jesse Bledsoe, a U.S. Senator from Kentucky.

R. E. B. Baylor attended the local schools around Paris, Kentucky, and was in a large manner self-taught. He was a soldier in the Kentucky militia, seeing action with Colonel William E. Boswell's Regiment during the War of 1812, participating in battles in Ohio against the British, Tecumseh, and Tecumseh's confederacy. He also participated in the ill-fated invasion of Canada, serving under Isaac Shelby and future U.S. president William Henry Harrison. After the war, he studied law under his uncle Jesse Bledsoe and practiced law in Kentucky.

== Political and judicial career ==
=== Origins in Kentucky ===
Baylor was briefly a member of the Kentucky House of Representatives from 1819 to 1820, before he resigned and moved to Alabama. He had offered himself for the Kentucky Legislature in place of his older brother George, who was stepping down. He played the violin or fiddle along with his opponent, Robert P. Letcher, to attract voters, later claiming a narrow victory.

=== Alabama representative ===
After a single term in office in Kentucky, Baylor left and abruptly moved to Alabama. Some have attributed the sudden move to grief. A persistent story says that while he was riding with a young woman he intended to marry, she was bucked off her horse and dragged to her death, with Baylor unable to save her. Finding the familiar scenes of Kentucky too painful to endure, he left for Tuscaloosa, Alabama.

Once there, Baylor began to practice law and later continued his political career. He finished first out of five candidates to represent Tuscaloosa County in the Alabama House of Representatives in 1824. He first ran for Alabama's 2nd congressional district in 1825, losing by 176 votes to John McKee. (Note: John McKee received the most votes on the first ballot and was declared the winner with 4284 votes to Baylor's 4108. John D. Terrill placed third with 2079 votes.) Baylor was elected as a Jacksonian to the Twenty-first Congress (March 4, 1829 – March 3, 1831) from Alabama's 2nd congressional district and was an unsuccessful candidate for election in 1830 to the Twenty-second Congress. In 1836, Baylor was a lieutenant colonel fighting against the Creek tribe in the Creek War of 1836. Shortly after the Battle of San Jacinto, Baylor's nephew, John Walker Baylor Jr., set out to visit his uncles R. E. B. Baylor and Walker Keith Baylor in Mobile, Alabama. While at the home of relatives on furlough from the Texian Army, J. W. Baylor Jr. died from wounds he received that had become infected. Baylor converted and was ordained a Baptist minister in 1839.

=== Career in Texas ===
In 1839, Baylor moved to La Grange, Texas. On February 5, 1840, Mirabeau Lamar, the second president of the Republic of Texas, signed the following Act of Congress:

"Section 1st--Be it enacted by the Senate and House of Representatives of the Republic of Texas, in Congress assembled. That the Secretary of War, be required to issue to R. E. B. Baylor heir of Doctor J. W. Baylor deceased a certificate for 640 acres of land as a donation for participating in the battle of San Jacinto, and a certificate for 640 acres of land allowed to those who died in the service of the country.
"Section 2nd--Be it further enacted. That the commissioner of the General Land Office be required to grant to the said R.E.B. Baylor, heir of Doctor J. W. Baylor deceased a certificate of one third of a league of land, being the headright of Doctor J. W. Baylor deceased, any law to the contrary notwithstanding."

This act secured a large amount of land in Baylor's name as the heir to his nephew and for his nephew's services in the army. He ended up giving it to his nephew's brothers and sisters. In August 1840, Baylor was a participant of the Battle of Plum Creek, serving under Edward Burleson along with two other Baptist ministers, Z. N. Morrell and Thomas Washington Cox. He quickly made a name for himself in Texas law as judge of the Third Judicial District of the Congress of the Republic of Texas, and was appointed to the Supreme Court of the Republic of Texas as an associate justice in 1841, a position he would hold until the annexation of Texas in 1845.

Baylor became the first president of the Texas Baptist Educational Society upon its inception in 1841, and in 1844, along with Rev. William M. Tryon and Rev. James Huckins, sent a petition to the Congress of the Republic of Texas asking the nation to charter a Baptist university. In response to this petition, The Republic of Texas produced an Act of Congress that was signed on February 1, 1845, by Anson Jones, providing the charter that yielded Baylor University and, later, the University of Mary Hardin-Baylor. Baylor presided over the meeting that named Henry Lee Graves as the first president of Baylor University. The Texas Temperance Society elected Baylor as its first president in 1845. He was one of two delegates, along with James S. Mayfield, elected to represent Fayette County at the Texas Constitutional Convention of 1845. At the convention he advocated for homestead protection, the forbiddance of ministers from legislative service, a system of judicial appointment and fought strongly against judicial elections. On April 16, 1846, Baylor was appointed to a six-year term as judge of the state's Third Judicial District. He was confirmed by the senate without a dissenting vote, although senator Jesse Grimes tried to lay the nomination on the table and did not vote in the confirmation. Baylor, later the same year, entered the running in the first election for the state's 2nd congressional district, finishing last out of four candidates, with the seat won by Timothy Pilsbury. Initially successful in his effort against judicial elections, the greatest change in his career occurred in 1850 when, by constitutional amendment, the appointment system was replaced in favor of popular judicial elections. He held the judicial position until his retirement in 1863.

== Later life and legacy ==
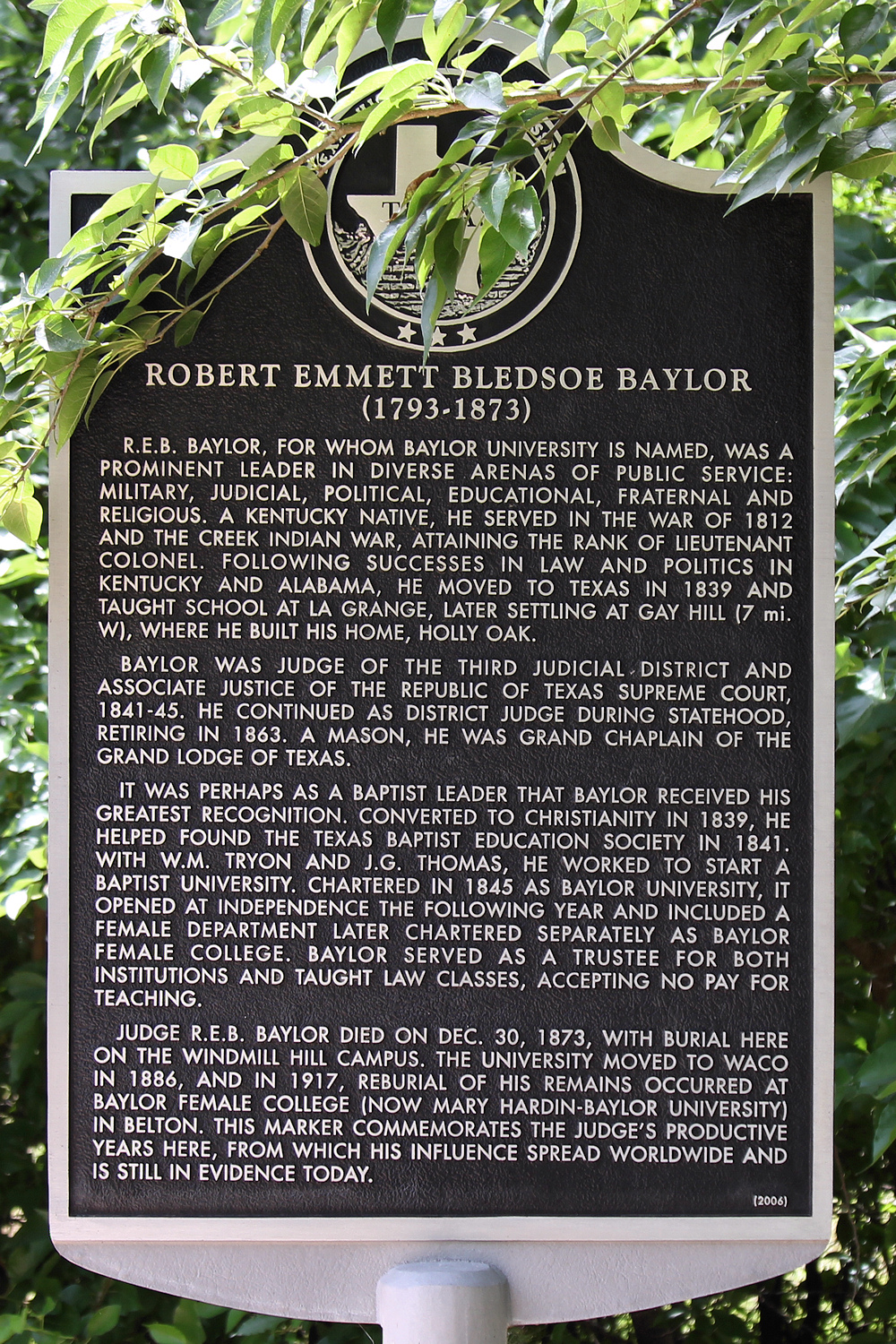
A historical marker commemorating Baylor at Baylor University's original campus in Independence, Texas.

R. E. B. Baylor was named to the inaugural faculty of the Baylor Law School for its opening in 1857. His judicial duties did not permit him to present regular lectures. In the 1860 census, he was one of the wealthiest residents in Washington County, Texas. Eugene W. Baker, the longtime historian of Baylor University wrote in his biography of Baylor, In His Traces: The Life and Times of R. E. B. Baylor, that he left his farm chores to be the interim president of Baylor University in May 1867. However, Baylor University has also stated he never was president of the university. He was the president of the Baylor Female College Board of Trustees.

After his retirement from the legal profession in 1863 he lived the remainder of his life in Gay Hill, Texas, where he built his home, Holly Oak.

During the Civil War, Baylor supported the Confederacy and the grounds of Baylor University, then in Independence, were used as a training and staging ground for the Confederate Army. A nephew of Baylor, John R. Baylor, was a prominent leader in the Confederacy serving as both a governor and later as a member of the Confederate Congress.

=== Death ===
He died on December 30, 1873, and was buried in Independence, Texas, on the original site of Baylor University. In 1917, his remains were exhumed and transferred to the University of Mary Hardin-Baylor in Belton, Texas. After the original Baylor had closed, the residents of Independence's hostility toward the new Baylor University in Waco was too great to permit reburial there, so eventually Judge Baylor was re-interred in the main building at University of Mary Hardin-Baylor in Belton. A fire destroyed the building and ruined his gravesite in 1964. His remains were moved to a small historical park on the campus. A monument was erected in 1966, bearing the single word "Baylor."

=== Legacy ===
Baylor is memorialized on the Waco campus by a seated bronze statue unveiled for the 94th anniversary of the university's founding on February 1, 1939, sculpted by Pompeo Coppini and funded by the Texas Centennial Commission. Coppini had been selected over Leonard Crunelle's marble sculpture design proposal. George W. Truett delivered the main address at the unveiling, and one of Judge Baylor's former slaves, Ann Freeman, was presented on stage and applauded by the approximately 3000 attendees. Many of Baylor's documents are located at Baylor University, some of his court records are in McLennan County, and at least two volumes of his legal documents are located at the Brazos County Courthouse.

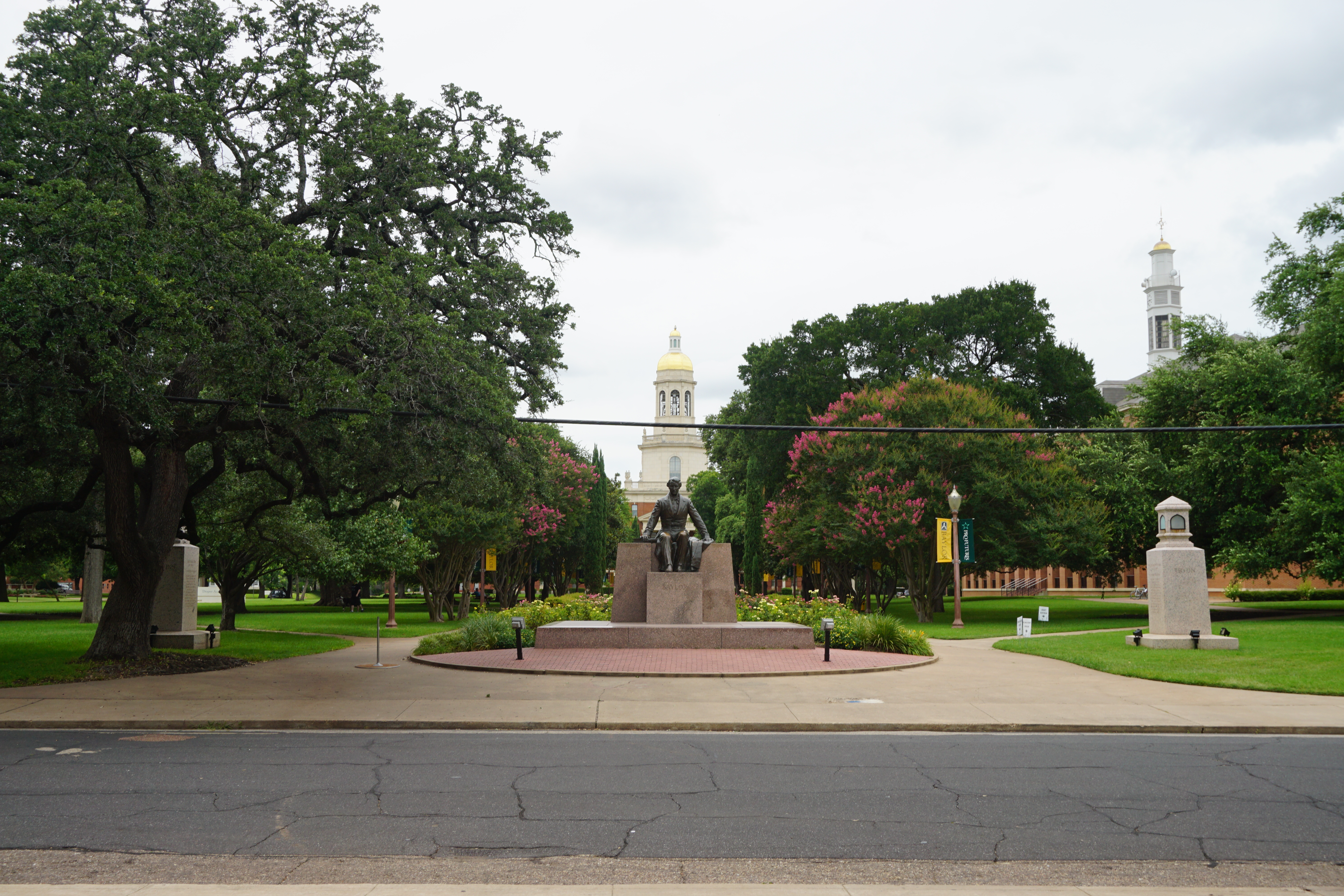
Baylor's statue at Baylor University in Waco.

== Political, social, and religious views ==
Initially a supporter of Andrew Jackson when elected to Congress, Baylor would later change his views on the president. In the mid-1850s, Baylor was an influential leader in the Nativist Texas Know Nothing Party and was named the party's "Grand President" at a secret convention in Washington-on-the-Brazos on June 11, 1855.

=== Slavery ===
R. E. B. Baylor owned slaves while living in Texas, predominately women. A report commissioned by Baylor University found that in 1860 enslaved persons formed a significant portion of his wealth; the 1860 census records him as owning 33 slaves. In his role as a judge, he once punished an abolitionist harboring an escaped slave. Another man was punished for not returning a borrowed slave promptly. In 1854, Judge Baylor sentenced a slave to hang for arson. In 1856, he ordered the execution of yet another slave. In 1857, he levied a heavy fine on a white person who bought some bacon from a slave. And in 1862, as the Civil War raged, he ordered the execution of a slave for "intent to rape a white female."

=== Religious views ===
Before 1839, Baylor had always been a skeptic. He had personally identified first as a Deist and then a Unitarian. He converted and became a Baptist in 1839. During the deliberations of the 1845 state constitution, Baylor famously said, "I do think that any office coming directly from the people ought ever to be filled by the clergy of any denomination." He pointed out that Louisiana and other states had adopted similar measures that prohibited the clergy from public office, and that it should remain as it was "calculated to keep clear and well defined the distinction between Church and State, so essentially necessary to human liberty and happiness". Francis W. Moore Jr., of Harris County, who took the position that "no man or set of men should be disenfranchised", pointed out the irony that Baylor himself was a minister of the gospel who had been directly elected by voters to be a delegate to the convention.

== Personal life ==
Baylor was a Mason from 1825 until his death. He never married and had no children, although he was close to his nephew John R. Baylor, who lived with him for a time. An 1899 genealogy of the Baylor family erroneously lists R. E. B. Baylor as the father of John R. Baylor.

== Notes ==
Legal offices
Preceded by District established	Judge of the Third Judicial District of Texas; 1846 – 1863	Succeeded by Unknown
Preceded by John T. Mills	Associate Judge of the Third Judicial District of the Supreme Court of the Republic of Texas; 1841 – 1846	Succeeded by Court abolished
Political offices
U.S. House of Representatives
Preceded by John McKee	Member of the U.S. House of Representatives from Alabama's 2nd congressional district March 4, 1829 – March 3, 1831	Succeeded by Samuel Wright Mardis
Alabama House of Representatives
Preceded by James Hill	Member of the Alabama House of Representatives from Tuscaloosa County; 1824	Succeeded by Seth Barton; Marmaduke Williams
Kentucky House of Representatives
Preceded by George W. Baylor	Member of the Kentucky House of Representatives; 1819 – 1820	Succeeded by Unknown
