= Baylor =

Baylor may refer to:

== American schools ==
- Baylor University, Waco, Texas
  - Baylor Bears, the sports teams of Baylor University
- Baylor College of Medicine, Houston, Texas
- Texas A&M University Baylor College of Dentistry, Dallas, Texas (Baylor name deleted in 2016)
- Baylor College of Medicine Academy at Ryan, a middle school in Houston, Texas
- Baylor School, a private prep school in Chattanooga, Tennessee

== Places in the United States ==
- Baylor, West Virginia, an unincorporated community
- Baylor County, Texas, named for Henry Weidner Baylor
- Baylor Creek Reservoir, a lake in Texas

== People ==
- Baylor (surname), a list of people
- Baylor Cupp (born 2000), American football player
- Baylor Scheierman (born 2000), American basketball player
