= Walker Keith Baylor =

American judge and politician (1794–1845)

Member of the Alabama Senate
- In office November 1, 1841 – February 15, 1843
- Preceded by: C. C. P. Farrar
- Succeeded by: Moses F. Kelly Jr.
- Constituency: Jefferson County and St. Clair County
- In office December 3, 1838 – February 2, 1839
- Preceded by: Harrison W. Goyne
- Succeeded by: District restructured
- Constituency: Jefferson County and Walker County

Member of the Alabama House of Representatives from Jefferson County
- In office November 21, 1825 – January 14, 1826 Serving with John Brown and John M. Dupuy
- Preceded by: Thomas W. Farrar; Benjamin Worthington
- Succeeded by: John Martin

Personal details
- Born: c. 1794 Bourbon County, Kentucky, U.S.
- Died: 1845 (aged 50–52) La Grange, Republic of Texas
- Cause of death: Gunshot wound
- Resting place: William Miller Baylor's Farm, near La Grange, Texas, U.S. (Note: He was buried about seven miles south of LaGrange near the Colorado River at his brother William Miller Baylor's farm.)
- Party: Democratic
- Relatives: R. E. B. Baylor (brother); J. Walker Baylor Jr. (nephew); Henry W. Baylor (nephew); John R. Baylor (nephew); George W. Baylor (nephew); Thomas Chilton (cousin); Will Chilton (cousin)

Walker Keith Baylor (c. 1794–1845) was an American jurist and attorney. He was a politician who served in both chambers of the Alabama Legislature, a county judge of Jefferson County, and judge of the Third Judicial Circuit Court of Alabama.

While visiting his brother in the Republic of Texas, he was killed in an accident involving a firearm in La Grange.

== Early life ==
The sixth son and seventh child of twelve children born to Walker and Jane (née Bledsoe) Baylor, Walker Keith Baylor was born in Bourbon County, Kentucky. His father Walker Baylor joined the Continental Army as the rank of cornet and was later promoted to major in the Revolutionary War. He became disabled after a cannonball crushed the instep of his foot at the Battle of Germantown, where he served in the life guard to George Washington at the age of 17. George Baylor, the first aide-de-camp to George Washington at Trenton, was Walker Keith's uncle. His mother, Jane Bledsoe, was the sister of U.S. Senator Jesse Bledsoe of Kentucky. He became a lawyer and moved to Alabama around the same time as his older brother R. E. B. Baylor in 1820. After moving, he opened a law office in Elyton, Alabama.

== Career ==
He was elected to the Alabama House of Representatives in 1825. He represented Jefferson County along with John Brown and John M. Dupuy. As a representative of Jefferson County, he presented a petition to establish a permanent seat of justice in Walker County. He voted in favor of James C. Neill's bill "to more effectually prevent Sabbath breaking", which lost. He voted against William C. Watson's bill entitled "an act to suppress immorality". He also voted against James Dellet's offered amendment to the bill.

And be it further enacted, that any person who shall be guilty of endeavoring to procure votes in any manner whatever, shall be subject to an indictment, and on conviction thereof shall receive thirty nine lashes on his bare back at the public whipping post of the county, and shall not thereafter be a competent witness in any court of law or equity in this state.

He served as a judge of the county court, now known as the probate court, of Jefferson County for several years. In 1834, Baylor issued a penal bond to John Cantley and Harrison W. Goyne, who he later succeeded in the Alabama Senate, to the amount of $361 and executed a chattel mortgage.

Baylor represented Jefferson County at the Railroad Convention of the State of Alabama in November 1835. Henry W. Collier, the president of the convention, appointed Baylor to a committee to discern the "practicability and expediency" of railroad construction as was demanded by the people.

Shortly after the Battle of San Jacinto, Baylor's nephew, John Walker Baylor Jr., set out to visit his uncles R. E. B. Baylor and Walker Keith Baylor in Mobile, Alabama. While at the home of relatives on furlough from the Texian Army, J. W. Baylor Jr. died from wounds he received that had become infected.

In 1838, he was a member of the Alabama Senate, from the Jefferson County and Walker County district.

Walker Keith Baylor moved to Texas with his brother R. E. B. Baylor in 1839.

He was again re-elected to the Alabama Senate and took his seat in 1841, serving through the session of 1842. He was the chairman of the educational committee in the senate. On February 14, 1843, he was elected as one of the two Trustees for the University of the State of Alabama, from the third Judicial District, receiving the second-most votes, 63, after Benjamin F. Porter's 94.

He was appointed by Governor Benjamin Fitzpatrick to the Third Judicial Circuit Court to succeed Peter Martin of Tuskaloosa in 1843. He was elected to the position by the legislature soon after in the following legislative session. Two catalogues of the University of the State of Alabama from 1844 and 1845 mention his term was expected to expire in 1847. He was also on the Executive Committee of the University of Alabama. Baylor was holding this office when his death occurred in 1845.

== Death ==
A letter from his brother R. E. B. Baylor, who wrote from Austin, the capital of the Republic of Texas, on July 30, 1845, to their cousin Thomas Chilton in Perry County, Alabama, announcing the death of Walker K. Baylor was published in several newspapers. He was killed at La Grange.

By the time this reaches you, you will have heard of the melancholy fate of my brother, Walker K. Baylor, His death was sudden and unexpected. A Mr. Rivers, late of the State of Tennessee, having a revolving pistol in his hand, the hammer slipped through his fingers, causing the pistol to fire, and shooting my brother immediately through the heart. He died instantly. A nephew standing by exclaimed, "You have killed my uncle!"—Poor Walker replied, "Oh no!"—and never spoke again. Mr. Rivers, I learn, suffered greatly from agony of mind, and expressed the deepest sorrow on account of his being the cause of this fatal occurrence.

Willis Brewer's Alabama: Her History, Resources, War Record, and Public Men from 1540 to 1872, William Garrett's Reminiscences of Public Men in Alabama, and Thomas McAdory Owen's History of Alabama and Dictionary of Alabama Biography, all recorded that his death was caused by the accidental firing of a firearm. Garrett and Owen wrote that the firearm was a newly invented pistol. John Witherspoon Du Bose wrote that it was a new Colt revolver, a rare weapon for the time. He mentions it was accidentally discharged while Baylor was showing his brother and other friends.

A genealogy of the Baylor family written in 1899 recites Walker Keith Baylor as having been "killed by an accidental discharge of his gun in 1845".

His nephew George Wythe Baylor wrote to Orval Walker Baylor in about 1913 that Walker Keith Baylor was killed by Jones Rivers. In Orval Walker Baylor and Henry Bedinger Baylor's Baylor's History of the Baylors, written in 1914, it mentions that he was accidentally killed by Colonel Jones Rivers at La Grange, Texas, in 1848.

He was buried on the farm belonging to his older brother William Miller Baylor.

== Personal life ==
He was never married and had no children. Du Bose wrote that before he left Kentucky, Baylor "parted from a pure, sweet girl, who was soon to become his wife." However, upon returning to Kentucky he discovered she was dead. Brewer mentions that between his terms in the legislature, "he showed a preference for professional and literary rather than political life". Greatly interested in philosophy and astronomy, he often visited the Old University of Alabama Observatory, where he studied the planetary system with Professor Frederick A. P. Barnard.

He spent many evenings and nights examining the planetary system with Professor Barnard, aided with improved instruments that were ordered from London. He was considered to be somewhat eccentric, and had a strong belief in the doctrines of phrenology and physiognomy. His convictions were often acted upon by measuring the face and head of candidates seeking office with a tape line to determine their fitness. Du Bose wrote that Baylor was highly educated, not regarded as a particularly great lawyer, and was not studious. William Garret noted in his reminiscence of Baylor:

To a practised observer of men, and to one well acquainted with the influences on character, there would be no difficulty in deciding that the high gifts of nature in the external man, had suffered in their full development by an excess of wine or other stimulant not essential to physical or mental beauty. He was a rare compound of worth and infirmity and while his melancholy fate excited general sympathy and regret, his character for integrity will ever survive in the memory of those who knew him best. [sic]

== Notes ==
Legal offices
Preceded by Peter Martin	Judge of the Third Judicial Circuit Court of Alabama; 1843–1845	Succeeded by Lincoln Clark
Preceded by John "Red" Brown	Presiding County Judge of Jefferson County, Alabama	Succeeded by John F. Forrest
Political offices
Alabama Senate
Preceded by Charles Cotesworth Pinckney Farrar	Member of the Alabama Senate from Jefferson County and St. Clair County; 1841-1843	Succeeded by Moses Frederick Kelly Jr.
Preceded by Harrison W. Goyne	Member of the Alabama Senate from Jefferson County and Walker County; 1838–1839	Succeeded by District Restructured
Alabama House of Representatives
Preceded by Thomas W. Farrar; Benjamin Worthington	Member of the Alabama House of Representatives from Jefferson County (Elyton); 1825–1826	Succeeded by John Martin
