= Frank Jones =

Frank Jones may refer to:

- Frank Jones (politician) (1832–1902), U.S. representative
- Frank Jones (Texas Ranger) (1856–1893), Texas Ranger captain, frontier lawman
- Frank Jones (baseball) (1858–1936), baseball player
- Frank Jones (priest) (1861–1935), Anglican archdeacon of Barnstaple
- Frank Jones (American football tackle) (fl. 1904–1905), college football player
- Frank Jones (American football coach) (1918–2009), American football coach
- Frank Jones (footballer) (born 1960), Welsh former footballer
- Frank Jones Jr. (born 1948), American luger
- Adi Da (Franklin Albert Jones, 1939–2008), American spiritual teacher
- Frank Fernando Jones (1855–1941), American politician, businessman, and murder suspect
- Frank Lancaster Jones (born 1937), Australian sociologist
- Frank Leith Jones (born 1951), American academic, public servant and military historian
- Frank M. Jones (1847–1922), American merchant and politician from New York
- Frank Melville Jones (1866–1941), Anglican colonial bishop
- Frank Jones (cyclist) (1907–1987), Welsh cyclist

== See also ==
- Francis Jones (disambiguation)
- Franklin Jones (disambiguation)
