= William M. Tryon =

American Baptist minister and Baylor University co-founder

Reverend William Milton Tryon (March 10, 1809 – November 16, 1847) was an American missionary, pastor, Baptist minister, and co-founder of Baylor University. With some leading Baptist missionaries, Rev. James Huckins and Judge Robert Emmett Bledsoe Baylor, he inspired the formation of Christian education in Texas.

== Background ==
At age 9, Tryon lost his father, and was 17 years old when he was baptized. With his mother, he moved to Georgia in 1823 and was given a license to preach. He was a graduate of Mercer Institute, and in 1836, he was ordained as a minister; he was a preacher in Alabama and led five churches. Tryon, with Robert E. B. Baylor, suggested the formation of the Baptist Education Society in Texas and the Baptist College of Florida. He was chaplain of the Texas Senate in 1843. He became the first president of the board of trustees at Baylor University.

== Baylor University establishment ==
Tryon first suggested the establishment of Baylor University in Texas in 1841. The district lawyer, Judge R. E. B. Baylor, began promoting the idea and was supported by members of the Texas Baptist Education Society, which was affiliated with the Union Baptist Association. The full-time fundraiser, Rev. James Huckins, was the first missionary to Texas.

Tryon spent seven years as a leading Baptist in Texas. He dreamed that Baylor University would be a Christian institution.

He later became the second pastor of First Baptist Church in Houston, and later he became the first resident missionary. He helped raise many churches and land in Texas. Tryon died of fever.
