= John Baylor =

John Baylor is the name of:

- John W. Baylor, Jr. (c. 1813–1836), Texian pioneer and survivor of the Battle of the Alamo
- John R. Baylor (1822–1894), US Indian agent, publisher, editor, and Confederate politician and colonel during the American Civil War, brother of the above.
- John Baylor (American football) (born 1965), American retired National Football League player
