= George Bush Stevenson =

American politician (1830–1897)

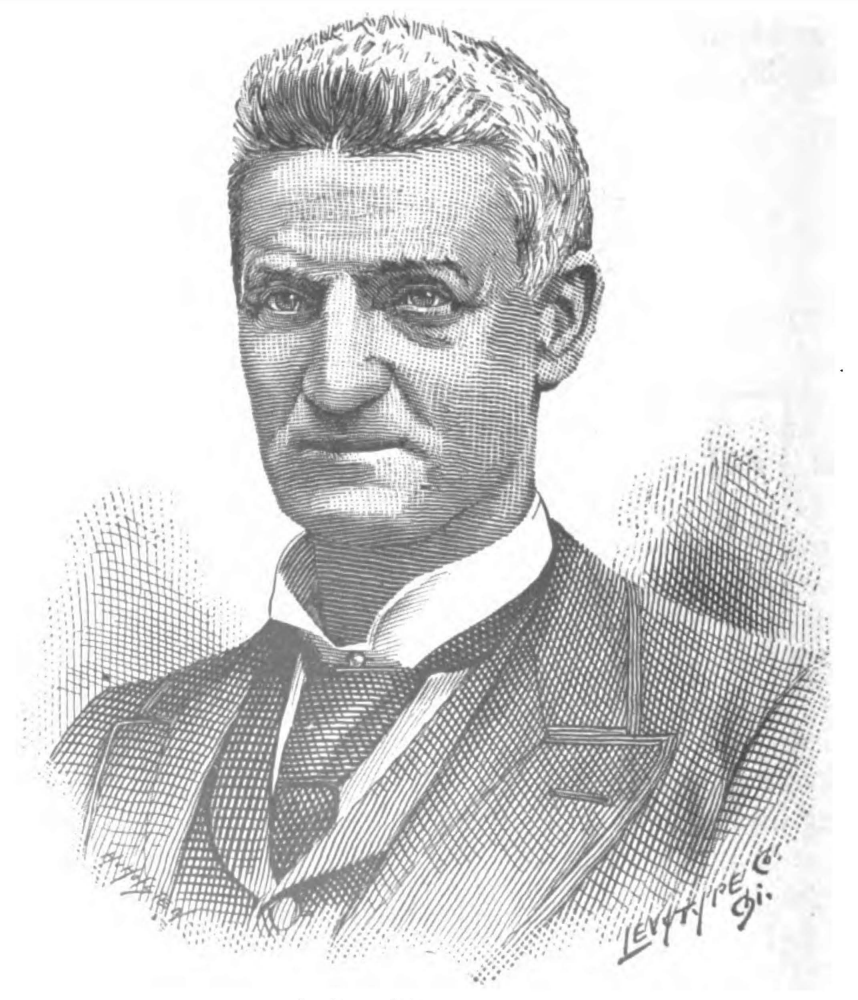
- G. B. Stevenson

Member of the Texas House of Representatives from the 80th district
- In office January 8, 1889 – January 13, 1891
- Preceded by: George W. Baylor
- Succeeded by: Andrew J. Baker

Personal details
- Party: Democratic

George Bush Stevenson (August 10, 1830 – June 23, 1897), originally of Woodford County, Kentucky, was a successful farmer and businessman in California and, after 1881, in Texas. He was an elected representative of the Texas State Government, representing El Paso from 1889 to 1891.

== Origins ==
George Bush Stevenson was born on August 10, 1830, 3 miles (4.8 km) from Versailles, Woodford County, Kentucky, in a two-story double farm house and homestead, constructed of red brick, which was located in the Pisgah neighborhood on the pike leading from Versailles to Lexington, Kentucky. He was educated at the old Pisgah school house, under the tutelage of "Dominie McDermont", and other classical scholars.

== Gold rush ==
He was the son of William and Jane M. Stevenson, prosperous farmer and blooded stock raiser of Woodford County, but about the time that his schoolmates were packing up to go off to college to complete a regular curriculum, gold was discovered in California, and Stevenson caught the fever. A company of young men met at Midway and organized a company to cross the plains, to California. Then it was a long four or six months trip, by mule or ox teams, over a hostile country, marked by pillaging and roving bands of different American Indian tribes, and it required determination and intrepidity to risk the trip. Young Stevenson induced his parents to permit him to join this company.

In the spring of 1849, when he was just nineteen years of age, he, with his comrades took a steamboat at Louisville to St. Louis, Missouri, and from there another to St. Joseph, on the Upper Missouri, a small town then on the border of the settlements. At St. Joseph the company purchased mules, having brought their wagons from Kentucky, laid in provisions, and about May 7, 1849, crossed the Missouri river and started on their long and difficult journey. (Note: Fremont and Bryant have given accounts of this long route from the Missouri to the Sacramento river.) Stevenson and his companions arrived in California simultaneously with the large emigration of 1849. For the first year of his residence in California he engaged in successful mining.

== Business ==
In 1850, having accumulated some money, he settled in the Suisun Valley, Salano County, and engaged in farming and stockraising, in which he was also successful, but the State needed more stock. In 1853 Stevenson purchased a large flock of sheep about Jacksonville, Illinois, and hiring sufficient help he drove them across the plains to his valley farm in California. Again, in 1854, he returned to the east and purchased a large drove of cattle, driving these also across the plains to his ranch, making the third trip that he made across the plains before any houses had been built west of the Missouri river or Kansas, all the way to the Sierra Nevada mountains, the Pacific coast range.

Stevenson was an energetic and adventurous man, stood about 6 feet (1.8 m) tall, slim and straight, and was very successful in accumulating about him a considerable fortune. In addition to his occupations of stockraising, farming and merchandizing, Stevenson, in connection with his brother, A. M. Stevenson, built and ran as its general manager a branch railroad in California, in 1869—the Vaca Valley and Clear Lake railroad—in which he largely invested and was employed until 1881.

== Texas ==
He resided in Salona County until he removed to Texas in 1881, and settled in Yselta, El Paso County, Texas, and engaged in farming and mining. The mine, of which he and several of his sons were the main owners, was a lead mine called the "Bonanza", and was located in the Quitman Mountains. A report of the State Geologist in the 1880s said of the Bonanza:

The lead runs east and west, dips nearly vertically in a contact between granite and porphory. A shaft 95 feet [20 m] is sunk to a drift running east and west about 350 feet [107 m]. From this drift a winz is sunk 100 feet [30 m] deep, holds 9 feet [3 m] of water, supplying men and animals—a fine suite for the construction of a dam, just below the shaft opening of the Bonanza, 485 feet above sea level.

=== Politics ===
Colonel Stevenson was a member of the Twenty-first session of the House of Representatives of the Texas Legislature from the 80th district, and was a member of certain important committees. He received 5499 votes out of 5540 of all the votes of the district, receiving the entire votes of his district, except forty-one. Virtually he received the unanimous vote of his district.

== Personal life ==
In 1856, Stevenson married Annie Maupin, daughter of Thomas Maupin, of Boone County, Missouri. They had six sons:

1. Charles A. Stevenson;
2. William Stevenson;
3. Andrew Stevenson;
4. George Stevenson;
5. Herbert Stevenson;
6. Fred Stevenson.

== See also ==
- Twenty-first Texas Legislature

== Sources ==
- Daniell, L. E. (1889). "George Bush Stevenson" (PDF). Personnel of the Texas State Government, with Sketches of Distinguished Texans. Austin, TX: Smith, Hicks & and Jones, State Printers. pp. 296–301.
- "George Bush Stevenson". Legislative Reference Library of Texas. Retrieved April 29, 2023.
