= Franklin Jones =

Franklin Jones may refer to:

- Franklin D. Jones (1879–1967), mechanical engineering author
- Adi Da (Franklin Albert Jones, 1939–2008), founder of Adidam

== See also ==
- Frank Jones (disambiguation)
