= James B. Gillett =

Texas Ranger

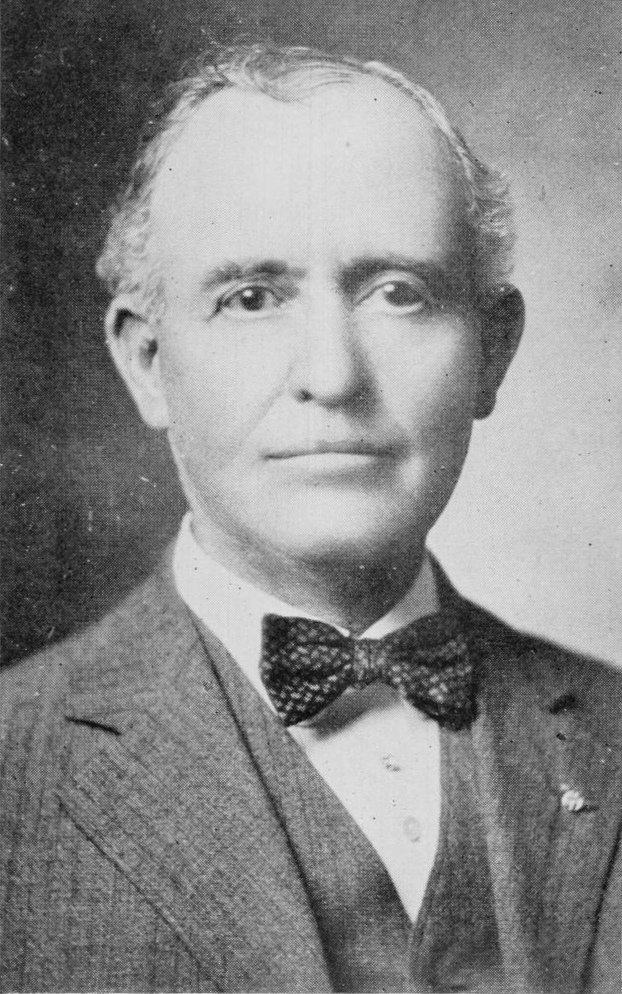
James B. Gillett in 1921

James Buchanan Gillett (November 4, 1856 – June 11, 1937) was a lawman of the Old West, mostly known for his service as a Texas Ranger. He is a member of the Texas Rangers Hall of Fame.

== Early life ==
He was born in Austin, Texas. Gillett grew up working as a cowboy on local ranches.

== Career ==
He joined the Texas Rangers in 1875, in Menard. Gillett initially served under Captain D. W. Roberts with "Company D", and later with Captain N. O. Reynolds and Captain G. W. Baylor. Baylor's daughter Helen later became his wife. Mostly assigned to the west Texas border regions, Gillett fought in numerous skirmishes with Kiowa, Apache, and Comanche Indians. He was involved in the July 21, 1878, killing of outlaw Sam Bass in Round Rock, Texas, when Bass was shot by Texas Ranger George Herold. Gillett later took part in settling the Mason County War and the Horrell-Higgins feud.

Gillett's fights with Indians and several other outlaws made him a legend. While under the command of Captain Baylor in January 1881, Gillett's company pursued a hostile band of Apache who had attacked a stagecoach. The Rangers surprised the band, killing six and scattering the rest. He pursued outlaw Dick Dublin that year, killing him in a gunfight.

=== Capture of the Baca brothers, resignation ===
On New Year's Eve, 1881, Gillett's friend, A. M. Conklin, was murdered in El Paso by the Baca brothers, after Conkiln was involved in a fight with Onefre Baca. Gillett and fellow Ranger George Lloyd set out in pursuit immediately after the killing. Tracking the brothers to their uncle's home, Gillett made it known they were there to bring the brothers in. The Uncle, Jose Baca, was a local Judge, and offered Gillett a $1,000 bribe to go away, which Gillett refused. Gillett and Lloyd captured the brothers at Jose Baca's house, with the exception of Onefre Baca.

Onefre Baca had fled to Mexico. Upon learning this, but without authorization to enter Mexico, Gillett crossed the border illegally. He arrested Onefre Baca and took him to Socorro, Texas to be held until he could be taken back to El Paso. Shortly afterward, Baca was lynched by an angry mob. After only six years service, Gillett resigned from the Rangers with the rank of sergeant. He was accused of illegally arresting Baca and under pressure from Texas Governor Oran M. Roberts.

He took a position as Deputy Marshal for El Paso, Texas, in June, 1882, working briefly under Dallas Stoudenmire. Gillett held the position as marshal until 1885. He accepted a job managing the Estado Land and Cattle Company, staying for six years. He started his own ranch after that, in Alpine, Texas, then moved with his family to Roswell, New Mexico in 1907. Purchasing the Barrell Spring Ranch, Gillett then began raising a premium herd of Hereford cattle. Gillett retired from ranching in 1923, leasing his ranch to his son Milton, and moved to Marfa, Texas. In 1921, Gillett published his memoirs, Six years with the Texas Rangers, which has remained in print since. He died of heart failure on June 11, 1937, and is buried in the Marfa cemetery.

In his book The Captured: A True Story of Abduction by Indians on the Texas Frontier (St. Martin's Press, 2004, pgs.211-212) Scott Zesch records an incident in which Gillett, along with ranger Ed Seiker, fought a running battle with a band of Apaches during which the two nearly killed a 'white Indian' named Herman Lehmann. Lehmann had been captured and adopted by the Apache and had become a warrior. They also killed and mutilated a warrior named Nusticeno whom they "butchered terribly": "In their zeal, the novice rangers had shot the Apache countless times, carved the skin off him, and even decapitated him." They took his bow, quiver, shield, and moccasins as trophies.

Police appointments
Preceded by Dallas Stoudenmire	City Marshal of El Paso, Texas; May 27, 1882–March 24, 1885	Succeeded by Thomas B. White
