= Elyton, Alabama =

Coordinates: 33.5014°N 86.8407°W

Historical population
Census	Pop.	Note	%±
1880	700		—

Elyton (Ely's Town), Alabama, was the county seat of Jefferson County, Alabama from 1821 to 1873. It was the county's second seat, after Carrollsville (1819-1821) (now the Birmingham neighborhood of Powderly). In 1873 the courthouse was moved to Birmingham. The area that was Elyton is currently bordered by 7th Street Southwest and Cotton Avenue in the West End of Birmingham.

Elyton was incorporated as a town December 20, 1820. It was created to be the county seat with a 160-acre (0.65 km^{2}) grant negotiated by federal land agent William Ely, of Connecticut. The new town was named in his honor. The site was previously called Frog Level, and was known primarily as a sporting grounds for horse races.

In 1821 Elyton had 300 residents, and grew to over 1,000 by 1873. Elyton was listed on the 1880 U.S. Census as having a population of 700. During this time Elyton was an important community in middle Alabama. It was the residence of U.S. Representative Thomas Haughey (1868–69) and the headquarters of the Elyton Presbytery (formed in 1832).

In 1853 merchant John Cantley established the Elyton Herald after purchasing the Washington hand press and type from Moses Lancaster after his newspaper, the Central Alabamian, ceased publication. After many ownerships, mergers and name changes the paper became the Birmingham Post-Herald in 1950.

The community was incorporated as a municipality in 1907, but was annexed into Birmingham as part of the Greater Birmingham legislation which took effect on January 1, 1910. Frank W. Smith was the first and only mayor of Elyton. The Board of Aldermen was composed of Ollis Brown, Van Smith, C. M. Bitz, T. T. Alley, and W. M. Marriner. The name Elyton is still used to refer to this area of Birmingham.

== Notable people ==
- Walker Keith Baylor (1796–1845), attorney, judge, and politician, had a law office and resided in Elyton
- Morgan C. Hamilton (1809-1893), U.S. Senator, businessman, engaged in mercantile pursuits in Elyton
