= George Baylor =

Continental Army officer (1752–1784)

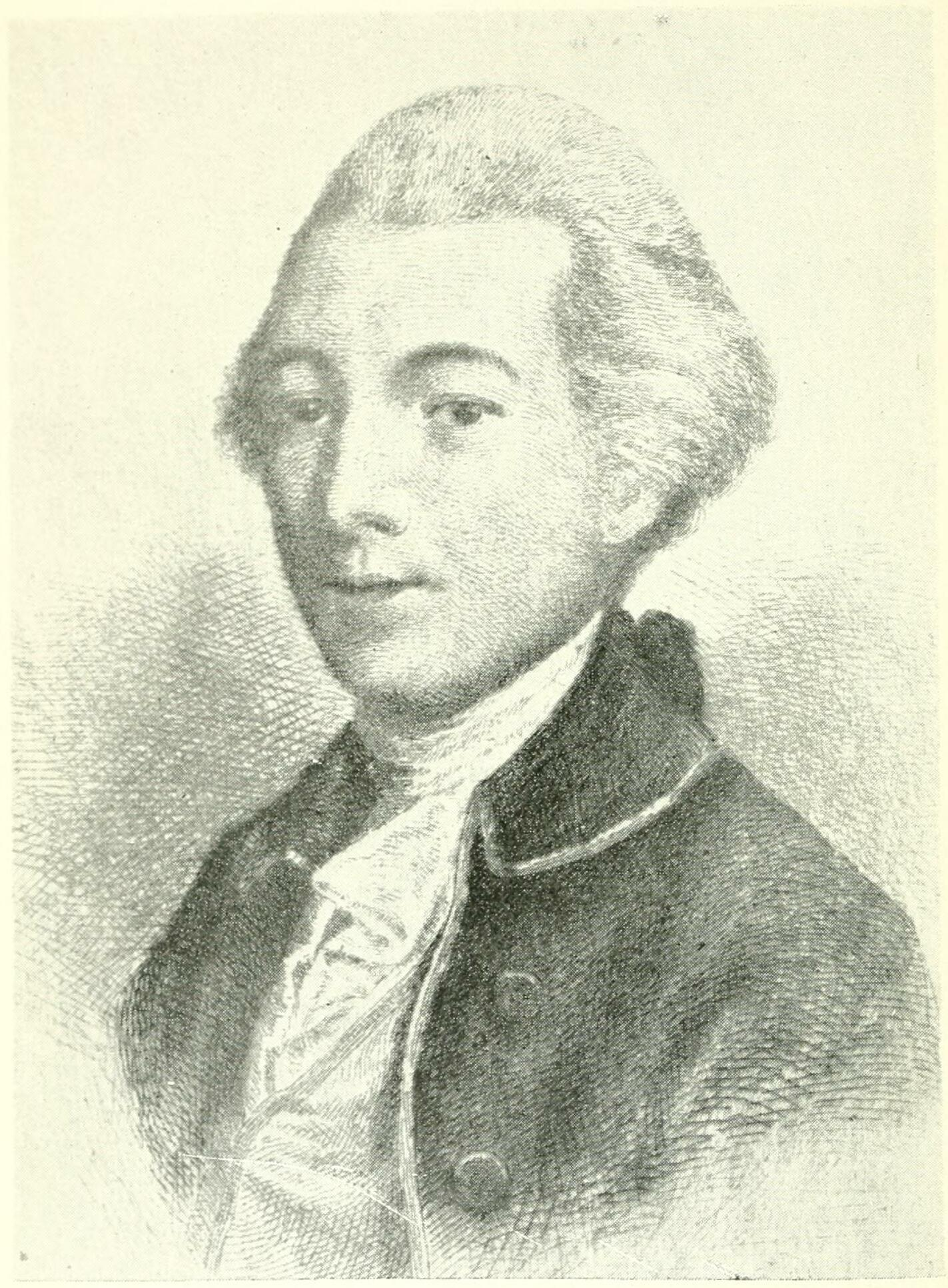
- Colonel George Baylor
- Born: January 17, 1752; New Market, Virginia
- Died: November 9, 1784 (aged 32); Bridgetown, Barbados
- Military career
- Allegiance: United States
- Branch: Continental Army
- Rank: Bvt. Brigadier General
- Commands: 3rd Regiment of Continental Light Dragoons
- Conflicts: Baylor Massacre

George Baylor (January 17, 1752 – November 9, 1784) was an officer in the Continental Army, serving throughout the American Revolutionary War.

== Military career ==
Baylor was first aide-de-camp to George Washington, and brought the news of the Battle of Trenton to the Continental Congress. He was later appointed to lead the 3rd Regiment of Continental Light Dragoons, which often acted as the escort for Martha Washington. While commanding his Dragoons in September 1778, his forces were attacked on the night of the 28th as they slept in local homes and barns on Overkill Road in what is now River Vale, New Jersey. The attack came to be known as the Baylor Massacre. Colonel Baylor and his men were on an information gathering assignment for General Washington when they were attacked by General "No Flint" Grey's men. The British had many loyal friends among the farmers of that area, and it is suspected that one of the farmers alerted the British about the placement of Baylor's men, who were attacked and quickly overrun. The wounded were taken to the Tappan Dutch Reformed Church a few miles north over the New York border. There, Baylor's second-in-command Major Alexander Clough died. Baylor received a bayonet wound in the lung and was captured, but was later able to rejoin the Continental forces. Along with a number of other colonels, he was promoted to brevet brigadier general at the end of the war.

The location of their bodies remained a secret until they were unearthed in an archaeological dig in the 1960s. Many artifacts were found, but their location is now unknown.

There is a park dedicated to the Baylor Massacre on Rivervale Road in River Vale.

== Death ==
Baylor never completely recovered from his injuries, and following the end of the war in 1783, he journeyed to Barbados to regain his health. However, he continued to weaken and died there in 1784.

== Family ==
- One of his nephews was US Congressman Robert Emmett Bledsoe Baylor.
- Another of his nephews was the Alabama politician and judge Walker Keith Baylor, the younger brother of Robert.
- His father was Col. John Baylor III (1705–1772). On Col. Baylor III, see Thomas Katheder, The Baylors of Newmarket: The Decline and Fall of a Virginia Planter Family (New York and Bloomington, Ind., 2009).
- Two of his grandnephews were Confederate officers: John Robert Baylor and George Wythe Baylor

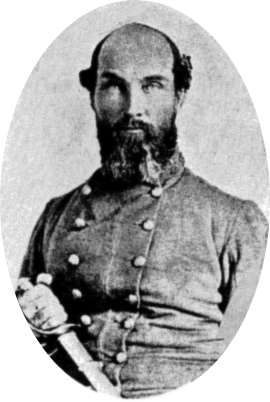
Lieutenant Colonel John Baylor

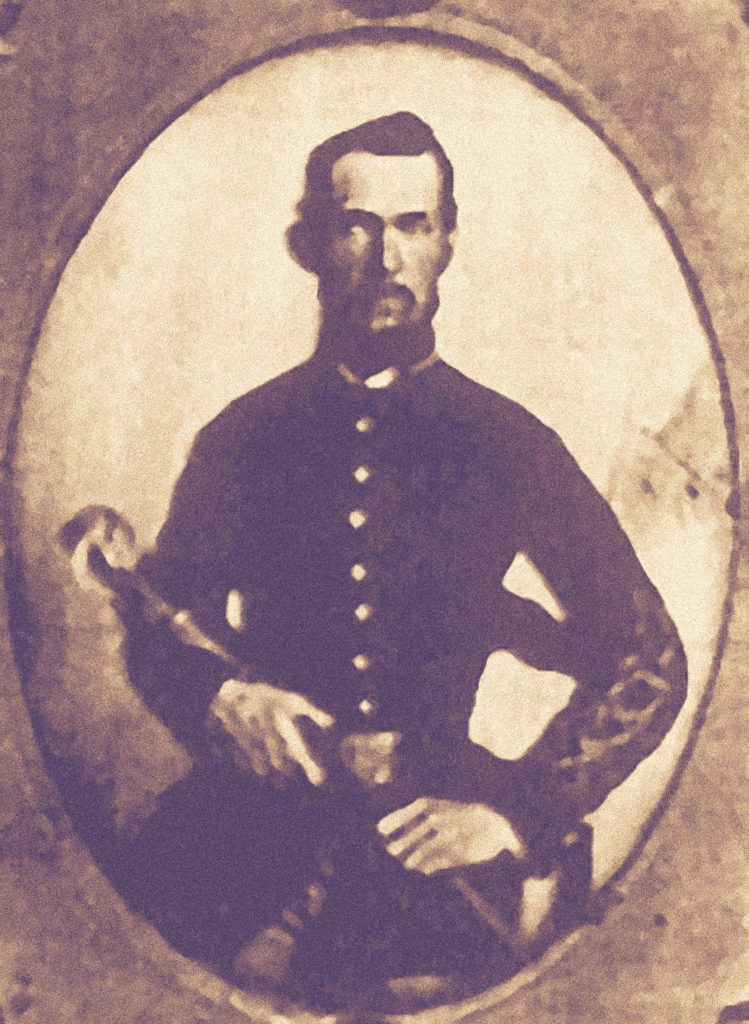
George Wythe Baylor in uniform, 1861–65
