= Francis Jones =

Francis Jones may refer to:

== Arts ==
- Francis Coates Jones (1857–1932), American painter
- Francis Jones (historian) (1908–1993), Welsh author, archivist, historian and officer of arms
- Francis R. Jones (born 1955), poetry translator and Reader in Translation Studies, Newcastle University
- Francis William Doyle Jones (1873–1938), British sculptor

== Politics ==
- Francis Jones (American politician), U.S. Representative from Tennessee, 1817–1823
- Francis Jones (Canadian politician) (1815–1887), Conservative MP of the Province of Canada and Parliament of Canada 1861–1874
- Francis Jones (Lord Mayor) (1559–1622), English merchant and Lord Mayor of London, 1620

== Others ==
- Francis Jones (physicist) (1914–1988), co-developer of Oboe blind bombing system, chief scientist, AAE Farnborough
- Francis Avery Jones (1910–1998), British physician and gastroenterologist

== See also ==
- Frank Jones (disambiguation)
- Frances Jones (disambiguation)
