= Frances Jones =

Frances Jones may refer to:

- Frances Jones (colonist) (1710–1785), mother of the first First Lady of the United States, Martha Washington
- Frances Follin Jones (1912–1999), American classicist and curator at the Art Museum, Princeton University
- Frances Jones Mills (1920–1996), state official in Kentucky
- Lady Frances Armstrong-Jones (born 1979), daughter of Antony Armstrong-Jones, 1st Earl of Snowdon
- Frances Bannerman (née Jones, 1855–1940), Canadian poet
- Frances R. Jones (1911–?), American state legislator in Pennsylvania
- Frances Môn Jones (1919–2000), Welsh harpist and teacher

== See also ==
- Francis Jones (disambiguation)
- Frances Holk-Jones, member of the Alabama House of Representatives
