= Eagle Springs, Texas =

Community in Texas

Eagle Springs was a community situated 16 miles (26 km) southeast of Gatesville in Coryell County, Texas. The community supposedly received its name when the survey party at the site saw an eagle fly up from the spring. John McClain established a Baptist church there in 1858. A post office later opened up in 1869. In 1882, the community's population was at 75 residents. Two years later in 1884, the community grew to having three general stores, two churches, a district school, and 200 residents. The farmers in the area shipped cotton and grain. The community then began to decline in the 1890s when its population fell to 100 residents. The post office was then discontinued in 1901 and the mail for the community was sent to Moody. The school was then consolidated with a nearby school in 1936. The church was disbanded in 1948, and by the 1980s, only a few scattered houses remained in the area.

== Sources ==
- Smyrl, Vivian Elizabeth (January 1, 1995). "Eagle Springs, TX". Handbook of Texas Online. Texas State Historical Association.
