= Frank Jones (Texas Ranger) =

American frontier lawman (1856–1893)

Captain Frank L. Jones (1856–1893) of the Texas Rangers was a frontier lawman.

He was killed in the line of duty, while trying to capture a band of outlaws, near El Paso, Texas, on June 30, 1893.

He married Helen, daughter of fellow Texas Ranger George W. Baylor.

== Sources ==
- Hunter, J. Marvin (January 1929). "The Killing Of Captain Frank Jones". Frontier Times, Vol. 6 No. 04. pp. 1ff.
- "Another Foul Murder by the Notorious Bosque Gang / Captain Frank L. Jones". El Paso Times. July 1, 1893. p. 7.
