= Frances Courtenay Baylor =

American author

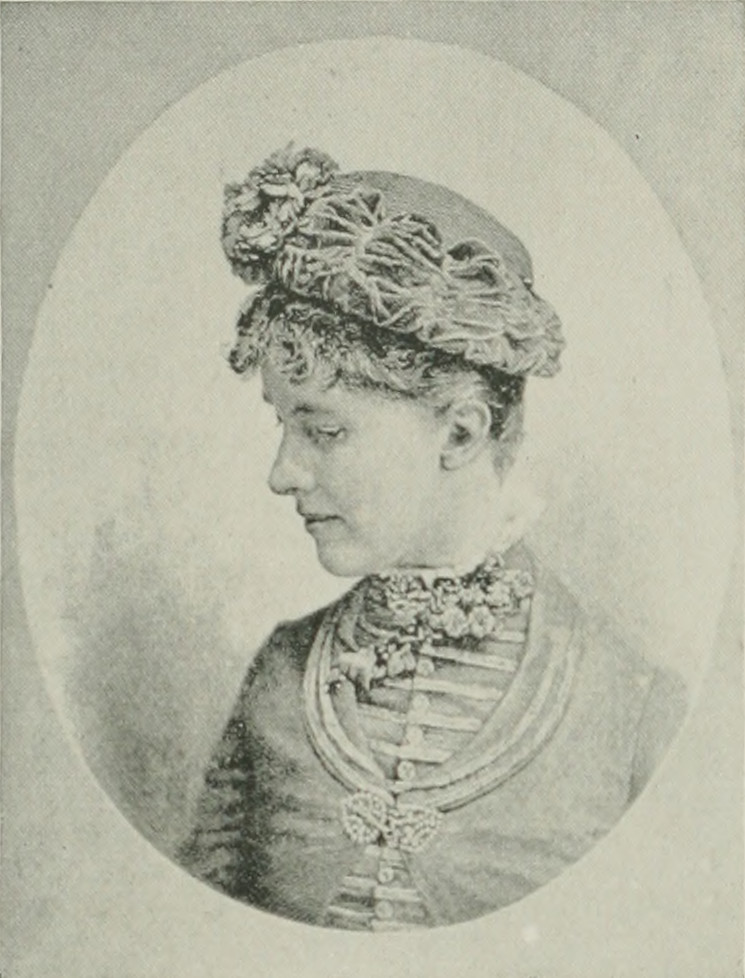
- Born: Frances Courtenay Dawson; January 20, 1848; Fort Smith
- Died: October 15, 1920 (aged 72); Winchester
- Occupation: Novelist, short story writer, writer
- Spouse: George Barnum (m. 1896)

Frances Courtenay Barnum (née Dawson, later Baylor; January 20, 1848 – October 15, 1920) was an American writer of fiction.

== Biography ==
Frances Courtenay Dawson was born in Fort Smith, Arkansas on January 20, 1848. Her father, James Dawson, was an army officer, and her childhood was spent in San Antonio and New Orleans, where her father was stationed.

During her teen years her parents divorced and Frances began using her mother's maiden name, Baylor. After the Civil War ended, she spent several years (1865–67, 1873–74) traveling and living in Europe.

In the late 1870s, she began contributing articles to newspapers and periodicals such as the Atlantic Monthly and the Princeton Review. In 1885 she published a well-received first novel, On Both Sides, that examined the differing manners and customs of American and English society.

== Family ==
In 1896, Frances married George Barnum, who died shortly after they were wed. After his death she moved to Winchester, Virginia, where she spent the remainder of her life. She died in Winchester on October 15, 1920, aged 72.

== Bibliography ==
- On Both Sides (1885)
- Behind the Blue Ridge (1887)
- Juan and Juanita (1888)
- A Shocking Example, and Other Sketches (1889)
- Claudia Hyde (1894)
- Miss Nina Barrow (1897)
- The Ladder of Fortune (1899)
- A Georgian Bungalow (1900)
