= Jesse Bledsoe =

American politician (1776–1836)

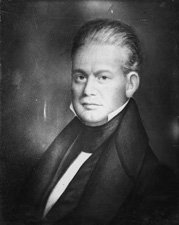

United States Senator from Kentucky
- In office March 4, 1813 – December 24, 1814
- Preceded by: John Pope
- Succeeded by: Isham Talbot

6th Secretary of State of Kentucky
- In office September 1, 1808 – July 26, 1812
- Governor: Charles Scott
- Preceded by: William C. Greenup
- Succeeded by: Fielding Winlock

Member of the Kentucky Senate
- In office 1817–1820

Member of the Kentucky House of Representatives
- In office 1817

Personal details
- Born: April 6, 1776 Culpeper County, Virginia
- Died: June 25, 1836 (aged 60) Nacogdoches, Texas
- Party: Democratic-Republican

Jesse Bledsoe (April 6, 1776 – June 25, 1836) was a slave owner and Senator from Kentucky.

== Life and career ==
Bledsoe was born in Culpeper County, Virginia in 1776. When he was very young, his family migrated with a Baptist congregation through Cumberland Gap into Kentucky. Many of the adults in this traveling congregation were property: Negro slaves. Jesse attended Transylvania Seminary and Transylvania University in Lexington, Kentucky, where he studied law. He was admitted to the bar about 1800 and commenced practice.

In 1808, Bledsoe was appointed Secretary of State. He was a member of the Kentucky House of Representatives in 1812. Afterwards he was elected as a Democratic Republican to the United States Senate and served from March 4, 1813, until his resignation on December 24, 1814. He then became a member of the Kentucky Senate in 1817, serving until 1820. That year, he served as a member of the Electoral College, voting for James Monroe.

Bledsoe was judge of the Lexington circuit in 1822. He settled in Lexington and was professor of law in Transylvania University. He then became minister in the Disciples Church. He moved to Mississippi in 1833 and to Texas in 1835. He died near Nacogdoches, Texas under circumstances his contemporaries and kinfolk could only describe as a significant fall from grace.

Sometimes a volatile being, he earned the sobriquet "Hot headed" Jesse Bledsoe. Besides being a prominent jurist, he was a maternal uncle to many notable individuals including, but not limited to, Robert Emmett Bledsoe Baylor, who studied law under him, Walker Keith Baylor, who served in both chambers of the Alabama Legislature and as a judge, Thomas Chilton, who likewise represented Kentucky in Congress, and William Parish Chilton, a provisional congressman of the Confederacy from Alabama.

== Sources ==
- United States Congress. "Jesse Bledsoe (id: B000554)". Biographical Directory of the United States Congress.
- Allen, William B. (1872). A History of Kentucky: Embracing Gleanings, Reminiscences, Antiquities, Natural Curiosities, Statistics, and Biographical Sketches of Pioneers, Soldiers, Jurists, Lawyers, Statesmen, Divines, Mechanics, Farmers, Merchants, and Other Leading Men, of All Occupations and Pursuits. Bradley & Gilbert. p. 260.

Political offices
Preceded by William C. Greenup	Secretary of State of Kentucky; 1808–1812	Succeeded by Fielding Winlock
U.S. Senate
Preceded by John Pope	U.S. senator (Class 3) from Kentucky; 1813–1814; Served alongside: George M. Bibb, George Walker, William T. Barry	Succeeded by Isham Talbot
