= 3rd Continental Light Dragoons =

3rd Continental Light Dragoons 3rd Legionary Corps
- Active: 1777–1782
- Country: United States
- Allegiance: Continental Congress
- Type: Dragoon
- Size: Regiment of six troops approx. 160 men in 1778
- Part of: Continental Army
- Nickname: Baylor's Horse
- Colors: White coats with blue facings
- Engagements: Battle of Brandywine, Battle of Germantown; Baylor Massacre; Fort Wilson Riot; Battle of Guilford Court House

Commanders
- Notable commanders: Lt. Col. George Baylor, Lt. Col. William Washington

The 3rd Continental Light Dragoons (CLD), also known as Baylor's Horse or Lady Washington's Horse, was a mounted regiment of the Continental Army raised on January 1, 1777, at Morristown, New Jersey. The regiment saw action at the Battle of Brandywine, the Battle of Germantown and the Battle of Guilford Court House.

The regiment was surprised on the night of September 27, 1778, while sleeping in barns near Old Tappan, New Jersey, in close proximity to British positions. Referred to by the Continentals as the "Baylor Massacre", at least 67 men were casualties and 70 horses killed. Among the captured was the regimental commander, Lt. Col. George Baylor, who was replaced on November 20, 1778, by Lt. Col. William Washington, transferred from the 4th Continental Light Dragoons. In 1779, while recruiting and remounting, the regiment rescued James Wilson during the "Fort Wilson Riot". The 3rd CLD was posted to the Southern department on November 1, 1779.

Losses of 15 killed, 17 wounded, and 100 men captured along with 83 horses in a night attack by British Lt. Col. Banastre Tarleton on April 14, 1780, led to the unofficial amalgamation of the regiment with the 1st Continental Light Dragoons, commonly known as the "1st and 3rd Light Dragoons" as Washington deferred to his friend and senior, Lt. Col. Anthony White, whom he had served under in the 4th CLD. Washington resumed command of the unit on May 6, 1780, when it was attacked on the Santee River and White captured.

In the 1781 campaign, Washington and his men distinguished themselves in mounted charges at the Battle of Cowpens in January, the Battle of Guilford Court House in March, and the Battle of Eutaw Springs in September. At Eutaw Springs Washington was pinned under his fallen mount, bayoneted, and captured. Captain William Parsons, the senior surviving officer, commanded the corps until Lt-Col. Baylor was exchanged in June 1782 and resumed command. When the companies of the 4th CLD were parceled out during the siege of Yorktown, the 1st and 3rd accepted its few remaining mounted troopers.

The regiment was officially merged into the 1st Legionary Corps on November 2, 1782, with the consolidated unit of five troops designated the 1st Legionary Corps.

A member of the 3rd Continental Dragoons was Maryland Congressman Philip Stuart.
