= Frank Leith Jones =

American official and historian

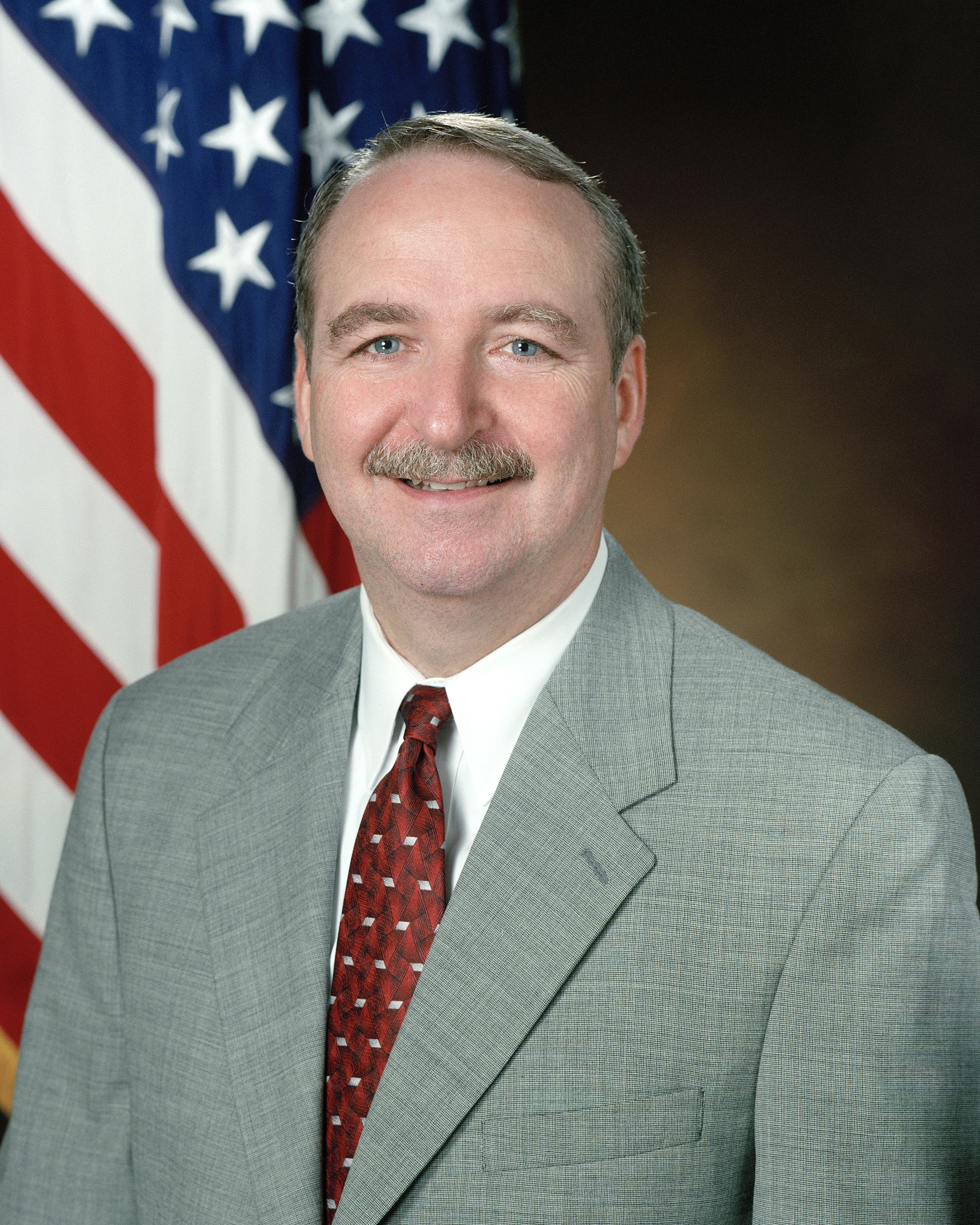
Frank L. Jones in 1999

Frank Leith Jones Jr. (born 5 September 1951) is an American academic, public servant and military historian. He published his first book in 2013, Blowtorch: Robert Komer, Vietnam, and American Cold War Strategy, a biography of Robert Komer who served as "national security policy and strategy adviser" to three Presidents. In 2020, he published Sam Nunn: Statesman of the Nuclear Age, a study of the impact Senator Nunn had on US national security and policy during the Cold War and its immediate aftermath. His book Obama and the Bomb: New START, Russia and the Politics of Post-Cold War Arms Control was published in 2025. It is a study of how President Barack Obama and his administration used the negotiation and ratification of an arms control treaty, the New Strategic Arms Reduction Treaty (New START), as a vehicle for advancing one of the president’s primary foreign policy objectives, a reset of US relations with Russia in the early years of his first term of office

== Early life and education ==
Frank Leith Jones was born in Boston, Massachusetts. He earned a Bachelor of Arts degree from St. Lawrence University, a Master of Public Administration degree from the University at Albany (SUNY), and a PhD in political science from Griffith University, Queensland, Australia.

== Career ==
=== Public Service ===
Jones first joined the United States Army as a commissioned officer during the Vietnam era. In 1979, he switched to public service as a civilian serving as a President Management Intern with the Department of the Army. Subsequently, he held a number of high-ranking positions in the Department of Defense. In 2006, he retired as a career member of the Senior Executive Service.

=== Academia ===
After leaving public service, Jones turned to teaching Security Studies as a professor at the U.S Army War College in Carlisle, PA. He retired from the faculty of the Army War College in 2022. He is currently a distinguished fellow of the Army War College.

=== Awards ===
Jones was awarded the "Brigadier General James L. Collins Jr. Book Prize In Military History" for the best book written in English on U.S. military history, 2015 by the U.S. Commission on Military History.

== Selected publications ==
- A "Hollow Army" Reappraised: President Carter, Defense Budgets, and the Politics of Military Readiness.
- Blowtorch : Robert Komer, Vietnam, and American Cold War strategy. Annapolis, Maryland : Naval Institute Press, [2013] ISBN 9781612512280. OCLC 813910349.
- Sam Nunn: Statesman of the Nuclear Age. Lawrence, KS : University Press of Kansas, [2020] ISBN 9780700630127. OCLC 1145089936.
- Obama and the Bomb: New START, Russia and the Politics of Post-Cold War Arms Control. Palgrave Macmillan [2025] 978-3-032-02571-5

== Personal ==
Jones is the son of Frank Leith Jones Sr. and Marie Clementine Smith.

On 29 January 1977, Jones Jr. married Sharon Marie Peters in Virginia Beach, Virginia.
