= Ross Prairie, Texas =

Unincorporated community in Texas, US

Ross Prairie is a farming community situated two miles (3.2 km) south of Fayetteville in Fayette County, Texas. First settled in the 1820s by James J. Ross, in the 1840s and '50s the land attracted German and Bohemian immigrants who built the church there.

== Sources ==
- Carroll, Jeff (March 1, 1995). "Ross Prairie, TX". Handbook of Texas Online. Texas State Historical Association.
