= Baylor, West Virginia =

Unincorporated community in West Virginia, United States

Baylor
- Unincorporated community
- Location within the state of West Virginia Baylor (the United States)
- Coordinates: 37°45′32″N 81°17′38″W
- Country: United States
- State: West Virginia
- County: Raleigh
- Elevation: 1,995 ft (608 m)
- Time zone: UTC-5 (Eastern (EST))
  - Summer (DST): UTC-4 (EDT)
- GNIS feature ID: 1742663

Baylor is an unincorporated community located in Raleigh County, West Virginia, United States.
