= Baylor Massacre =

1778 engagement of the American Revolutionary War

Coordinates: 41.012896°N 74.008144°W

- Part of the American Revolutionary War
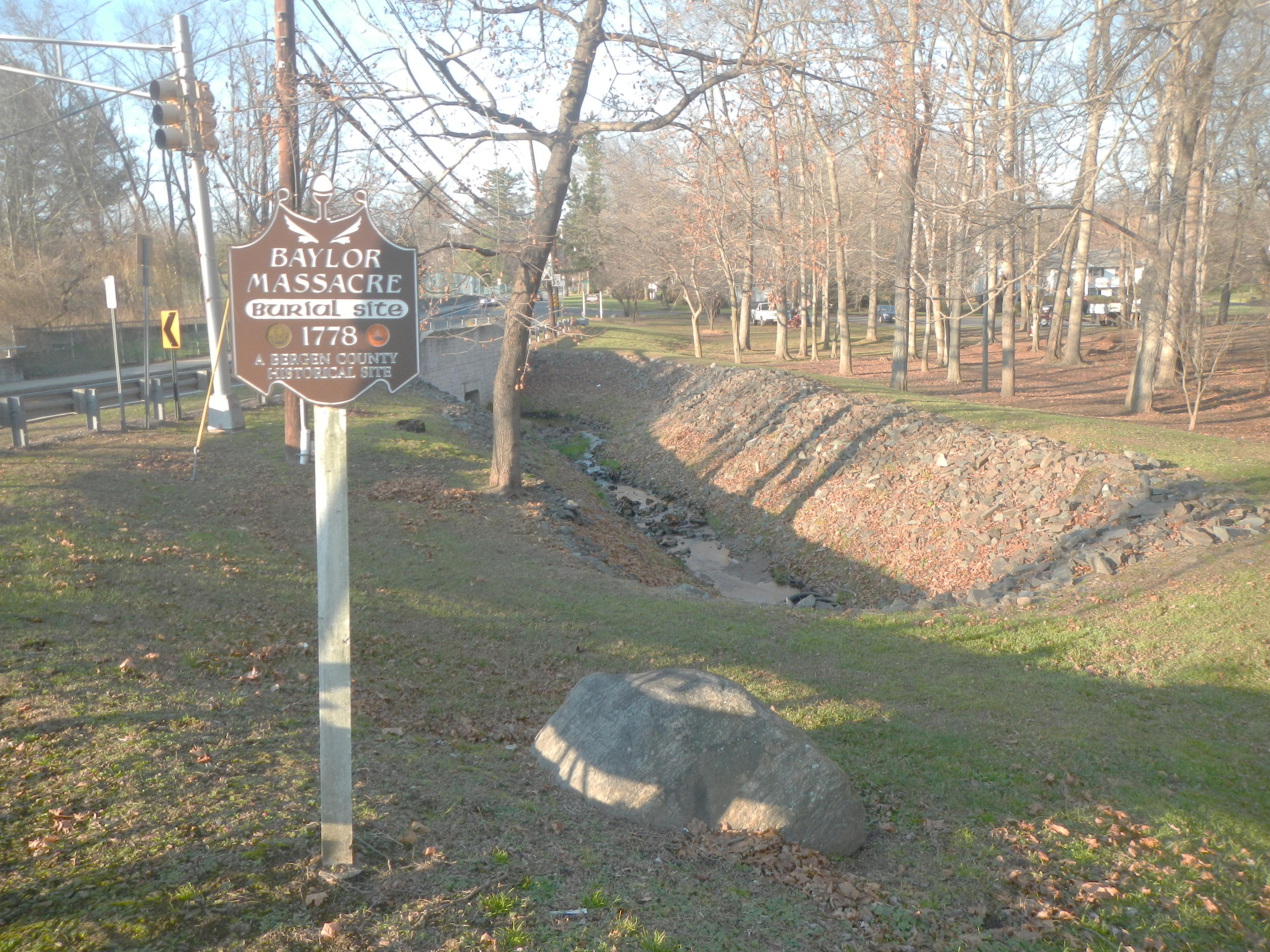
- County Historical Site in 2012
Date	September 27, 1778
Location	River Vale, New Jersey
Result	British victory

Belligerents
Great Britain	United States

Commanders and leaders
Charles Grey; John Maitland; Turner Straubenzee	George Baylor (surrendered)

Strength
650	116

Casualties and losses
1 killed	15 killed 54 wounded or captured

The Baylor Massacre (also known as the Skirmish Near Tappan, the Tappan Massacre or the Raid on Old Tappan) was an attack by British forces against Continental Army troops on September 27, 1778, during the American Revolutionary War. A force of British soldiers under the command of Major-General Charles Grey carried a successful surprise attack against the 3rd Regiment of Continental Light Dragoons under the command of Colonel George Baylor near present-day River Vale, New Jersey. 15 Continental Army soldiers were killed while a further 54 were wounded or captured by the British, who lost one soldier killed.

== Background ==
On September 22, 1778, Lieutenant-General Sir Henry Clinton ordered Major-General Charles Grey, Major-General Lord Cornwallis and Brigadier-General Edward Mathew to mobilize troops in an effort to provoke Continental Army commander George Washington into a battle, and as a diversion for a raid against a Patriot privateering base in southern New Jersey. After learning that Colonel George Baylor had secured quarters for his unit, 12 officers and 104 enlisted men of the 3rd Regiment of Continental Light Dragoons, in the barns of several farms on Over Kill Road—from Dutch "across the river", since renamed Rivervale Road—Cornwallis ordered Grey to attack Baylor's troops.

== Battle ==
At around 11 o'clock on the night of September 27, 1778, Grey mobilized the 2nd Battalion of Light Infantry, the 2nd Battalion of Grenadiers, as well as the 33rd and 64th regiments of foot. Between one and three o'clock in the morning, six companies of British light infantry under Major Turner Straubenzee and six companies of light infantry under Major John Maitland approached a collection of three farm houses and six barns occupied by 116 men of the 3rd Light Dragoons. (This unit of Virginia cavalry is variously referred to as "Lady Washington's Dragoons" and "Mrs. Washington’s Guards".) Maitland's detachment was used to cut off the night patrol, while Straubenzee's troops used their bayonets to maintain the element of surprise as they went from house to house.

Deaths on the American side included two officers and nine men being killed in action, with another four later dying of their wounds. The total loss for the Continentals was 69 killed, wounded, or captured. Colonel Baylor, Major Alexander Clough, and two other officers attempted to escape by climbing up a chimney. Baylor was wounded and captured — he died in 1784 from complications of the wounds incurred in the attack. Clough was mortally wounded in the attack. One of the other officers was killed and several others captured.

== Aftermath ==
After the attack, some of the injured prisoners were taken to the Reformed Church of Tappan in nearby Tappan, New York, which served as a prison and hospital. Captain Martin Hunter of the 52nd Regiment of Foot described the attack: "While at New Bridge we heard of their being within twenty-five miles of our camp, and a plan was laid to surprise them. We set out after dark, mounted behind dragoons, and so perfectly secure did the enemy think themselves that not even a sentry was posted. Not a shot was fired, and the whole regiment of dragoons, except a few who were bayoneted, were taken prisoner."

The raid for which this attack was a diversion also included an attack on American forces that has been described by Patriot sources as a massacre. On October 15, Loyalist troops executed a surprise attack on forces under the command of Casimir Pulaski in which 25 to 30 men were killed in what is known as the affair at Little Egg Harbor. In 1967, the remains of six of the dead — recognized from artifacts such as buttons and clothing remnants — were found in three abandoned vats from Blauvelt's Tannery. In 1972, facing suburban development, the site was dedicated as a county park and the remains were re-interred there.

== See also ==
- Northern theater of the American Revolutionary War after Saratoga
