= James Huckins =

American Baptist minister and missionary (1807–1863)

Reverend James Huckins
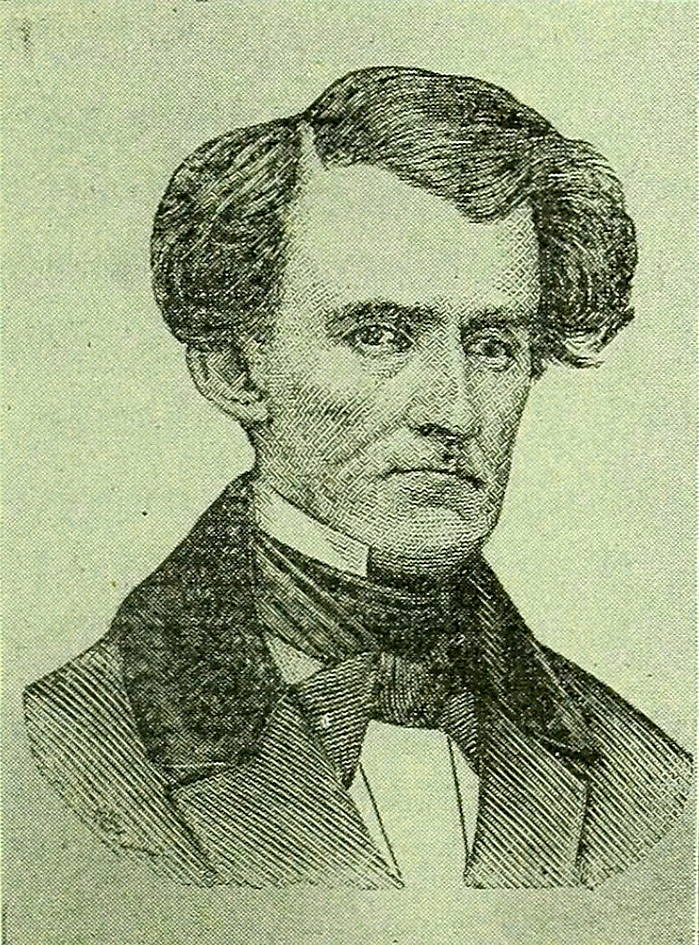
- Rev. James Huckins 1902 sketches portrait
- Born: April 8, 1807; Dorchester, New Hampshire
- Died: August 6, 1863 (aged 56); Texas
- Education: Brown University
- Occupation(s): Baptist preacher, editor, churches organizer
- Organization(s): Baptist State Convention of North Carolina; Baylor University
- Known for: Co-founding Baylor University; University of Mary Hardin–Baylor organizing first Baptist churches in Galveston

Huckins James (April 8, 1807 – August 6, 1863) was an American ordained Baptist minister, the first Southern Baptist missionary of Texas, an educator, and a church organizer.

== Background ==
James was an orphan who was born in Dorchester, New Hampshire and was adopted by a local farmer at the age of six. He was baptized at the age of fourteen.

== Education and career ==
He attended Brown University and studied theology. In 1840 he was sent by the American Baptist Home Missionary Society to report on the conditions there. He organized one of the first Baptist churches in Galveston. He also established the first Baptist church in Houston and was editor of the Texas column in Baptist banner. He retired from the Home Missionary Society in 1845 and became a member of the Domestic Mission Board of Southern Baptist Convention due to issues of slavery. He served as president of the Texas Baptist Association for three terms.

== 19th century Union ==
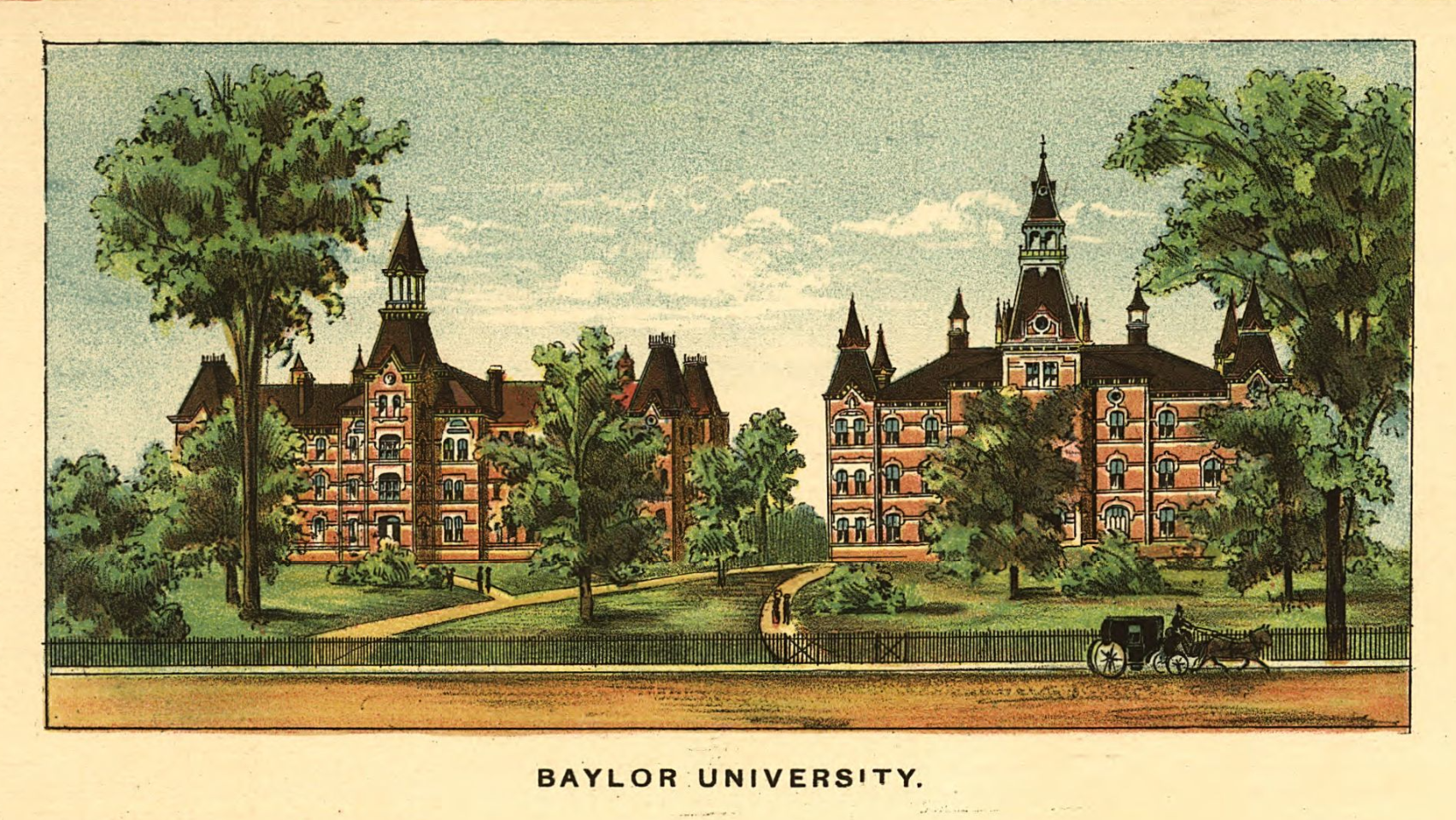
Baylor university in 1882

As an influential frontier Baptist minister of Texas in the 19th century, he established schools and churches. He was a member of the Union Association, Baptist Home Mission Society, and the Baptist Educational Society in Texas and was one of the trustees of Baylor University when the institution was established in 1845. In 1859 he left Texas for the Baptist Church of South Carolina as a Confederate Army chaplain.

== Establishment of Mary Hard-Baylor University ==
He was the founding member of University of Mary Hardin–Baylor in Belton, Texas, in 1839, where he and Rev. Williams Tryon had been sent as a missionary by the Home Mission Board in New York.
