= John Walker Baylor =

American pioneer and soldier (1813–1836)

John Walker Baylor Jr. (c. 1813–1836) was a Texian pioneer and soldier.

He was born at Woodlawn, Kentucky, around December 1813. His father, John Walker Baylor Sr., a United States Army surgeon, was the son of Major Walker Baylor. His brothers George W., Henry W., and John R. Baylor were noted Texas rangers and soldiers.

According to his family, Baylor left the Alamo as a courier, probably on February 25, 1836. He died on September 3, 1836, in Cahaba, Alabama, of complications from wounds suffered at the Battle of San Jacinto.

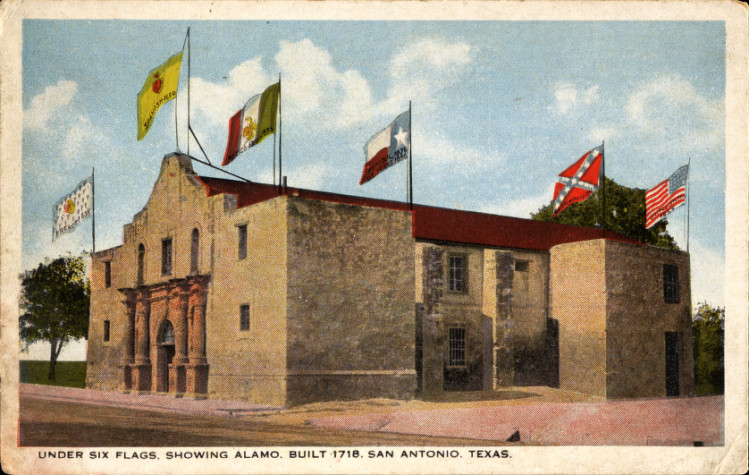
Under Six Flags, c. 1915–1924

== See also ==
- List of Texian survivors of the Battle of the Alamo

== Sources ==
- Groneman, Bill (1990). Alamo Defenders: A Genealogy, the People and Their Words. Austin: Eakin Press. ISBN 978-0-89015-757-2.
- Todish, Timothy J.; Todish, Terry; Spring, Ted (1998). Alamo Sourcebook, 1836: A Comprehensive Guide to the Battle of the Alamo and the Texas Revolution. Austin: Eakin Press. ISBN 978-1-57168-152-2.
- Walraven, Bill (July 25, 2018). "Baylor, John Walker". Handbook of Texas. Texas State Historical Association. Retrieved March 23, 2023.
