= Henry Weidner Baylor =

American physician and Texas Ranger (c.1818–1853)

- Born: c. 1818; Paris, Kentucky, US
- Died: August 4, 1853 (aged 34–35); Independence, Texas, US
- Military career
- Allegiance: United States
- Service: United States Army
- Rank: Captain
- Conflicts: Mexican–American War; Battle of Monterrey; American Indian Wars

Henry Weidner Baylor (c. 1818–1853) was an American medical doctor, soldier, and Texas Ranger. Baylor County, Texas was named for him.

== See also ==
- R. E. B. Baylor
- John R. Baylor
- George W. Baylor

== Sources ==
- Cutrer, Thomas W. (July 25, 2018). "Baylor, Henry Weidner (1818–1853)". Handbook of Texas Online. Texas State Historical Association.
