= Alan Jones =

Alan Jones may refer to:

== Sport ==
- Alan Jones (racing driver) (1946–2026), Australian racing driver and Formula One World Champion 1980
- Alan Jones (bobsleigh) (born 1946), British Olympic bobsledder
- Alan Jones (Australian cricketer) (born 1948), Australian cricketer
- Alan Jones (Scottish cricketer) (1927–2009), Scottish cricketer
- Alan Jones (cricketer, born 1938), Welsh cricketer
- Alan Jones (cricketer, born 1957), former Welsh cricketer
- Alan Jones (footballer, born 1939), Welsh football goalkeeper
- Alan Jones (footballer, born 1944), Welsh football winger
- Alan Jones (footballer, born 1945) (1945–2023), Welsh footballer
- Alan Jones (footballer, born 1951), English footballer

== Entertainers ==
- Alan Jones (talkback host) (born 1941), Australian talkback host and former rugby coach
- Alan Jones (cinematographer), cinematographer active 1984–1996; see Love Is All There Is
- Alan Jones (drummer) (born 1962), American jazz drummer
- Alan Jones (bassist) (born 1947), English bass guitar player with groups such as The Shadows
- Alan Rankin Jones (1902–1945), American jazz pianist, composer, and lyricist

== Science ==
- Alan A. Jones (1944–2006), American chemistry professor
- Alan M. Jones (born 1957), American cell biologist
- Alan Hywel Jones (born 1970), British materials scientist

== Others ==
- Alan Jones (architect) (born 1964), Ulster architect
- Alan Jones (priest) (1940–2024), Dean of Grace Cathedral, San Francisco
- Alan Wayne Jones (born 1945), researcher and writer on the subject of human physiology relating to alcohol consumption
- Alan W. Jones (1894–1969), U.S. Army general during World War II
- Alan Jones (diplomat) (born 1953), former British High Commissioner to Sierra Leone and Belize
- Alan Jones (film critic), film critic, broadcaster, and reporter

== See also ==
- Allan Jones (disambiguation)
- Allen Jones (disambiguation)
- Alun Jones (disambiguation)
- Jones (surname)
