= Al Jones =

Al Jones may refer to:

- Al Jones (Negro leagues), American baseball player
- Al Jones (English musician) (Alun Jones, 1945–2008), English folk and blues singer, songwriter and guitarist
- Al Jones (1980s pitcher) (born 1959), American former professional baseball player
- Alfred Jones (boxer) (born 1946), American former Olympic boxer
- Al Jones (drummer) (1930–1976), American jazz drummer

== See also ==
- Alan Jones (disambiguation)
- Alun Jones (disambiguation)
- Allen Jones (disambiguation)
- Allan Jones (disambiguation)
- Alfred Jones (disambiguation)
- Albert Jones (disambiguation)
