= Alfred Jones =

Alfred Jones may refer to:

== Born before 1900 ==
- Alf Jones (footballer, born 1861) (1861–1935), Walsall and England footballer
- Alf Jones (Australian footballer) (1885–1929), Australian footballer for Melbourne
- Alfred Jones (engraver) (1819–1900), English engraver
- Alfred Jones (football manager) (fl. 1885–1915), Small Heath (Birmingham) manager 1892–1908
- Alfred Jones (Kent cricketer), English cricketer
- Alfred Jones (umpire) (1859–1949), cricket test match umpire
- Alfred D. Jones (1814–1902), first postmaster of Omaha City, Nebraska Territory
- Alfred D. Jones (architect) (1872–1915), American designer of buildings in Spokane, Washington
- Alfred Daniel Jones (1857–1893), North Carolina State Legislator and US Consul General, Shanghai
- Alfred Edwin Jones (1894–1973), Irish architect
- Alfred G. Jones (1846–1905), British Baptist missionary to China
- Alfred Garth Jones (1872–1955), English illustrator
- Alfred Gilpin Jones (1824–1906), Lieutenant-Governor of Nova Scotia
- Alfred Gresham Jones (1824–1915), Irish architect who moved to Australia after 1888
- Alfred James Jones (1871–1945), Australian politician
- Alfred Lewis Jones (1845–1909), British ship-owner
- Alfred M. Jones (1837–1910), American politician and businessman
- Alfred Stowell Jones (1832–1920), English recipient of the Victoria Cross
- Alfred T. Jones (1822–1888), American printer, editor, and communal leader

== Born in or after 1900 ==
- Alf Jones (footballer, born 1937) (1937–2024), English football full back for Leeds United and Lincoln City in the 1960s
- Alfie Jones (born 1997), English footballer for St Mirren
- Alfred Jones (boxer) (born 1946), American Olympic boxer
- Alfred Winslow Jones (1900–1989), hedge fund manager
- Alfred Jones (footballer, born 1902) (1902–?), English footballer for Crewe Alexandra and Stoke
- Alfred Jones (footballer, born 1900) (1900–1959), footballer for Wrexham
- Alfred Jones (Northamptonshire cricketer) (1900–1986), English cricketer
