= John Sutherland Whitewright =

- Born: 5 September 1858; Edinburgh, Scotland
- Died: 10 January 1926 (aged 67); Tianjin, China
- Occupation: missionary,
- Years active: 45 Years
- Known for: Establishment of Museums in China
- Spouse: Martha Alexandra Allen

John Sutherland Whitewright (Chinese: 怀恩光; pinyin: Huái Ēnguāng, 5 September 1858 in Edinburgh – 10 January 1926 in Tianjin) was a British Baptist missionary to China in the late 19th and early 20th century. He arrived in the city of Qingzhou, Shandong province in 1880 or in 1881. In 1886, he started a theological college in Qingzhou that would later develop into Gotch-Robinson Theological College. He directed the college with the assistance of Alfred G. Jones and J. Percy Bruce. In 1887, he established the Yidu Museum (named after the former Yidu County) in Qingzhou. In 1904, he moved with the museum to Jinan, where the museum became the Guangzhi Yuan. In 1917, he taught at the divinity school of Cheeloo University. His museum became a forerunner of the Shandong Provincial Museum.

== Works ==
- An introduction to Mandarin, published by T. Leslie at Kwang Hsueh Publishing House, 1922
- Pioneer museum work in China, Museums Journal, Feb., 1909, p. 266-77.
