= Albert Jones =

Albert Jones may refer to:

- Albert Beckford Jones (born 1958), American businessman
- Albert C. Jones (1944–2024), American politician
- Albert Edward Jones (1878–1954), English silversmith and designer
- Albert F. A. L. Jones (1920–2013), New Zealand astronomer
- Albert F. Jones (1858–1920), member of the California Senate, 1887–1890
- Albert Gamaliel Jones (c. 1812–c. 1880), American architect
- J. Albert Jones (1929–2021), American lawyer and politician
- Albert Jones (footballer, born 1883) (1883–1963), Nottingham Forest F.C. and Wales international footballer
- Albert M. Jones (1890–1967), American major general during World War II
- Cowboy Jones (Albert Edward Jones, 1874–1958), baseball pitcher
- Robert Albert Jones (1864–?), Welsh international footballer
- Arthur Jones (Conservative politician) (Albert Arthur Jones, 1915–1991), British Conservative MP

== See also ==
- Al Jones (disambiguation)
- Bert Jones (disambiguation)
- Albert Evans-Jones (1895–1970), Welsh poet and dramatist
