= Shandong Museum =

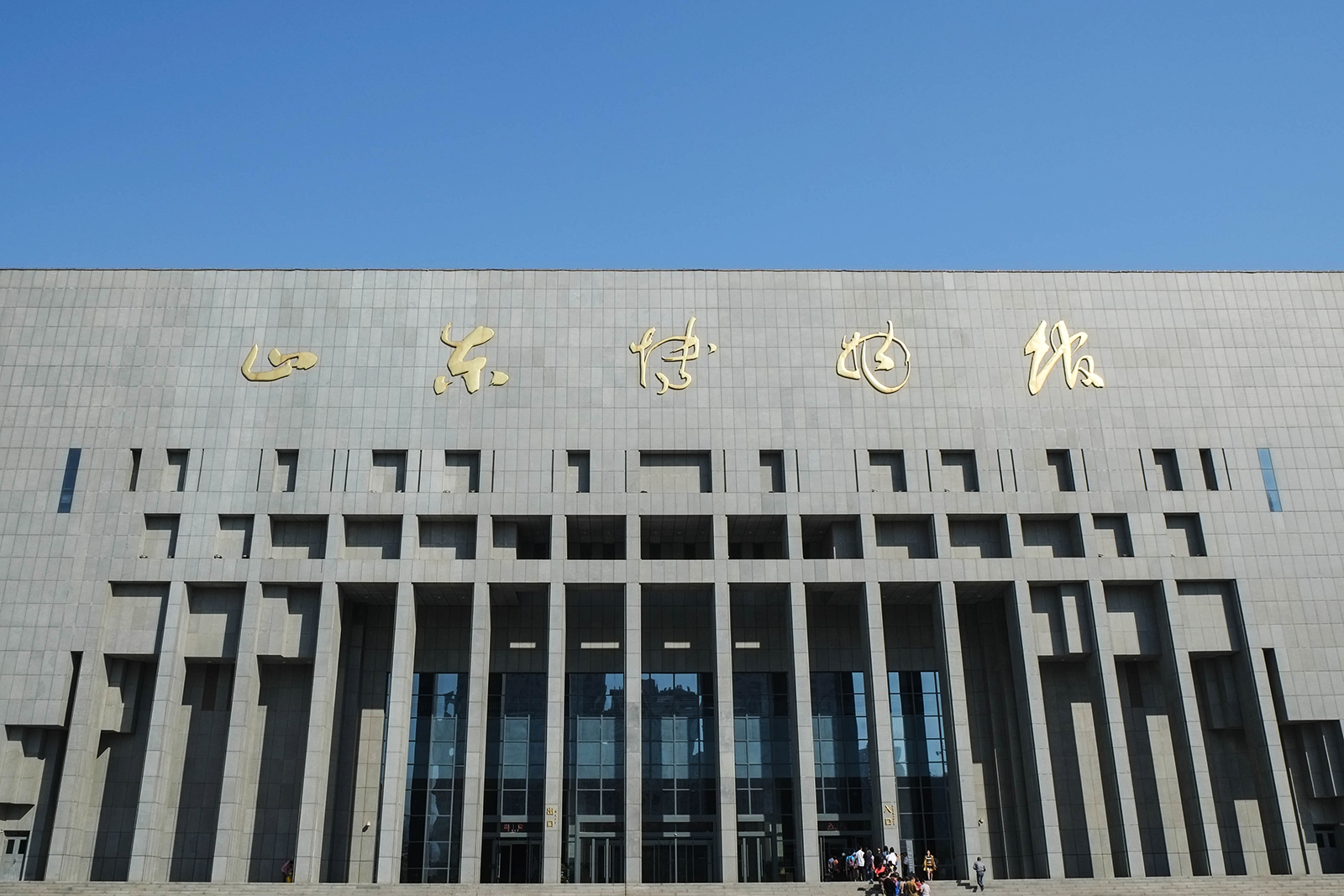

- Location of the museum Shandong Museum (China)
- Established: 1954
- Location: 11899 Jingshi E. Road, Lixia District, Jinan, Shandong, China
- Coordinates: 36°39′31.86″N 117°5′46.08″E
- Type: History museum
- Website: www.sdmuseum.com//

The Shandong Museum (Chinese: 山东博物馆; pinyin: Shāndōng Bówùguǎn) is the principal museum of Shandong Province. It is located in the City of Jinan, Shandong, China. It is one of the largest museums in the country.

The Shandong Museum occupies a building with 82,900 square meters of space and houses a collection of more than 210,000 historical artifacts. Highlights of the historical collection include relics from the Neolithic Dawenkou and Longshan cultures, bronze artifacts from the Shang and Zhou dynasties, stone carvings from the Han dynasty, and paintings from the Ming and Qing dynasties. The natural history section features fossils from Shanwang and a fossil skeleton of Shantungosaurus.

The forerunner of the Shandong Museum, the Yidu Museum, was established by the British Baptist missionary John Sutherland Whitewright in Qingzhou in 1887. The museum moved to Jinan in 1904 and was renamed to Guangzhi Yuan. In 1942, the museum expanded to a building in the compound of the Red Swastika Society on Shangxin Street. When the Shandong Provincial Museum (Chinese: 山东省博物馆; pinyin: Shāndōng Shěng Bówùguǎn) was founded in 1954, its collection of historical artifacts occupied the compound of the Red Swastika Society, whereas the Guangzhi Yuan housed its natural history collection. In August 1991, construction on a new building for the museum started in the south of Jinan, at the intersection of Li Shan Road and Jing Shiyi Road, near the Thousand Buddha Hill. The building was completed in October 1992, its street address is: Number 14 Jing Shiyi Road, Lixia District, Jinan. In December 2007, ground was broken for a new, significantly larger museum located on Yaojia Street in the Lixia District to the southeast of Jinan's city center. This new museum building was opened to the public on November 16, 2010. The official name of the new museum was shortened from "Shandong Provincial Museum" to "Shandong Museum".

== Gallery ==
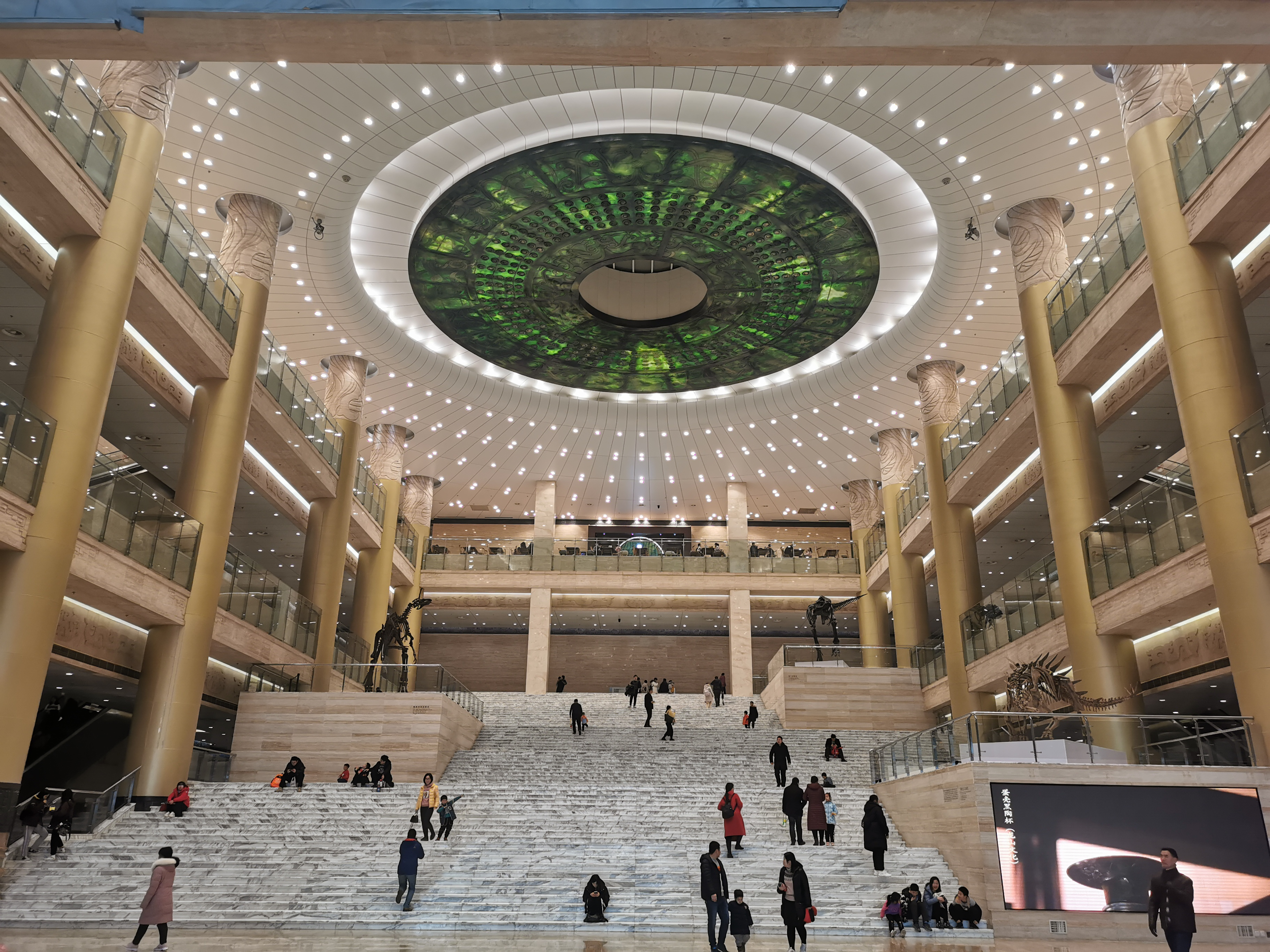

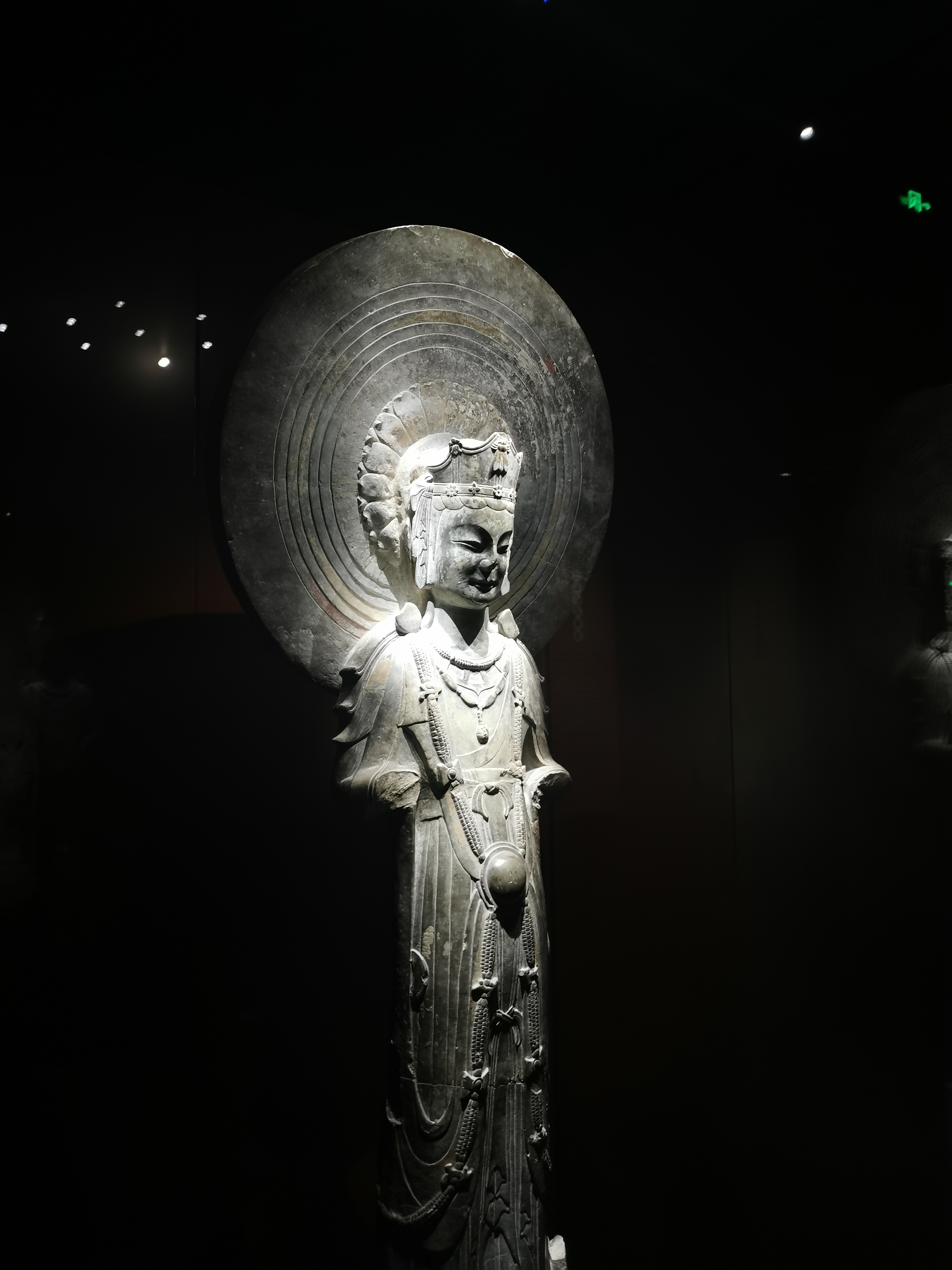

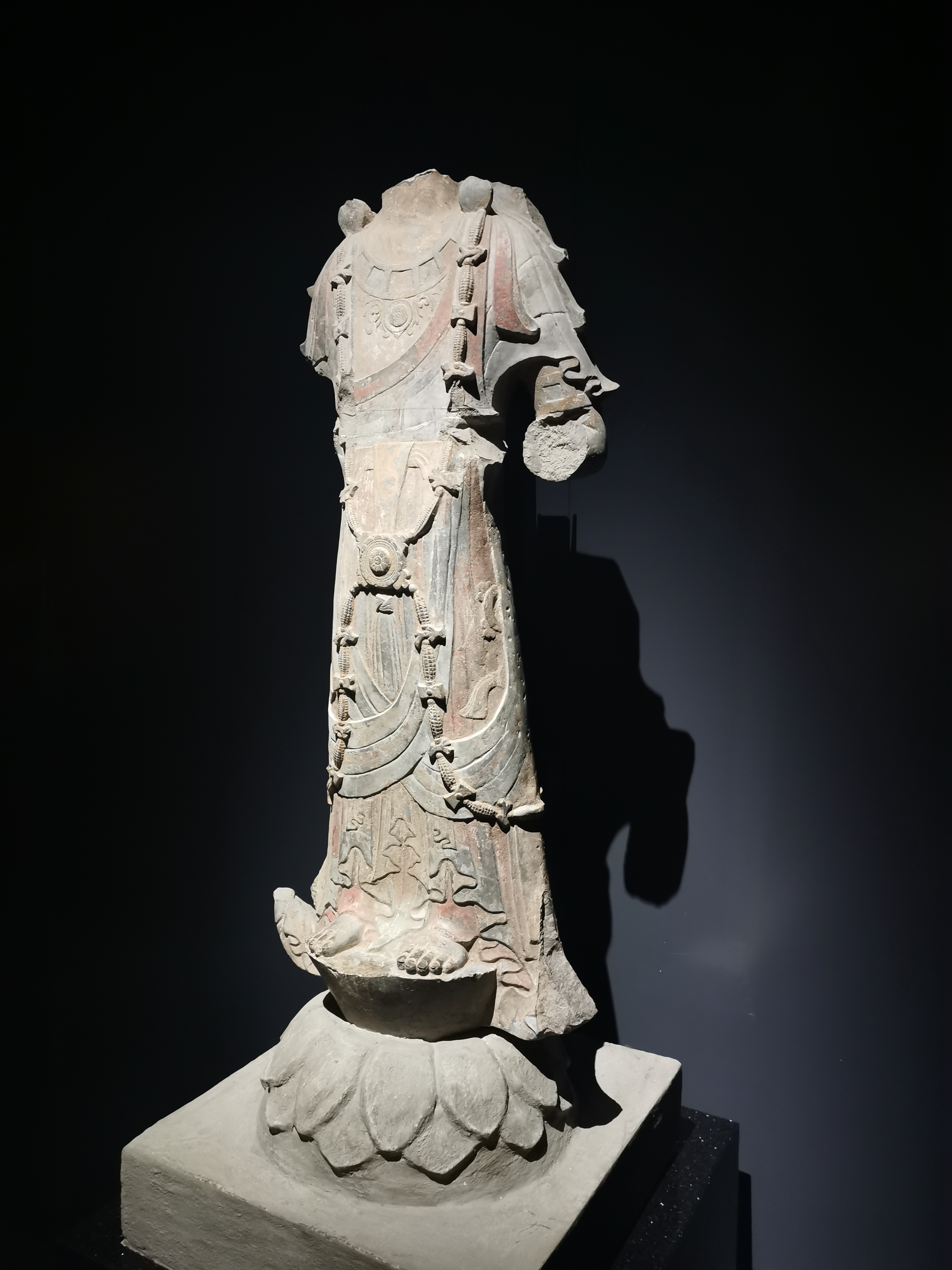

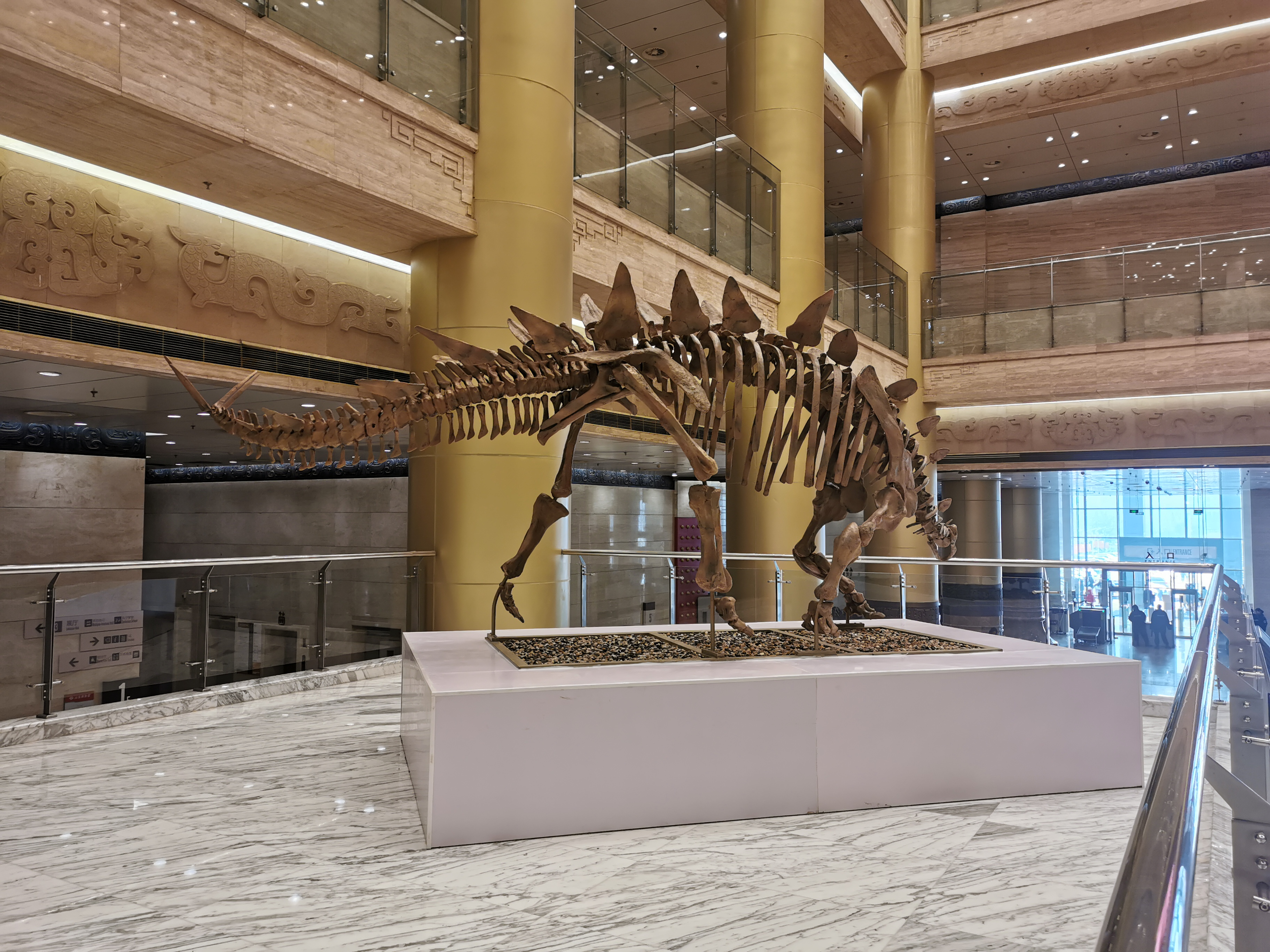

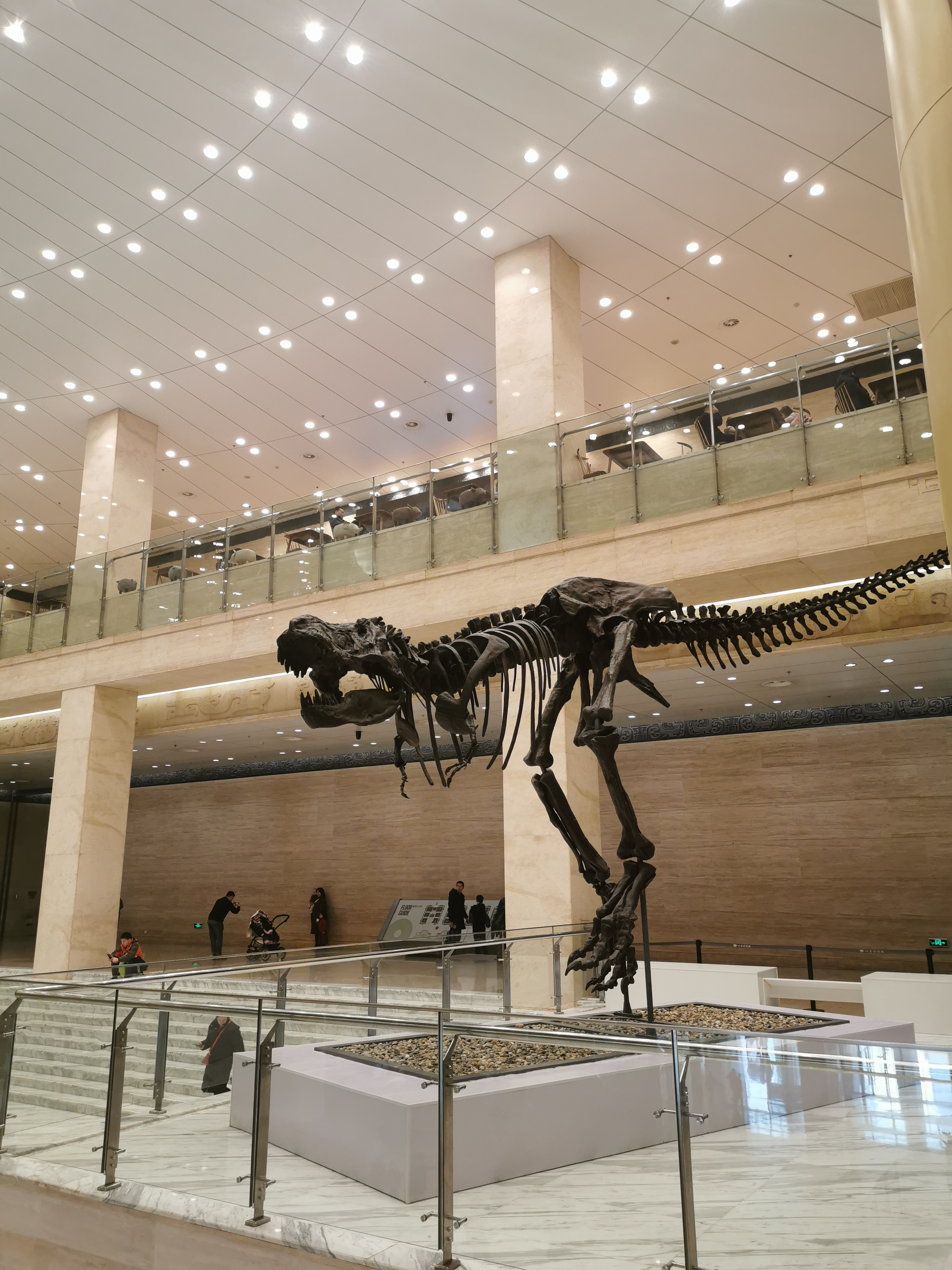

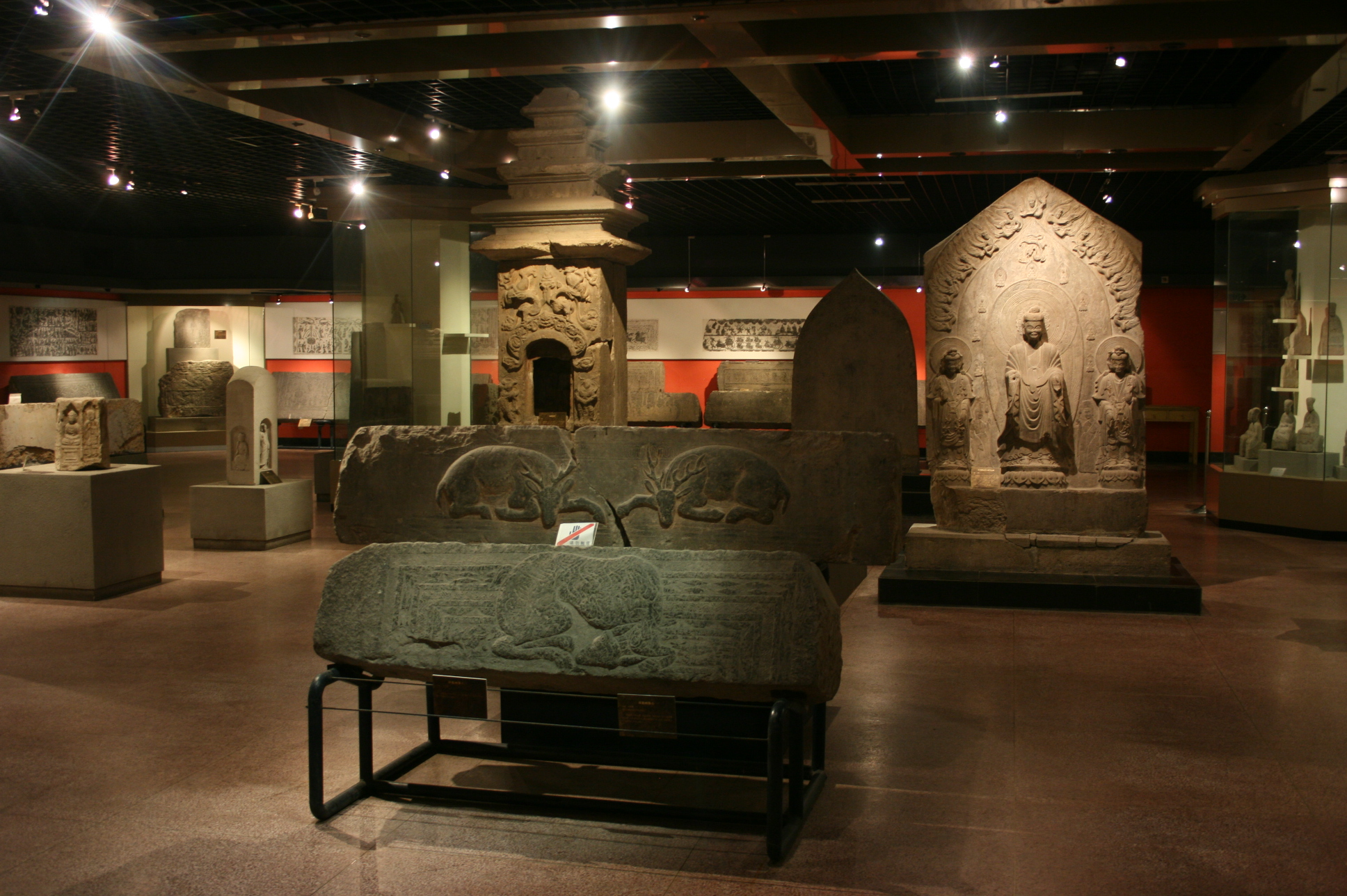

== See also ==
- List of museums in China
