= Songlin Academy =

Song Lin Academy (松林书院) was established in the period of Renzong in the Northern Song dynasty. At that time, it was called "Pinon Academy". After the reign of Zhengde of the Ming dynasty, the name was changed to the "Song Lin Academy". It became a part of Qing Zhou No. 1 High School in 1986. The Song Lin Academy is an historical building. During the Song dynasty, Renzong presented "The Four Books and Five Classics" to Qingzhou to study Confucianism to develop a talent for government. Since the Xianzong period in the Ming dynasty, Song Lin Academy was used to memory the 13 famous magistrates, including Fan Zhongyan.

== Current condition ==
Song Lin Academy is in the middle of the Qingzhou No. 1 High School. Currently, classes are not held in the Song Lin Academy, but some famous people's photos are exhibited in the main hall. Some pictures of Qing Zhou's mayor are exhibited in the south hall and some of the president of Qingzhou No. 1 High School are exhibited in the north hall.
