= Allan Jones =

Allan Jones may refer to:

- Allan Jones (actor) (1907–1992), American actor and singer, and the father of singer Jack Jones
- Allan Jones (cricketer) (born 1947), English cricket umpire and former cricketer
- Allan Jones (editor) (born 1951/52), British music journalist
- Allan Jones (engineer), British engineer, pioneer work on Combined Heat & Power systems
- Allan Jones (footballer, born 1940) (1940–1993), Welsh footballer who played as a defender
- Allan Jones (football coach) (born 1940), former New Zealand national football team manager
- Allan Jones (businessman) (born 1952), founder of Check Into Cash
- Allan Frewin Jones (born 1954), English writer

== See also ==
- Jones (surname)
- Alan Jones (disambiguation)
- Allen Jones (disambiguation)
- Alun Jones (disambiguation)
