= Guangzhi Yuan =

Historic building in Jinan, China

Coordinates: 36°39′22.25″N 117°0′46.91″E

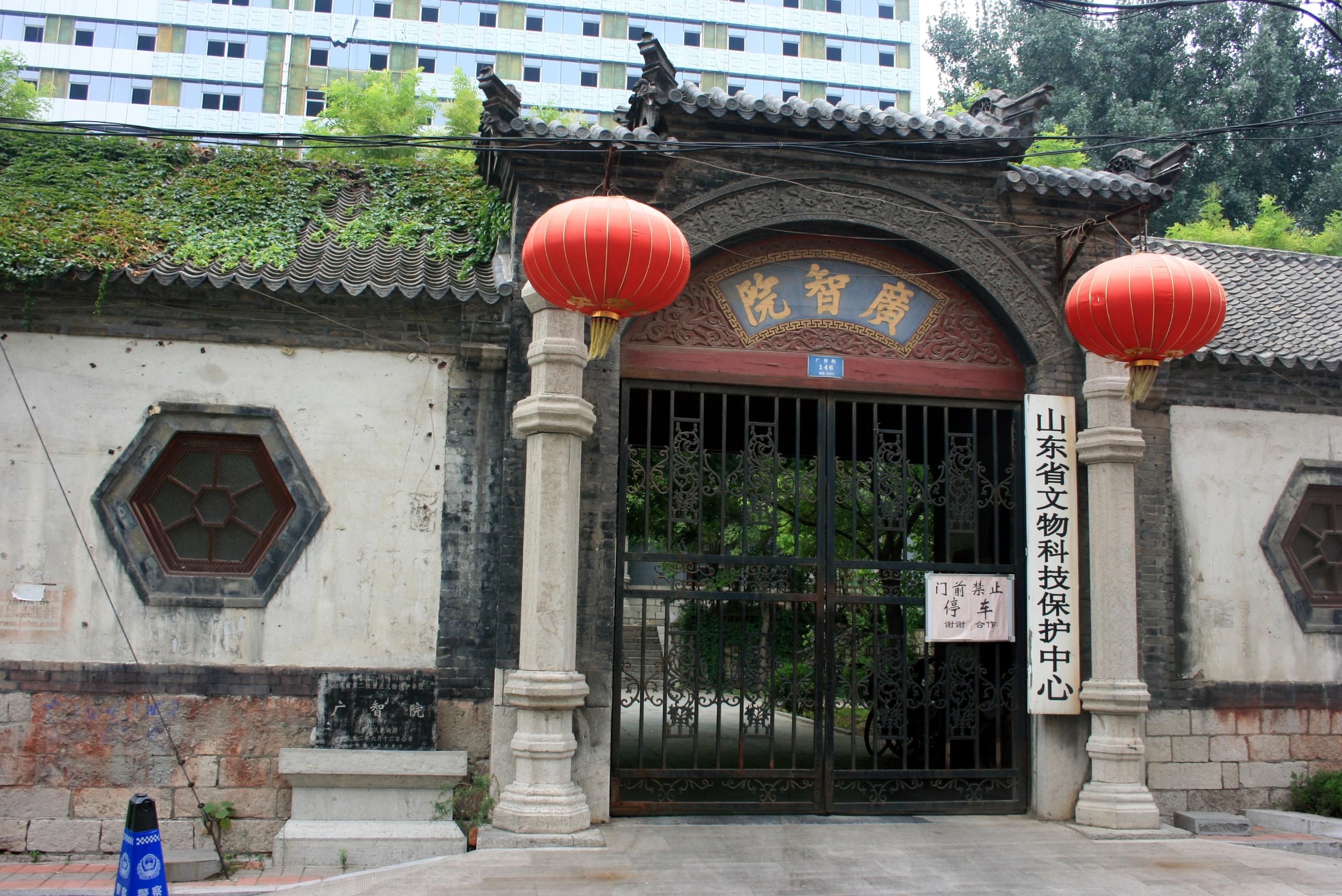
Entrance gate in 2009

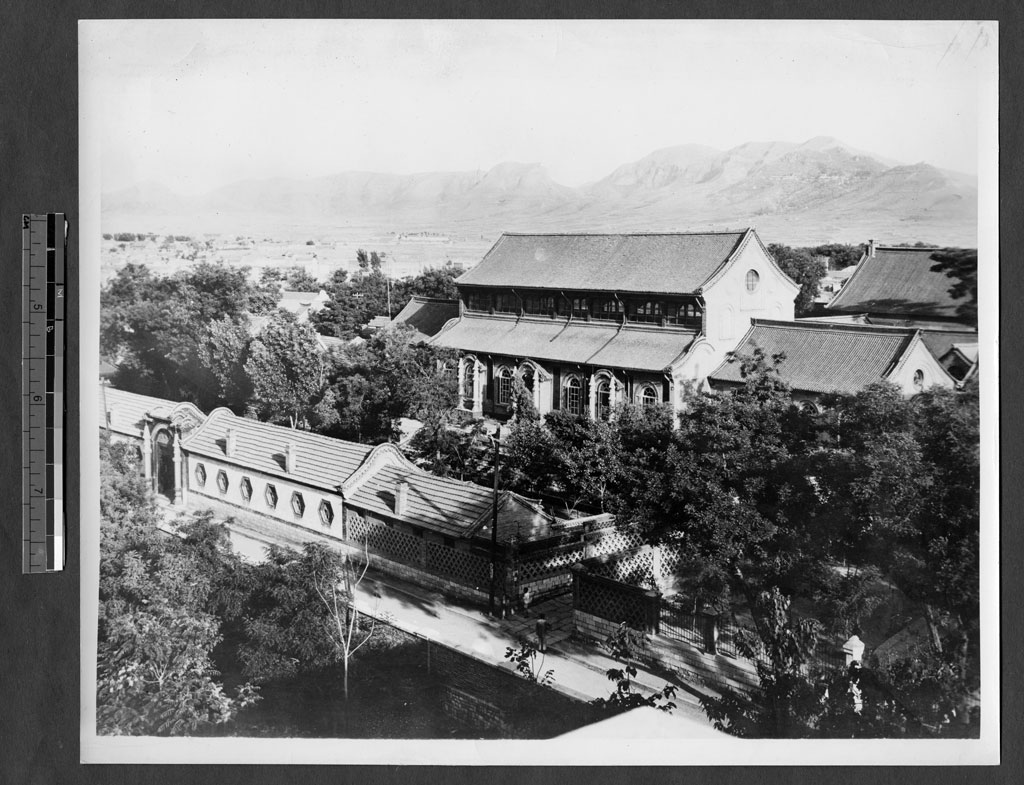
Whitewright Institute in 1947

The Guangzhi Yuan (simplified Chinese: 广智院; traditional Chinese: 廣智院; pinyin: Guǎngzhì Yuàn; lit. 'Academy of Broad Knowledge') is a historical building in the City of Jinan, Shandong Province, China. In the early 20th century, it housed a museum that was the forerunner of the Shandong Provincial Museum.

The Guangzhi Yuan is linked to Shandong's oldest museum, the Yidu Museum that was opened by the British Baptist missionary John Sutherland Whitewright in Qingzhou in 1887. The science history and exhibits of the Yidu Museum were relocated to Jinan in 1904 and renamed Guangzhi Yuan. Later, it was operated as the Whitewright Institute at Shantung Christian University.

The museum became quickly popular and attracted 102,000 visitors in the first four months after opening in Jinan. By 1912, the annual number of visitors had risen to 230,000 and by 1919 to 400,000.

The Guangzhi Yuan was reopened in 1956 as the Shandong Provincial Museum.

== See also ==
- List of sites in Jinan
