= Allen Jones =

Allen Jones may refer to:

- Allen Jones (Continental Congress) (1739–1798), Continental Congress delegate
- Allen Jones (artist) (born 1937), British pop artist
- Allen Jones (record producer) (1940–1987), American record producer
- AJ Styles (Allen Jones, born 1977), American professional wrestler
- Allen Jones (whistleblower), Pennsylvania whistleblower on the pharmaceutical industry

== See also ==
- Allan Jones (disambiguation)
- Alan Jones (disambiguation)
- Alun Jones (disambiguation)
- Al Jones (disambiguation)
- Jones (surname), a surname of Medieval English origins
- List of people with surname Jones
