= Alun Jones =

Alun Jones may refer to:

- Alun Jones (tennis) (born 1980), Australian tennis player
- Al Jones (English musician) (1945–2008), born Alun Jones, UK folk-rock musician
- Alun Gwynne Jones, Baron Chalfont (1919–2020), British politician
- Alun Ffred Jones (born 1959), Welsh politician
- Alun Wyn Jones (born 1985), Welsh rugby union player

== See also ==
- Alun Ashworth-Jones, a 1969 Parlophone album by Al Jones
- Alan Jones (disambiguation)
- Allan Jones (disambiguation)
- Allen Jones (disambiguation)
- Al Jones (disambiguation)
