= Allan Jones (engineer) =

British mechanical engineer

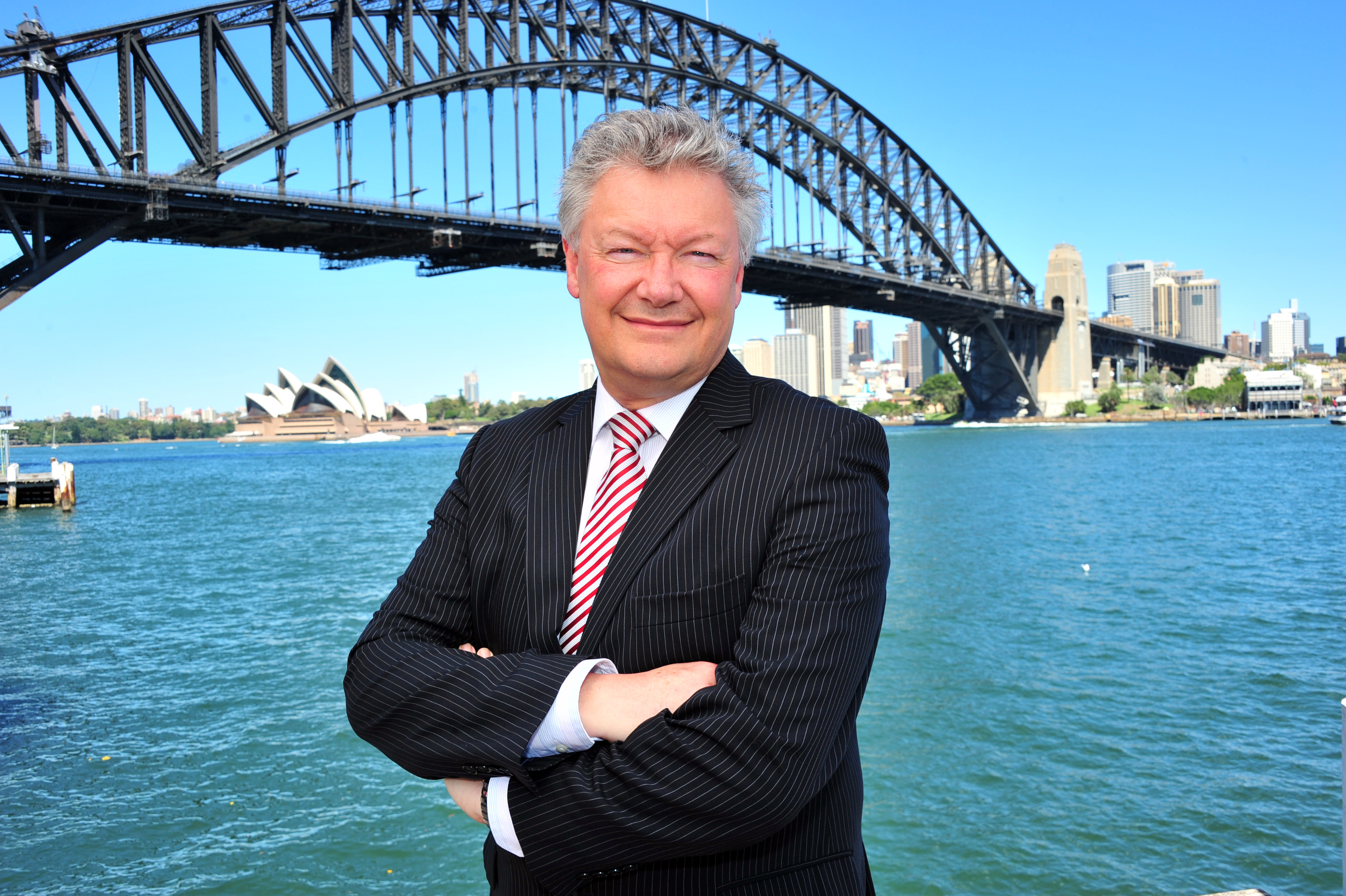
- Born: Dartford, United Kingdom
- Known for: CHP, energy and climate change work in Woking, London and Sydney Ecology
- Awards: MBE in the 1999 New Year's honours list for services to energy and water efficiency
- Scientific career
- Fields: Engineering, Combined Heat and Power systems (CHP), renewable energy, fuel cells and climate change
- Workplaces: City of Sydney

Allan Jones MBE, is an engineer who pioneered Combined Heat and Power (CHP), renewable energy and fuel cell systems in the United Kingdom and Australia from 1990 to the present.

== Allan Jones Energy and climate change ==
Jones attended Sheerwater secondary modern, Woking; Guildford College of Technology and the Central London Polytechnic. During his early career he spent 18 years with Greater London Council and Inner London Education Authority, working on major development and regeneration projects but is known for his energy and climate change work, particularly decentralised energy in Woking, London and Sydney.

In 1999, Jones was awarded an MBE in the New Year's honours list for services to energy and water efficiency.

Greater London Council/Inner London Education Authority

From 1971 to 1989 Jones worked for the Greater London Council (1971 to 1986) and the Inner London Education Authority (1986 to 1989) on major development and regeneration projects both as an engineer and senior manager, including London housing projects, Andover Town Development, County Hall projects, Burgess Park new lake and park, the first networked Building Energy Management System in the UK and various school and college projects. Jones was a member of the Department of Mechanical and Electrical Engineering Management Board from 1983 to 1986 and a member of the Department of Building and Property Services Management Board from 1986 to 1989.

Woking Borough Council

From 1989 to 2004 Jones worked for Woking Borough Council, initially as building services manager and then as energy services manager. He was instrumental in establishing the council's energy and environmental services company Thameswey Ltd of which he was a director (1999 to 2004) and its public/private joint venture company Thameswey Energy Ltd which developed and implemented decentralised energy projects in both the public and private sectors.

During his time at Woking, Jones reduced CO_{2} emissions by 77.5% from 1990 levels to 2004, improved the energy efficiency of the existing housing stock within its area by 30% from 1996 to 2004 and undertook groundbreaking work on energy and water efficiency, private wire CHP cogeneration and trigeneration decentralised energy systems, environmentally friendly waste recycling/recovery and energy from waste technologies, alternative fuels for transport, renewable energy and fuel cells. Under Jones, Woking installed 81 private wire decentralised energy systems, nearly 10% of the UK's total installed solar energy photovoltaics and the first fuel cell CHP in the UK. Woking was able to implement private wire networks under the UK's exempt licensing regime .

In 2001, Jones was instrumental in Woking being awarded a Queens Award for Enterprise: Sustainable Development for his work in the development of local sustainable community energy systems, the only local authority ever to receive a Queens Award for Enterprise.

London Climate Change Agency

In 2004, the then Mayor of London, Ken Livingstone recruited Jones to head up his new climate change agency for London as chief executive officer (2004 to 2008) of the London Climate Change Agency Ltd (LCCA), a municipal company that developed and implemented projects in the sectors that impact on climate change, especially in the energy, water, waste and transport sectors. In addition to being chief executive officer of the LCCA, Jones was also the LCCA's executive director of the London ESCO Ltd and the LCCA's director of the Better Buildings Partnership Ltd, a company limited by guarantee between the LCCA and major landlords in London to reduce CO_{2} emissions from major commercial and public buildings.

During his time in London Jones set up and ran the LCCA, developed the energy and climate change elements of the London Plan, Mayor's Climate Change Action Plan and the new Mayoral Climate Change Statutory Duty as well as developing and implementing decentralised energy and renewable energy projects in London. One of the key projects that Jones implemented was the procurement and establishment of the London ESCO, a public/private joint venture Energy Services Company between the LCCA Ltd and EDF Energy plc, which designs, finances, builds and operates decentralised energy systems for both new and existing development.

Jones is credited with the removal of the regulatory barriers to decentralised energy in the UK with the high level advocacy and lobbying that led to the creation of a separate electricity supply licence for decentralised energy or distributed generation to supply electricity over the local distribution network, otherwise known as the ‘virtual private wire’ over public wires principle. The UK Energy Regulator – the Office of Electricity and Gas Markets enacted the new licence in March 2009 .

On 22 May 2008, Jones appeared in an interview, shot in London and Woking, as part of the Australian ABC's Catalyst programme (2008 Episode 14). The story featured Jones past work in Woking and the LCCA's plans for implementing decentralised energy systems in London. This led to Jones being invited to visit Sydney as a guest of the City of Sydney and the New South Wales state government. A public talk ‘City Talk: Green Transformers, revolutionising energy generation for a Sustainable Sydney’ was held on Tuesday 22 July 2008 at the Theatre Royal, MLC Centre, King St, Sydney. The visit also included media coverage, like that on ABC Radio National's Saturday Extra programme.

Sustainable Environment Foundation

From 2007 to 2009 Jones was a director-trustee of the Sustainable Environment Foundation, a foundation that promotes for the benefit and advances the education of the public the conservation, protection and improvement of the physical and natural environment.

Allan Jones Energy and climate change

From 2008 to 2009 Jones worked as an energy and climate change consultant both in the UK and overseas, including working for the City of Sydney on a number of energy and climate change projects and advising on the delivery of the climate change targets in Sustainable Sydney 2030, in particular on trigeneration and other green infrastructure.

=== City of Sydney ===
In 2009, Jones was appointed as chief development officer, energy and climate change by the City of Sydney to provide leadership, strategic direction and high level advocacy to promote the changes which support the development and delivery of green infrastructure within the city as set out in Sustainable Sydney 2030. Sydney has an ambitious target to reduce CO_{2} emissions by 70% by 2030 from 2006 levels which will require at least 330 MWe of combined cooling, heat and power (CCHP) or trigeneration to deliver 70% of the city's electricity requirements by 2030 with the remainder coming from local renewable energy.

To deliver these targets Jones developed a green infrastructure plan for the city, which is being put into action at two levels: for the city as a whole and by the City of Sydney leading the way and installing local generation and green infrastructure projects in its own operations. This "show by doing" principle had been previously adopted in Woking and London to demonstrate that if the public sector leads, others will follow.

At the first level, decentralised energy master plans, trigeneration, renewable energy and Advanced Waste Treatment, Decentralised Water and Automated Waste Master Plans are being developed to create a citywide green infrastructure plan which will be embedded into the city's master plan and operations.

At the second level, the city is implementing a range of projects to reduce its own CO_{2} emissions by 48% from 2009 to 2012 as a first step towards the city's own 70% reduction in CO_{2} emissions target for its own buildings and operations. This has led to a series of building energy efficiency retrofit and renewable energy projects which have already seen an 18% reduction in CO_{2} emissions in the first year of the project.

At the second level, the city has already reduced greenhouse gas emissions in its buildings by 18% from 2009 to 2011 by building energy efficiency retrofits and has let a further building energy and water efficiency retrofit contract to reduce emissions by a further 24%, increasing the total emission reductions to 42% by the end of 2012. The city has also let contracts to replace all city-owned street lighting with LEDs over the next three years which will reduce emissions in city-owned street lighting by 51% and to install 1.25 MWp of precinct scale solar photovoltaics on more than 30 of the city's buildings over the next two years.

Following completion of the two-year-long procurement process Cogent Energy (owned by Origin Energy) was appointed by Sydney as the energy services provider to design, finance, build, operate and maintain the citywide trigeneration network. Heads of agreement were signed in April 2012 and the development agreement was executed in August 2012.
