= Tuoshan =

Mountain in Shandong, China

Coordinates: 36°38′54.9″N 118°27′27.5″E

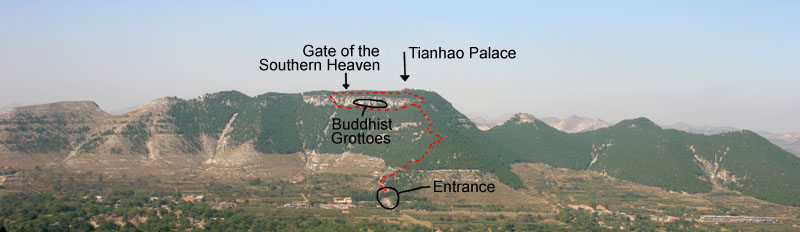
Map of the mountain as seen from adjacent Cloud Gate Mountain

Tuoshan (Chinese: 驼山; pinyin: Tuó Shān; lit. 'Camel Mountain') is a mountain located 4 km (2 mi) south-west of Qingzhou city, Shandong province, China. It features a number of historic sites and a native pine forest. Tuoshan is the core scenic zone of Qingzhou National Park.

== Qiaoyu's Calligraphy ==
Qiaoyu was a chief official of Qingzhou during the Ming dynasty, and inscribed the characters 'Tuo Shan' on the eastern face of the mountain.

== Haotian Temple ==
Haotian Temple (Hao Tian Gong in pinyin) measures 150 m from north to south and 100 m from east to west. It lies on the summit of Tuoshan, and commands a view northward to Qingzhou. The temple itself consists of a group of ancient structures, including an old theatre, Yuhuang Palace, Seven Treasures Cabinet, and a garden of stone 'stelae' or tablets. A tablet on the site records the rebuilding of the temple in the Yuan dynasty (1271–1368). The temple has undergone further repairs since 1986.

=== Yuhuang Palace ===
This building is part of Haotian Temple on the summit of the mountain.

=== Qibao Cabinet ===
Seven Treasures (Qi bao) Cabinet was built in the Yuan dynasty. It is a non-beam, double-arched stone structure and is rare in China.

== River in the Sky ==
Tian He. Adjacent to Haotian Temple. It was completely dry as of 2004 and it is doubtful that it ever 'flows'. A more realistic translation might be 'pool' or 'pond'.

== Bridge in the Sky ==
Tian Qiao. The bridge crosses the 'River in the Sky', and provides an entrance to Haotian Temple.

== Heavenly Spring ==
Tian Quan. Possibly another name for the 'River in the Sky'.

== Wulong Pool ==
Possibly another name for the 'River in the Sky'.

== Gate of the Southern Heaven ==
Tian Nan Men in pinyin. A recently constructed or reconstructed Chinese gateway atop mountain.

== Buddhist Grottoes ==
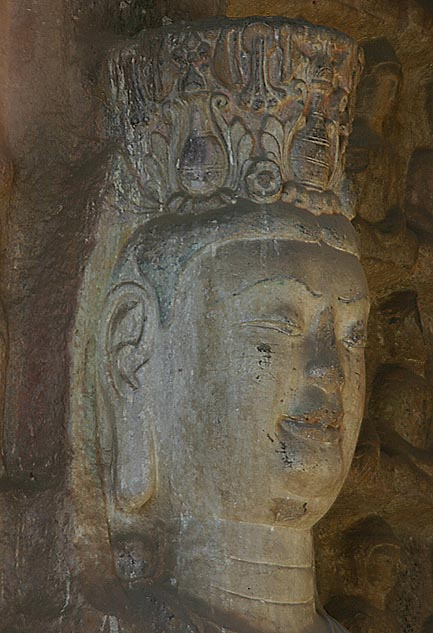
Detail of the head of an attendant Boddhisattva figure.

There are 638 stone Buddhas in five main grottoes, which were chiselled in the Northern Zhou (577–581) and Tang dynasty (613–907) and lie along the mountain's eastern edge, close to the summit. All of the smaller grottoes are now empty. The main grottoes are mostly intact with the exception of many of the smaller-Buddha's heads. They are protected by cages. The tallest statue, that of a seated Buddha, still survives. It is over 7 m high, making it the largest in the province. The smallest statues at the site are about 10 cm (4 in) tall. The site was placed under national protection in 1988.

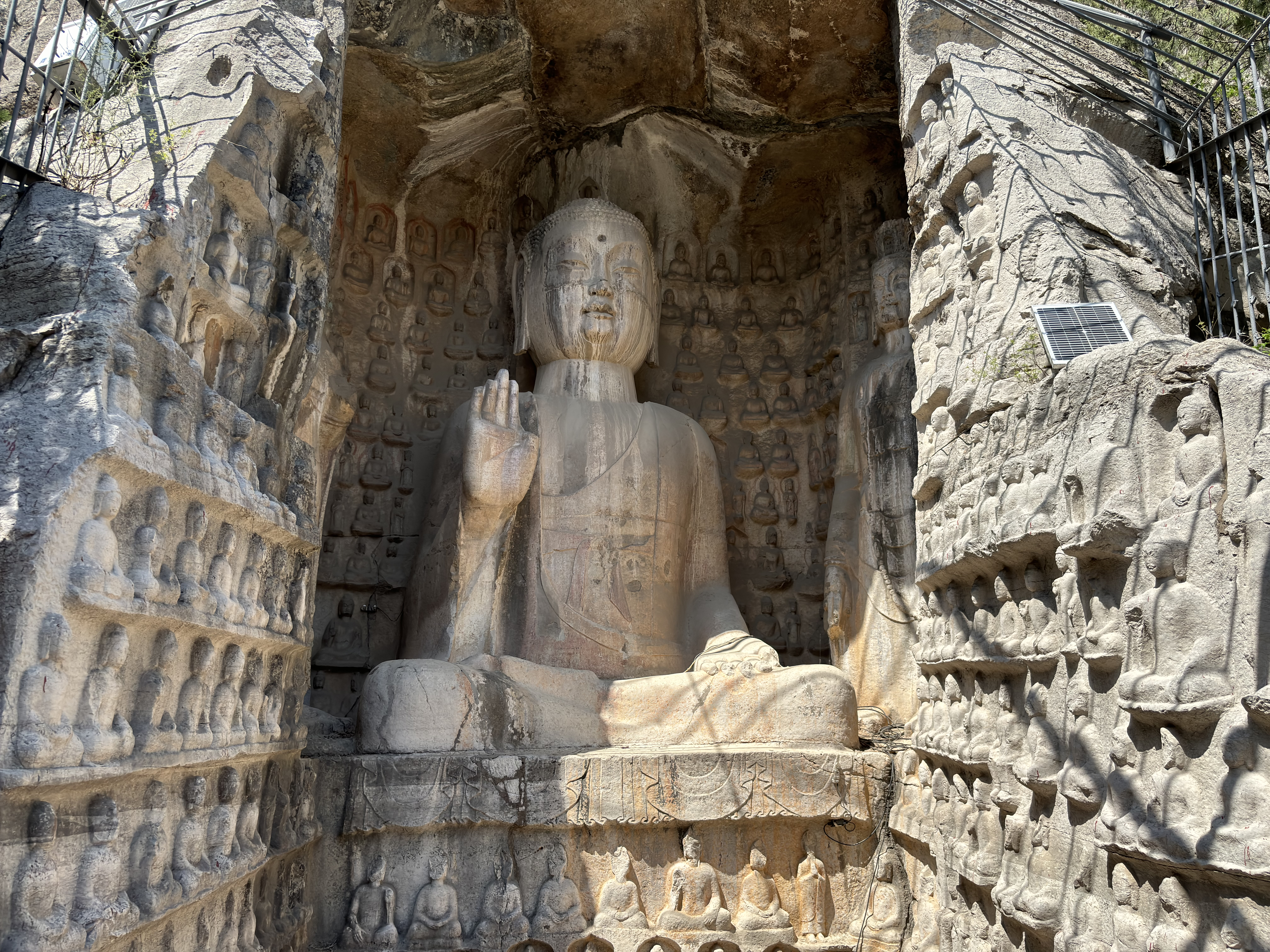
