= Alan A. Jones =

American professor of chemistry

- Occupations: Mathematician, scholar
- Known for: Contributions to theology and mathematics

Alan Anthony Jones (1944 in Jamestown, NY – May 23, 2006) was an American professor of chemistry at Clark University in Worcester, Massachusetts. During his more than thirty years at Clark he served as a mentor and advisor to hundreds of undergraduate, graduate and post-doctoral students. He was a leading researcher in the field of NMR and polymer physics. His research focused on solid state NMR spectroscopy of polymer systems. This work was supported for many years through grants from agencies such as the National Science Foundation, Petroleum Research Fund and the Army Research Office.

He attended Colgate University and received his B.A. in 1966. He earned a Ph.D. in Chemistry at the University of Wisconsin–Madison in 1972 and worked at Clark after working as a postdoctoral fellow at Dartmouth College under Walter H. Stockmayer from 1972-74. At Clark, Jones and fellow professor Paul Inglefield built an NMR facility at the university and wrote over 100 research papers. Some of Jones' ideas led to new ideas for the use of NMR in studying polymer systems, such as his highly cited 1977 paper: Models for spin relaxation in dilute solutions of randomly coiled polymers.

As a professor at Clark Dr. Jones was noted as one of the best professors and he received the institution’s Outstanding Teacher Award in 1988. During his tenure, more than twenty graduate students in his research group earned their Ph.D. degrees. He also served in the administration at Clark, first at Acting Provost (1987–1988) and later as Dean of Graduate Studies and Research (1993–1995).

Jones died unexpectedly on May 23, 2006. Before his death, Jones had been researching synthetic polymers that would be suitable membranes for use in chemical separations, fuel cells and solid electrolytes. He used PFG NMR to follow the diffusion of small molecules or ions and determine their self-diffusion coefficient. Diffusion in these systems was observed to be enhanced by up to an order of magnitude by the addition of nanoparticles and the mechanism for this enhancement was under investigation at the time of his death.

== Notable publications ==
- Guoxing Lin and Alan A. Jones, “A Lattice Model for the Simulation of One and Two Dimensional 129Xe Line Shape Collapse by Translational Diffusion,” Solid State NMR 2004, 26, 87-98..
- Jinghui Zhang 1, Marcus V. Giotto, Wen-Yang Wen, Alan A. Jones, “An NMR Study of the State of Ions and Diffusion in Perfluorosulfonate Ionomer,” Journal of Membrane Science 269, 118 (2006).
- Ernest Krygier, Guoxing Lin, Jessica Mendes, Gatambwa Mukandela, David Azar and Alan A. Jones, Jai A. Pathak, Ralph H. Colby Sanat K. Kumar, George Floudas, R. Krishnamoorti, “Segmental Dynamics of Head-to-Head Polypropylene and Polyisobutylene in their Blend and Pure Components,” Macromolecules 38, 7721 (2005).
- Haihui Cao, Guoxing Lin, Alan A. Jones “Deuterium Solid Echo Line Shape Study of Poly(ethylene oxide) Dynamics in a Blend with Poly(methyl methacrylate),” Journal of Polymer Science, Polymer Physics Edition 43, 2433 (2005).
- Junyan Zhong, Wen-Yang Wen and Alan A. Jones, “Translational and Rotational Motion of Cyclohexane in an Ultrapermeable Nanocomposite Membrane of Poly(2,2-bis(trifluoromethyl)-4,5-difluoro-1,3-dioxole-co-tetrafluoroethylene) and Fumed Silica,” Macromolecules.
- Jones, A.A.; Stockmayer, W.H. "Models for spin relaxation in dilute solutions of randomly coiled polymers" J Polym Sci Polym Phys Ed 1977, B15, 847).
