= Reform of the administrative divisions of China =

In recent years there have been calls to reform the administrative divisions and levels of China, which is defined either the People's Republic of China (PRC; China) or the Republic of China (ROC; Taiwan).

The abolishment of district public offices is an ongoing reform to remove an extra level of administration from between the county and township levels. There have also been calls to abolish the prefecture level, and some provinces have transferred some of the power prefectures currently hold to the counties they govern. There are also calls to reduce the size of the provinces. The ultimate goal is to reduce the different administration levels from five to three, (Provincial, County, Village) reducing the amount of corruption that goes on in between and reducing the number of government workers to reduce budget. One of the most recent examples that took place in 1998 when the government of the Republic of China, which amended its constitution, reduced the powers of its remaining two of 35 provinces and transferred its responsibilities to the city and county governments. The Executive Yuan defunded the remaining provincial governments in 2018.

Although actual proposals differ in their details, many of the proposals contain the following points:

== Redrawing the provinces ==
The current province boundaries of China were mostly drawn during the Yuan, Ming, and Qing dynasties, and are criticized by some as relics of a divide and rule policy that prevailed during those times. Current provinces frequently transcend major cultural and geographical divides, encompassing areas that have little in common. On the other hand, many cultural blocs, such as the Yangtze delta, the Huai watershed, or the Hakka lands, are divided along boundaries that do not actually indicate any geographical or cultural divide. Proponents for redrawing province boundaries believe that boundaries should be redrawn to better reflect cultural and geographical divides, which would in turn help to reduce conflict within provinces, promote regional cooperation, and increase administrative efficiency.

Opponents of this, on the other hand, point to the fact that despite disparities within provinces, these boundaries have remained more or less stable for many centuries, and form an important part of identity for all Chinese. Opponents also doubt whether realigning province borders to cultural boundaries would really help in promoting regional cooperation, or simply lead to increasing regionalism.

== Making the provinces smaller ==
Proponents point to the size of current provinces, such as Henan, Shandong, and Sichuan, all of which have populations of close to 100 million people. It is said that such enormous size puts a staggering burden on provincial governments, resulting in inefficiency and poor responsiveness to grassroots needs and desires, as well as inability to concentrate on specific areas of development. In addition, some proponents of province shrinking believe that the current size of larger provinces has given them too much bargaining power with the central government, and is a negative influence on the territorial integrity of China.

Opponents of province shrinking believe that increasing the number of provinces would simply increase the inefficiency of governmental bureaucracy. They also believe that smaller provinces would make the coordination of pan-regional efforts more difficult and, consequently, affect economic development. Moreover, they believe that current provinces are important parts of identity for individual Chinese and should not be tampered with.

A variation on this theme is a call to increase the number of municipalities by carving major cities out of the provinces, which would basically achieve the same effect. The recent establishment of Hainan province (out of Guangdong) and Chongqing municipality (out of Sichuan) can be seen as experiments along this vein. Proposals have been made for the municipality status of cities such as Guangzhou, Nanjing, Wuhan, and Chengdu.

== Abolishing the prefecture level ==
This proposal has recently gathered quite a lot of popularity. The reasons are based on the history of prefectures.

By the constitution of China, provinces are supposed to govern counties directly—and prefectures (autonomous ones excepted) are neither mentioned nor endorsed. So when prefectures were originally being set up, they were an unofficial quasi-level to help provinces govern very large numbers of counties. As a result, prefectures are (unlike provinces or counties) often seen as nothing more than bureaucratic institutions.

However, the constitution does allow for some cities, which are a constitutionally guaranteed level of administration, to be "prefecture-level" (in the sense that they can take surrounding counties under them), though the original intention was likely to have just a few very large cities in each province be prefecture-level cities that govern only the counties in their immediate suburbs. The rest of each province would still consist of counties under unofficial prefectures. (This was, in fact, the general situation before the 90's.)

In recent years, however, there has been a trend to replace prefectures wholesale with prefecture-level cities. This takes advantage of the ambiguous wording in the constitution, and basically turns unofficial prefectures overnight into official levels endorsed in the constitution. This process took place very fast—most provinces now govern all or most of their counties through only prefecture-level cities. In other words, an extra level of government has been "inserted" into the administrative structure.

Proponents of reform say that this twist in events undermines the entire administrative structure of China by "sneaking in" an extra level "out of nowhere". More levels, they argue, lead to more corruption, more government spending, more inefficiency and idleness, and greater distance between the grassroots and the government. In addition, they claim that this arrangement over-emphasizes prefecture capitals (now they can claim, nominally and legally, to "be" the entire prefecture), and they argue that this has given prefectures license to sap resources that would otherwise go directly to counties. This in turn accentuates regional conflicts and the rich-poor gap. Also, if provinces are shrunk as well (see the proposal above), then there is even less need left for any prefectures at all to exist—after all, they only exist because provinces are too large.

(Autonomous prefectures, which are guaranteed in the constitution, are mostly exempted from such proposals.)

Opponents of this change believe that it is unrealistic to expect any change to come to current provincial boundaries, and hence prefectures are here to stay, at least in the short term. Moreover, they claim that the sheer size of provinces (which, according to them, do not need to be shrunk) means that prefectures are needed as an intermediary level. Finally, they defend the establishment of prefecture-level cities by arguing that it helps in encouraging urbanization, and cooperative development of entire regions.

Hainan and Chongqing, already mentioned above as apparent experiments in province shrinking, can also be seen as experiments in the abolishment of prefectures. Hainan has two prefecture-level cities, but those control only districts (i.e. their own urbanized area); all the counties of Hainan are under the direct charge of the province, with no prefecture-level intermediary. Chongqing, which is province-sized (despite its status as a municipality), has no intermediate prefecture-level subdivisions of any sort.

In addition, the provinces of Zhejiang, Fujian, Hubei, and Henan have initiated a number of reforms, giving counties a wide range of rights currently held by prefectures.

== Increasing the size of counties and townships ==
The abolishment of district public offices is part of this reform; originally set up as an intermediate level to help counties deal with very large numbers of towns and township, they are now being phased out, and towns and townships are being enlarged to partially fill their place. In effect, this reform is already being carried out in most parts of the country. In addition, there are proposals to merge smaller counties as well.

Proponents of this believe that the sheer size of the Chinese bureaucracy (and hence, the sheer amount of resources that it consumes) is due to the extraordinary number of counties and townships—and they believe that the number can be reduced.

Opponents of this believe that the population density of China means that tiny counties and townships are needed for effective government. They also claim that any drastic change to grassroots-level government would have adverse effects on social stability.

== Bypassing the provincial hierarchy ==
Another reform is to have certain institutions of the central government form institutions which completely bypass the number provincial hierarchies. The model for this is federal institutions of the United States of America and the purpose is to prevent provincial and local interference in some functions of the central government. The Military Area Commands of the People's Liberation Army have long been administered in this fashion precisely to prevent local officials from exercising control and influence over the military. One recent example of this reform has been the People's Bank of China which in 1999 abolished all provincial and local branches creating regional districts which do not correspond to provincial boundaries. A similar reform has been suggested for the judicial system creating circuit and district courts which do not correspond to provincial boundaries to reduce corruption and government payroll.

== See also ==
- Administrative divisions of China
