= Albert C. Jones =

American politician (1944–2024)

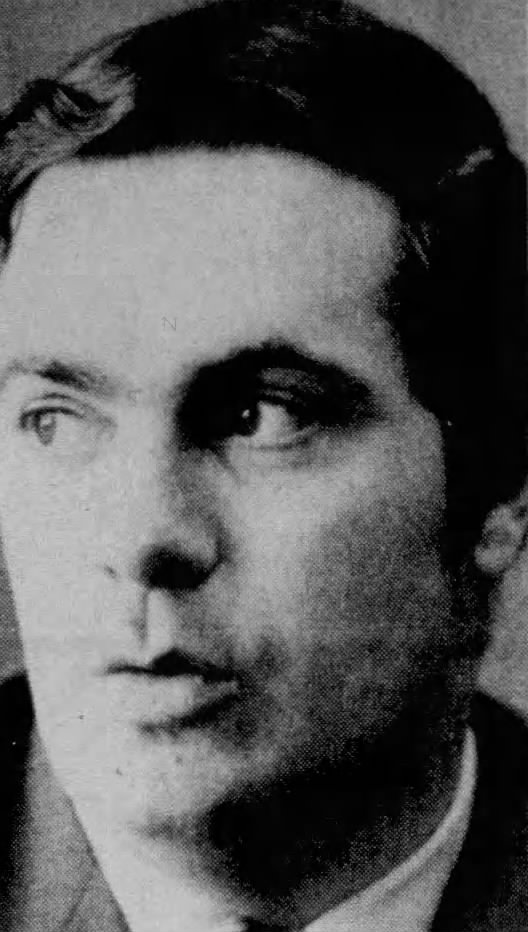
- Jones in 1974

Member of the New Hampshire House of Representatives from the Grafton 8th district
- In office 1972–1976

Personal details
- Born: September 3, 1944
- Died: May 13, 2024 (aged 79)
- Party: Democratic; Republican
- Education: Dartmouth College

Albert C. Jones (September 3, 1944 – May 13, 2024) was an American politician. He served as a member for the Grafton 8th district of the New Hampshire House of Representatives.

== Life and career ==
Jones graduated from Lebanon High School and Dartmouth College.

Jones served in the New Hampshire House of Representatives from 1972 to 1976.

Jones died on May 13, 2024, at the age of 79.
