= Albert Beckford Jones =

American businessman

- Born: 1958 (age 67–68); Columbus, Ohio
- Education: University of Chicago; University of Wisconsin Milwaukee (UWM); Alfred P. Sloan Foundation Fellow - Harvard University
- Occupation: Special Advisor for American Association for the Advancement of Science (AAAS) Research Competitiveness Program (RCP)
- Spouse: Married
- Children: 1
- Website: GoInternationally

Albert Beckford Jones (born 1958) is an American executive, entrepreneur, special advisor for the American Association for the Advancement of Science (AAAS) Research Competitiveness Program (RCP), and trustee/CEO to several international boards.

== Career ==
Jones has served as an advisor and interlocutor to a variety of U.S. domestic and international organizations doing business with foreign entities. He is currently serving as special advisor to the American Association for the Advancement of Science for the American Association for the Advancement of Science (AAAS) Research Competitiveness Program (RCP). AAAS is an American international nonprofit organization and the world's largest general scientific society. Its Research Competitiveness Program (RCP) provides expert peer review and guidance to academia, industry, foundations, and government agencies engaged in scientific research, development and innovation in the US and around the world. In 2008 Jones served as a special advisor to CRDF, the U.S. Civilian Research & Development Foundation, a non-profit authorized by the United States Congress to “promote peace and prosperity through international science collaboration.” In 1995 the CRDF was established by the U.S. government agency The National Science Foundation. Prior to CDRF Jones held executive positions in Fortune 500 companies Bank One, BP, Key Bank, Merrill Lynch and GM. Jones is founder and Chairman Emeritus of TC International and an Alfred P. Sloan Foundation Fellow.

== Education and distinctions ==
Jones received Alfred P. Sloan Foundation fellowship awards from both Harvard and the University of Chicago. He has two master's degrees, one from the University of Wisconsin–Milwaukee and a second from the University of Chicago where Jones was President of the student body and keynote speaker for inauguration of chancellor. Jones has also been a speaker for the Jeddah Economic Forum, a Middle East-based think tank with a roster of famous speakers.

== Boards ==
Jones is on several boards representing public interest including the Hampshire College Board of Trustees; the National Council of International Programs USA Board of Trustees and chairman of the board for National Public Policy International Affairs Board of Trustees
