= Private wire =

Localised electricity grid

Private wire systems are localised electricity grids connected to the local distribution networks but linked to privately owned central plant which produces electricity. This enables them to operate a stand-alone supply in the event of the national grid failing, providing localised energy security. The business case for private wire supply is driven by the fact that off-grid generation generally avoids network charges and statutory costs. Ofgem's "Significant Code Review" in the UK, launched in August 2017, includes private wire supplies within its scope.
