= Alan Jones (Australian cricketer) =

Australian cricketer (born 1948)

Personal information
- Born: 11 June 1948 (age 78); Greenslopes, Queensland, Australia
- Source: Cricinfo, 3 October 2020

Alan Jones (born 11 June 1948) is an Australian cricketer. He played in nineteen first-class and seven List A matches for Queensland between 1970 and 1977.

== See also ==
- List of Queensland first-class cricketers
