= Alan Wayne Jones =

Welsh toxicologist (born 1945)

Alan Wayne Jones (born 7 October 1945) is a researcher and scholarly writer on the subject of forensic toxicology and human physiology relating to alcohol consumption. Jones was born in Pontypridd, Wales, UK, but worked for most of his career in Sweden.

== Career ==
Jones received his PhD in chemistry from the University of Wales (Cardiff) in 1974, and has been active in biological alcohol research as well as in forensic toxicology since that time. In 1993, he was awarded a senior doctorate degree (DSc) by the University of Wales for his body of published work dealing with forensic aspects of alcohol and other drugs of abuse.

Jones recently retired from his position as senior scientist at the Division of Forensic Genetics and Forensic Chemistry at the Swedish National Board of Forensic Medicine, which is located in the town of Linköping, Sweden. Jones also serves as guest professor in Forensic Toxicology at the University of Health Sciences (Department of Clinical Pharmacology) of the University of Linköping.

He has published over 353 scientific articles with over 8000 citations and an h-index of 50, according to Scopus.

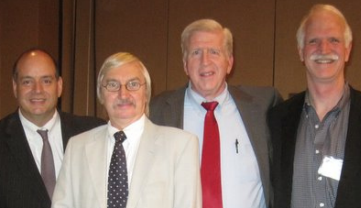
Dr. A W Jones

== Recognition ==
In 2004, the Alcohol, Drugs and Impairment Division of the US National Safety Council gave Jones their Robert F. Borkenstein Award for work on the relation between alcohol and drug use and transportation safety. In 2011 the International Association of Forensic Toxicologists gave Jones their Alan Curry Award, the association's "most prestigious award", for distinguished contributions to forensic toxicology. Jones was the 2017 winner of the Dr. Kurt M. Dubowski Award, given by the International Association for Chemical Testing for lifetime achievement in chemical testing for transportation or workplace safety.

== Selected publications ==
- 293 citations: Interpreting results of ethanol analysis in postmortem specimens: a review of the literature. FC Kugelberg, AW Jones. Forensic science international 165 (1), 10–29.
- 254 citations: Laboratory testing for recent alcohol consumption: comparison of ethanol, methanol, and 5-hydroxytryptophol. A Helander, O Beck, AW Jones. Clinical chemistry 42 (4), 618–624.
- 251 citations: Role of variability in explaining ethanol pharmacokinetics. Å Norberg, AW Jones, RG Hahn, JL Gabrielsson. Clinical pharmacokinetics 42 (1), 1-31.

== Books edited ==
- Alcohol, drugs, and impaired driving : forensic science and law enforcement issues.
