= Alf Jones (footballer, born 1937) =

English footballer

Personal information
- Full name: Alfred Jones
- Date of birth: 2 March 1937
- Place of birth: Liverpool, England
- Date of death: 1 October 2024
- Place of death: Wigan, England
- Height: 5 ft 8 in (1.73 m)
- Position: Full back

Senior career*
Years	Team	Apps	(Gls)
19??–1960	Marine		
1960–1962	Leeds United	25	(0)
1962–1967	Lincoln City	180	(3)
1967–1968	Wigan Athletic	28	(0)
1968–19??	Horwich RMI		
- * Club domestic league appearances and goals

Alfred Jones (born 2 March 1937) is an English former professional footballer who made 205 appearances in the Football League playing for Leeds United and Lincoln City. He played as a full back.

== Life and career ==
Jones was born in Liverpool. He played football as an amateur with Lancashire Combination club Marine until signing for Football League Second Division club Leeds United in 1960, initially as an amateur while completing his national service in the Royal Army Medical Corps. Jones made 24 appearances in league and cups in his first season, but in the face of stiff competition at full-back the following year, he only played five games, and joined Lincoln City, newly relegated to the Fourth Division, in June 1962 for a £4,000 fee.

He was a regular in the starting eleven for five years, making exactly 200 appearances in senior competitions. He left the club in 1967, and moved back to Lancashire, where he worked in a car factory and played non-league football for Wigan Athletic, where he made 28 league appearances without scoring, and Horwich RMI.
