= Alf Jones (Australian footballer) =

Australian rules footballer

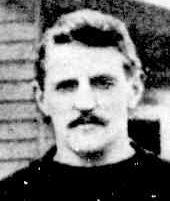

Personal information
- Full name: Alfred Ernest Jones
- Born: 27 May 1885; Geelong, Victoria
- Died: 19 February 1929 (aged 43); Malvern East, Victoria
- Original team: Port Rovers
- Height: 180 cm (5 ft 11 in)
- Position: Forward

Playing career^{1}
Years	Club	Games (Goals)
1908–1909	Melbourne	24 (18)
- ^{1} Playing statistics correct to the end of 1909.

Alfred Ernest Jones (27 May 1885 – 19 February 1929) was an Australian rules footballer who played for the Melbourne Football Club in the Victorian Football League (VFL). Midway through 1910 he was cleared to Brighton in the Victorian Football Association (VFA).
