= Alan Jones (footballer, born 1939) =

Welsh footballer

Personal information
- Full name: John Alan Jones
- Date of birth: 12 September 1939 (age 87)
- Place of birth: Wrexham, Wales
- Position: Goalkeeper

Senior career*
Years	Team	Apps	(Gls)
- Druids United
1957–1959	Cardiff City	1	(0)
1959–1962	Exeter City	90	(0)
1962–1963	Norwich City	9	(0)
1963–1964	Wrexham	18	(0)
- Pan-Hellenic
- * Club domestic league appearances and goals

John Alan Jones (born 12 September 1939) is a Welsh former professional footballer who played as a goalkeeper. He played in the English football league for Cardiff City, Exeter City, Norwich and Wrexham.
