= Alfred G. Jones =

Alfred George Jones
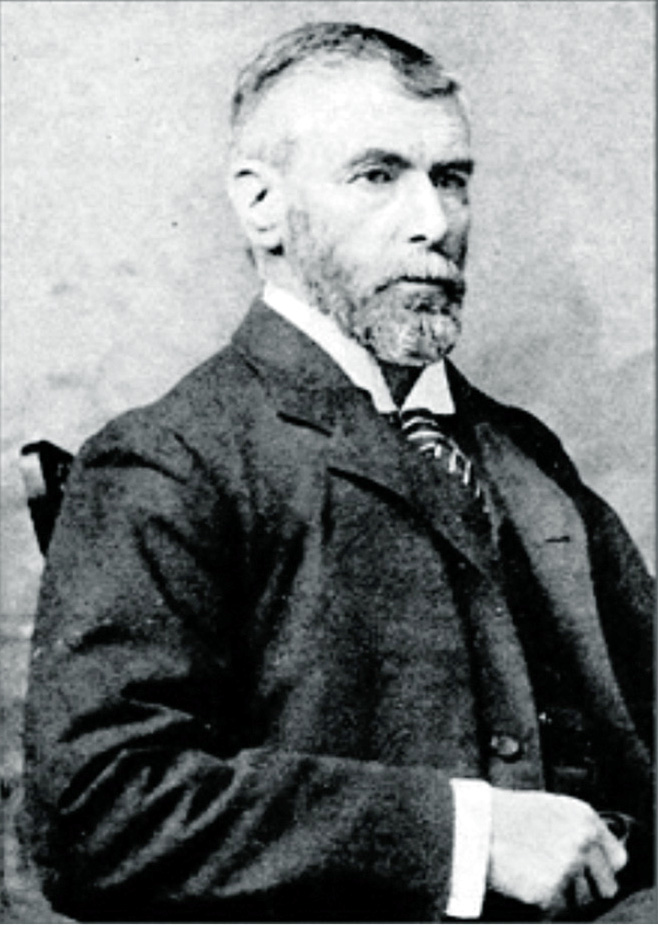
- Born: 23 July 1846; New Ross, Ireland
- Died: 17 July 1905 (aged 58); Tai'an, China
- Occupation: missionary,
- Years active: 28 Years
- Known for: famine relief work, educator
- Spouse: Minnie Crawford

Alfred George Jones (Chinese: 仲鈞安; pinyin: Zhòng Jūn'ān, 23 July 1846 - 17 July 1905) was an Irish baptist missionary to China. Jones had his own business in his native town of New Ross, Ireland, but left it in the hands of a manager in order to go on his mission to China. He attended Lancashire Independent College, a dissenting academy from 1874 to 1876 and arrived in Yantai, Shandong in 1876. In the following year, he went to Qingzhou to assist Timothy Richard by keeping the accounts for an ongoing relief effort for the victims of the Northern Chinese Famine of 1876–1879. He continued to reside in Qingzhou with the exception of the period from 1889 to 1896, during which he lived in Zouping. He died when a temple building on Taishan, Tai'an in which he was sleeping collapsed during a storm.
