= Alfred Jones (Northamptonshire cricketer) =

English cricketer

Personal information
- Full name: Alfred William Jones
- Born: 6 August 1900; Tewkesbury, Gloucestershire, England
- Died: 7 August 1986 (aged 86); Orton Longueville, Cambridgeshire, England
- Batting: Left-handed
- Bowling: Right-arm medium

Domestic team information
- Years: Team
- 1933: Northamptonshire

Career statistics
Competition	First-class
Matches	1
Runs scored	13
Batting average	6.50
100s/50s	–/–
Top score	12
Balls bowled	–
Wickets	–
Bowling average	–
5 wickets in innings	–
10 wickets in match	–
Best bowling	–
Catches/stumpings	–/–
- Source: Cricinfo, 15 November 2011

Alfred William Jones (6 August 1900 – 7 August 1986) was an English cricketer. Jones was a left-handed batsman who bowled right-arm medium pace. He was born at Tewkesbury, Gloucestershire.

Jones made a single first-class appearance for Northamptonshire against Sussex in the 1933 County Championship at the Town Ground, Peterborough. He scored a single run in Northamptonshire's first-innings, before being dismissed by Albert Wensley, while in their second-innings he was dismissed for 12 by James Langridge.

He died at Orton Longueville, Cambridgeshire the day after his 86th birthday on 7 August 1986.
