= Alan M. Jones =

American cell biologist (born 1957)

Alan M. Jones (born May 13, 1957) is an American cell biologist. He is Kenan Distinguished Professor of Biology at the University of North Carolina at Chapel Hill and has a joint appointment with the Department of Pharmacology in the UNC School of Medicine. He is a past President of the American Society of Plant Biologists (ASPB, 2013-2014). He is a Fellow of The American Association for the Advancement of Science, Fellow of American Society of Plant Biologists, and an Alexander von Humboldt Fellow.

== Education ==
Jones received his B.S summa cum laude in Botany from the University of Florida in 1978 and his PhD in Plant Biology from the University of Illinois at Urbana-Champaign in 1983. He was first under the mentorship of Larry N. Vanderhoef and finished his training with Tuan-hua David Ho. In the middle of his PhD program, Jones spent 2 years at the Friedrich Miescher Institute in Basal Switzerland under the mentorship of Fred Meins. His postdoctoral training was at the University of Wisconsin- Madison under the mentorship of Peter Quail. Jones joined the faculty at the University of North Carolina at Chapel Hill in 1986.

== Research ==
=== Phytochrome ===
During his postdoctoral training, Jones established that the plant photoreceptor, phytochrome A, is dimeric and he showed a minimal structural unit for photoperception. This worked continued into his early years at the University of North Carolina and directed subsequent structure analyses of phytochrome by other labs.

=== Plant Hormone Receptors ===
During the 1970s, in collaboration with the organic chemist Nelson Leonard, Jones invented a photoaffinity labeling technique to identify auxin receptors in plant extracts. He provided the first data proving that Auxin-binding Protein 1 (ABP1) binds auxin and, in collaboration with Michael Sussman, proved that this receptor is essential for normal auxin-mediated growth The later discovery was only the second report of a gene knockout mutant in the genetic model, Arabidopsis thaliana. Despite his proof that auxin binding to ABP1 is the rate-limiting step for auxin signal transduction, the classification of ABP1 as a hormone receptor remains controversial among plant cell biologists because the structure and properties of ABP1 do not fit any animal hormone receptor paradigm.

=== Programmed Cell Death ===
In the 1990s, Jones studied programmed cell death associated with plant cell differentiation. He elucidated the role of the vacuole in hydrolytic-based plant cell death.

=== G Protein-coupled Signaling ===
In 2000, Jones switched his research effort to the study of the heterotrimeric G protein signaling pathway in Arabidopsis. His rationalization was that Arabidopsis, having a simpler repertoire of G signaling elements than mouse and much easier to genetically engineer, would serve as a good multicellular model for G signaling research. Jones showed that G protein signaling in plants and many other taxa on the tree of life differed from the well-established animal paradigm.
