= Alan Jones (footballer, born 1944) =

Welsh footballer

Personal information
- Date of birth: 13 January 1944 (age 82)
- Place of birth: Caergwrle, Wales
- Position: Winger

Senior career*
Years	Team	Apps	(Gls)
- Johnstown
1964–1965	Wrexham	2	(0)
- Witton Albion
- * Club domestic league appearances and goals

Alan Jones (born 13 January 1944) is a Welsh former professional footballer who played as a winger. He played in the English football league for Wrexham. He also played for Johnstown and Witton Albion.
