= Qingzhou =

Qingzhou 青州市 Tsingchow
- County-level city
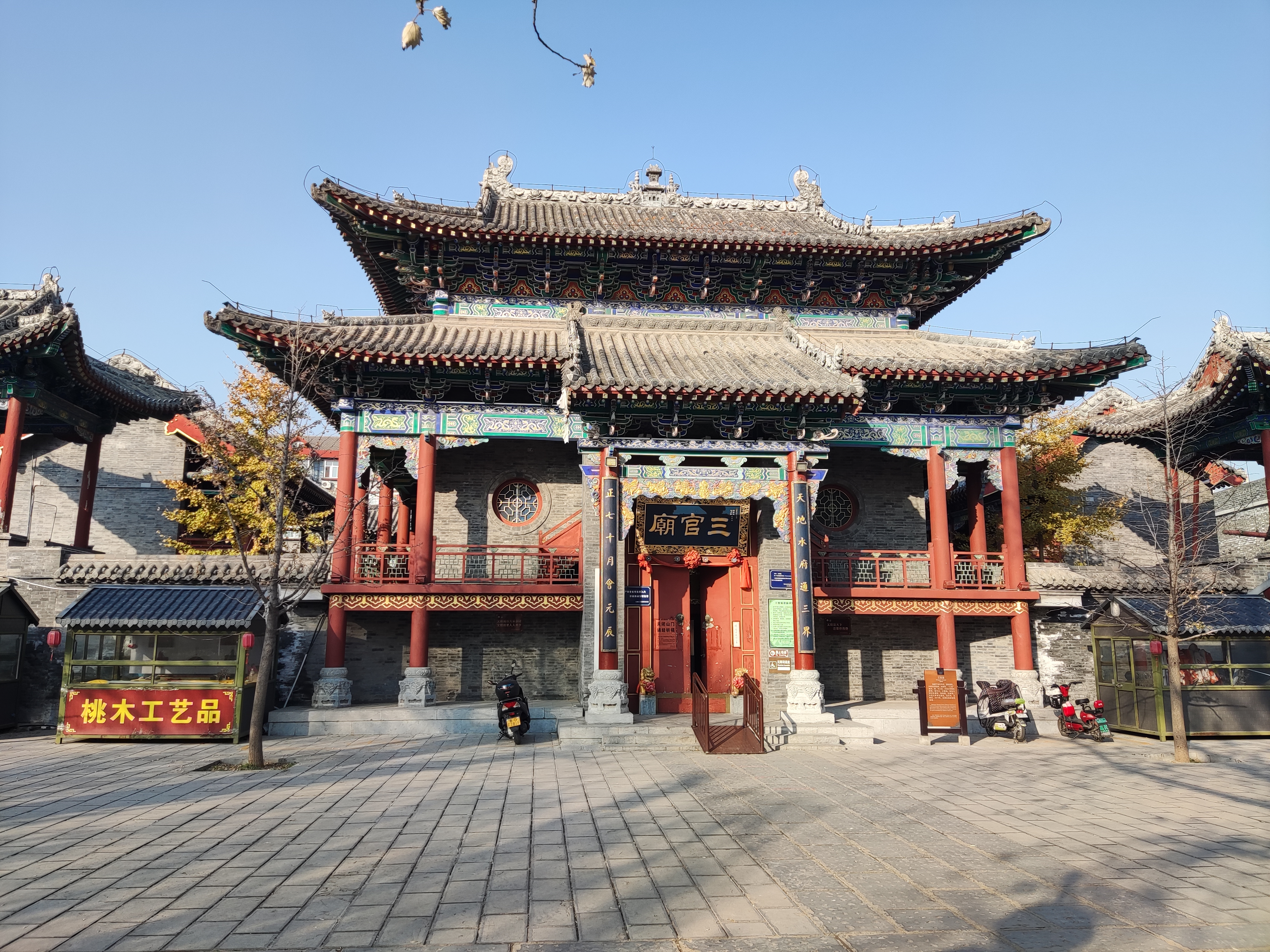
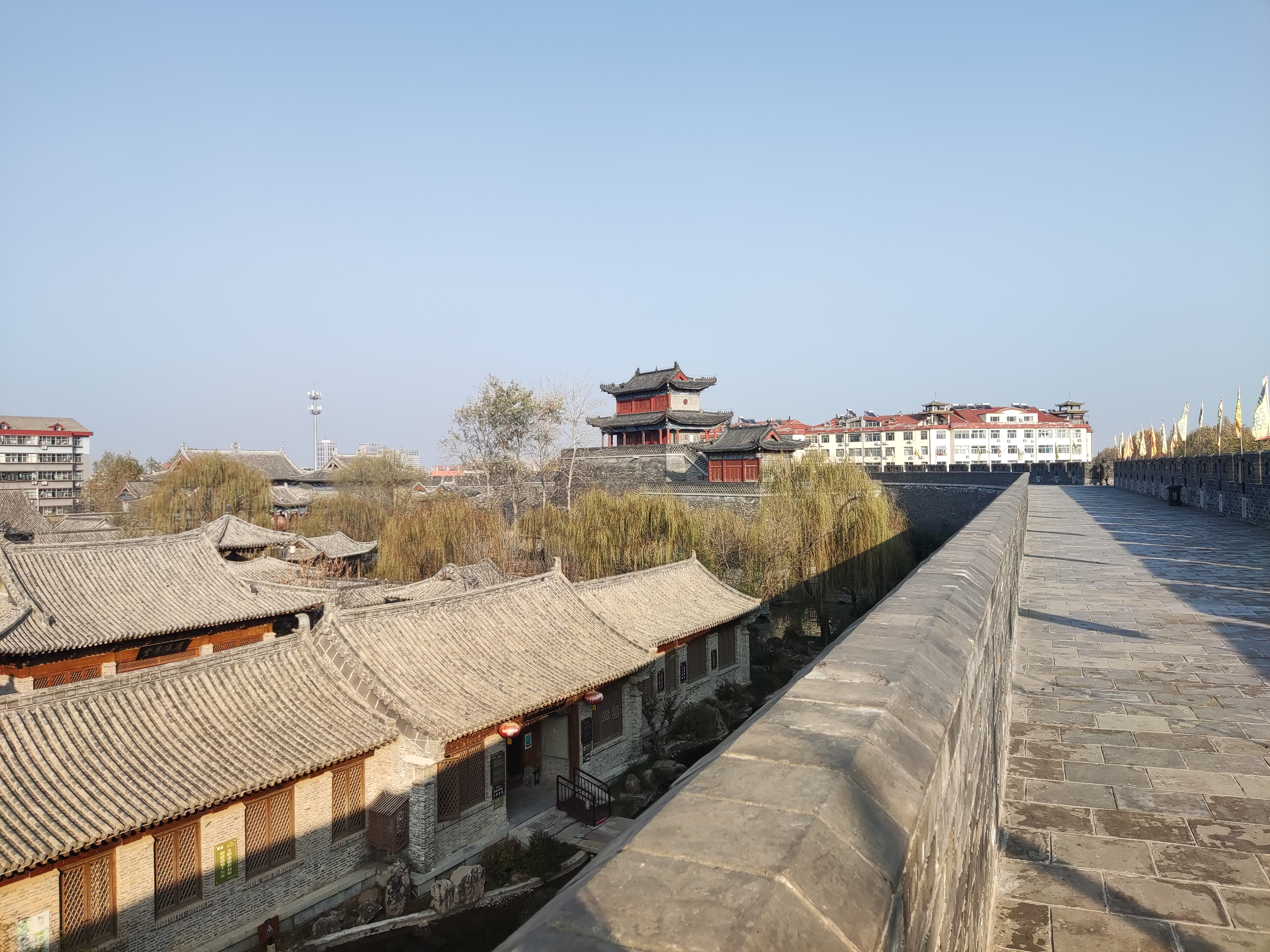
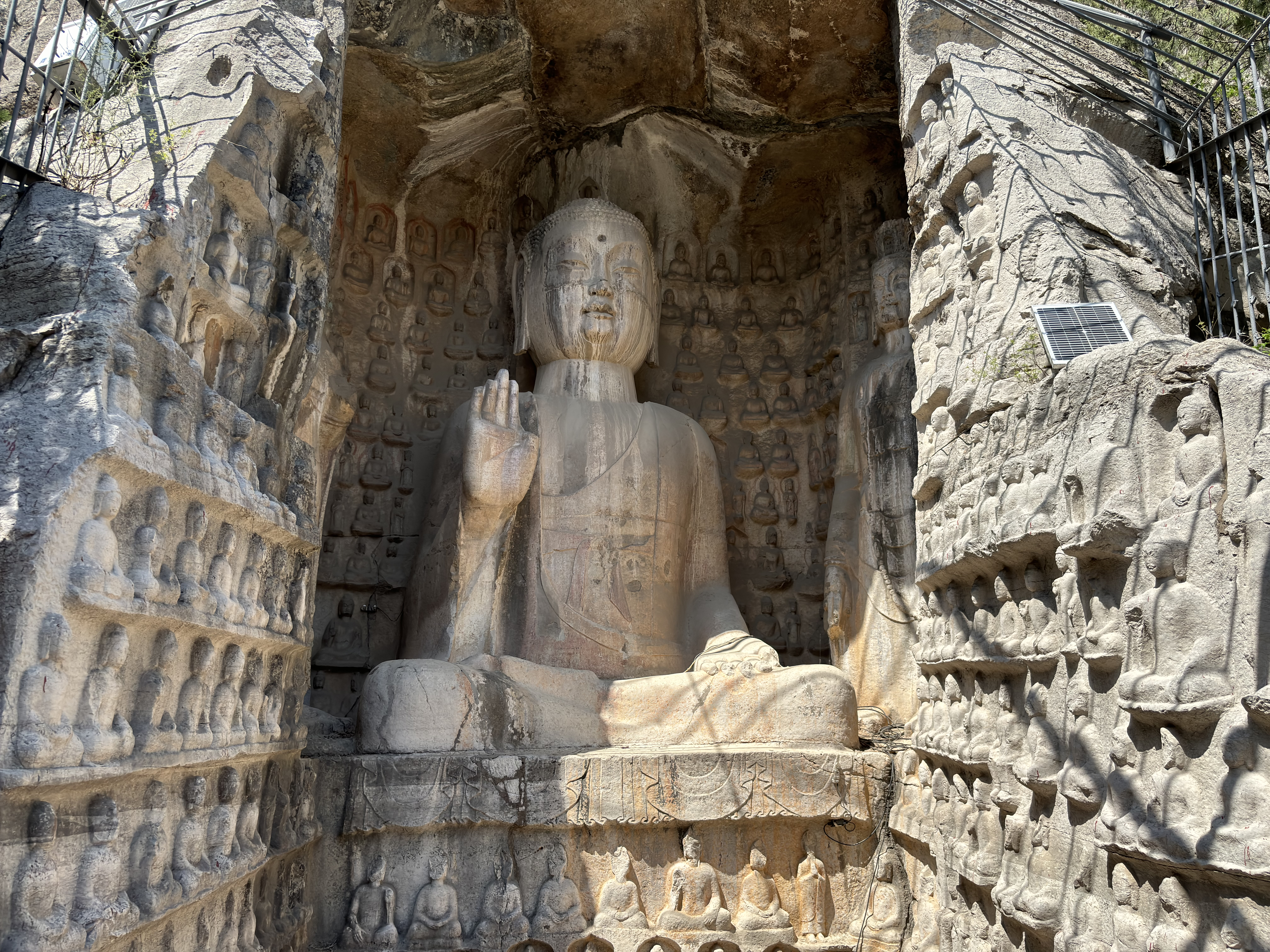
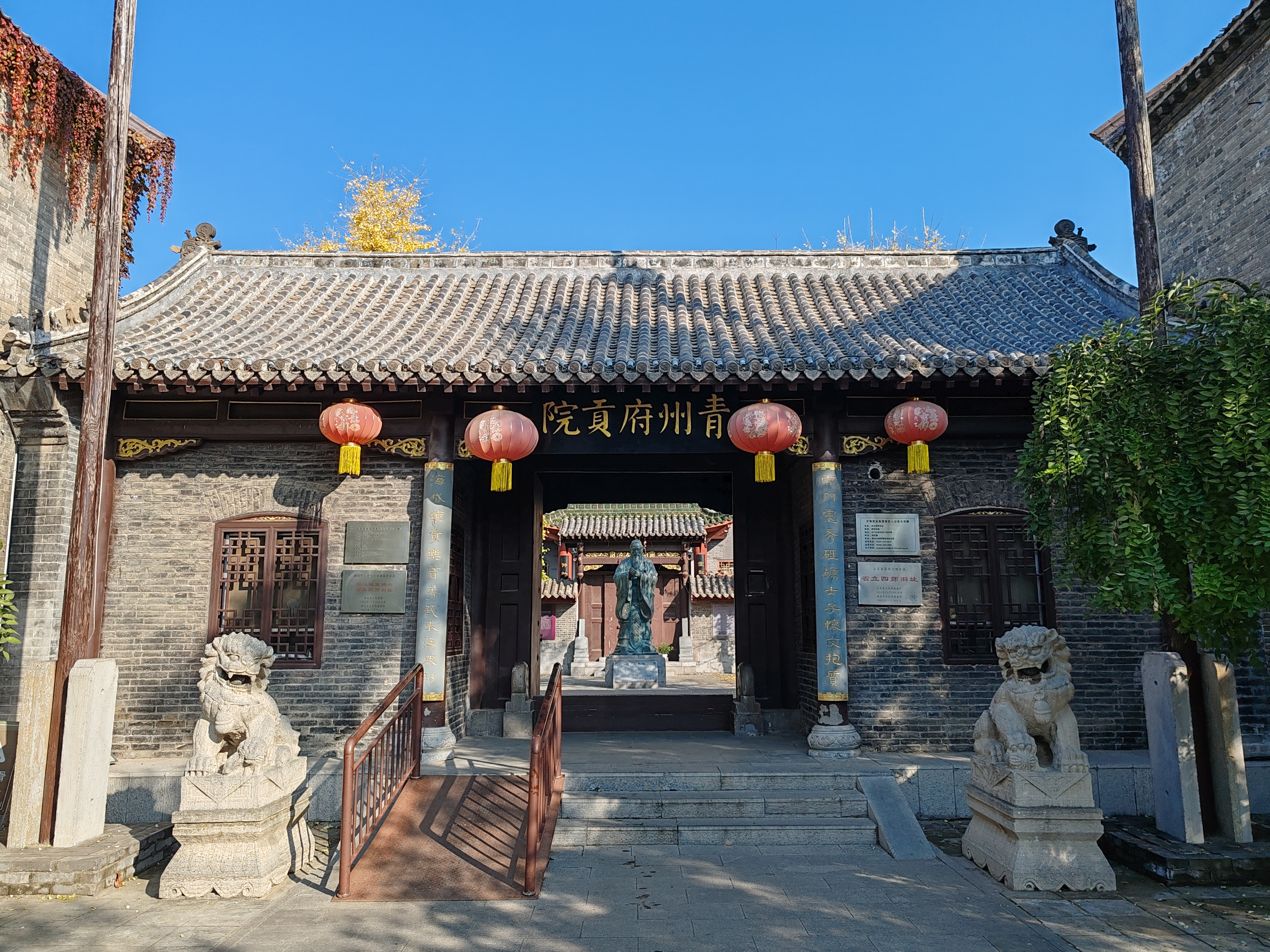
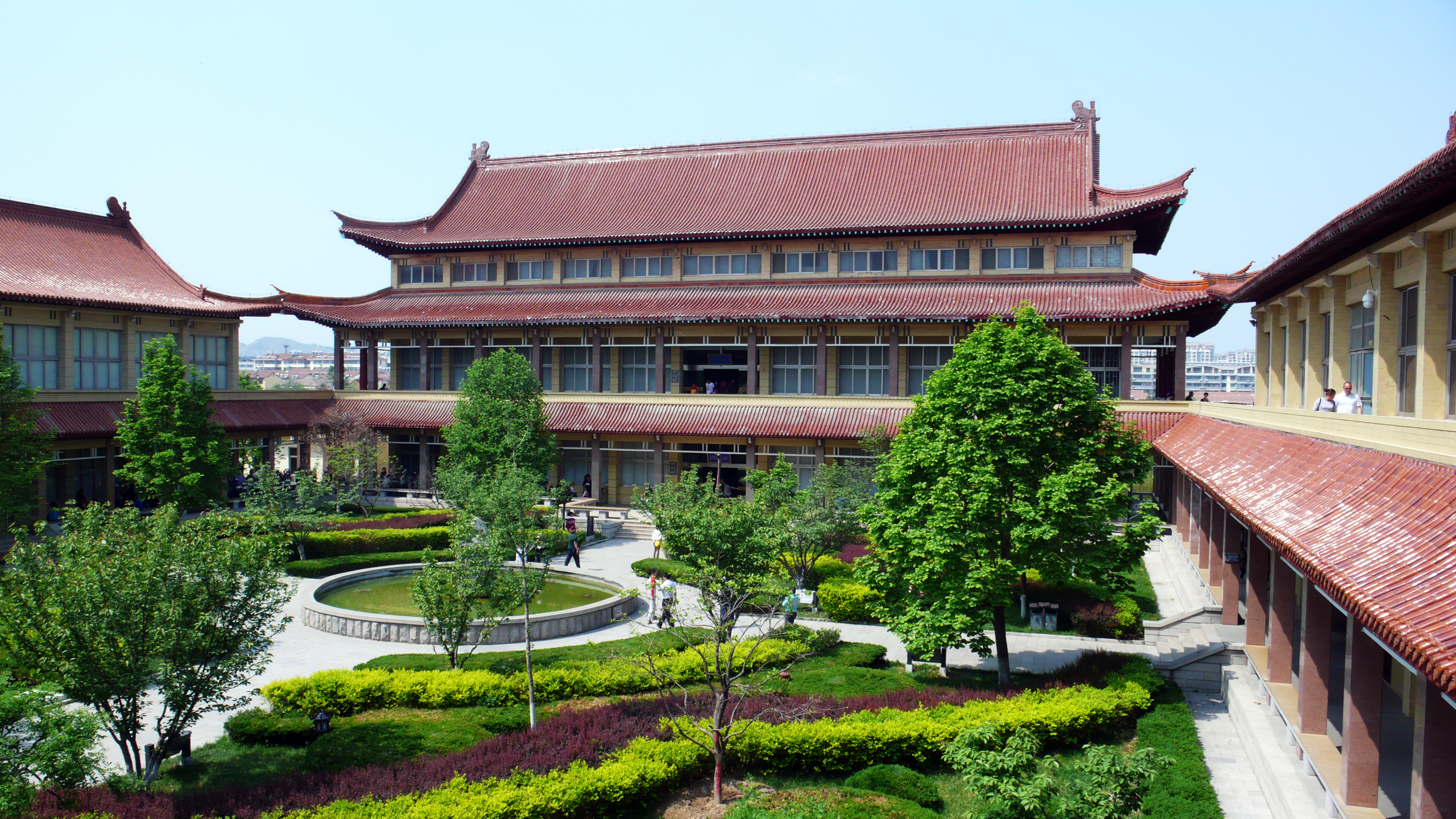
- Sanguan Temple Old City Wall Ou Garden Toushan Grottoes Old Qingzhou Confucius Temple Qingzhou Museum of Art

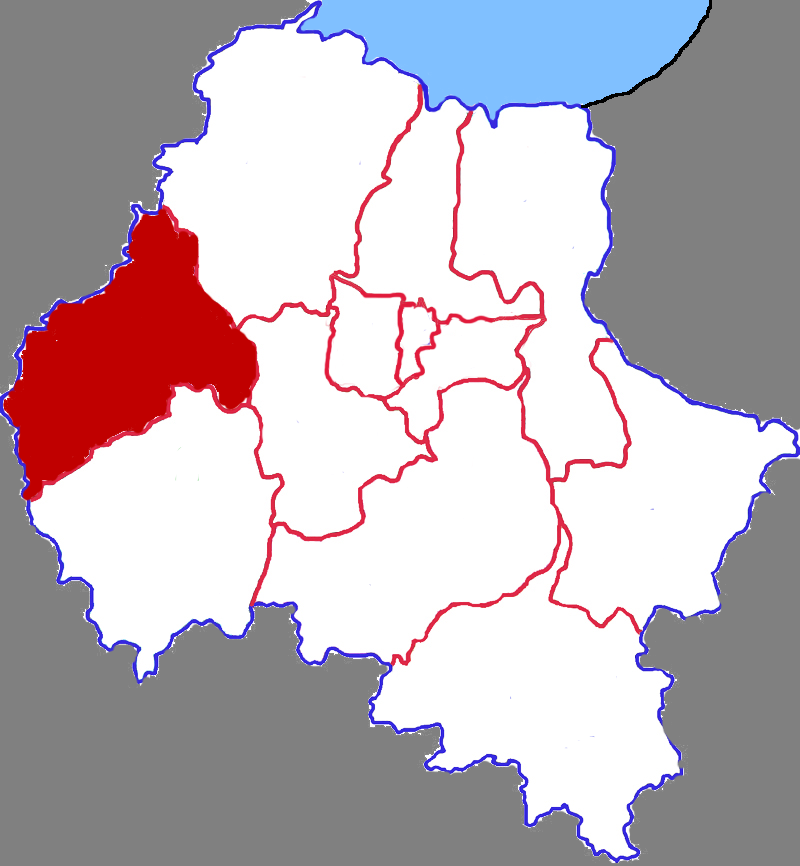
- Qingzhou in Weifang

- Location of the city center in Shandong
- Coordinates: 36°41′07″N 118°28′47″E
- Country: People's Republic of China
- Province: Shandong
- Prefecture-level city: Weifang

Area
  - Total: 1,569 km^{2} (606 sq mi)

Population (2024)
  - Total: 954,700

GDP (2024)
  - City: CN¥ 80.145 billion US$ 11.25 billion
  - Per capita: CN¥ 83,536; US$ 11,730
- Time zone: UTC+8 (China Standard)
- Postal code: 262500

Qingzhou (Chinese: 青州; pinyin: Qīngzhōu) Wade–Giles: Tsing-chou, sometimes written as Ching-chow-fu, formerly Yidu County (Yitu, 益都县), is a county-level city, which is located in the west of the prefecture-level city of Weifang, in the central part of Shandong Province, China. Qingzhou is a dynamic industry city, and also grows a great number of farm products. The local government holds an open policy of introduction of foreign capital, and has established strong business relationships with more than fifty countries and regions.

Qingzhou's historical heritages were highly praised and celebrated. In 2008, the Qingzhou Museum was recognized by the State Administration of Cultural Heritage as one of the first branch of national first-class museums, making it the only county-level city to possess such a museum. In 2009, Qingzhou’s Zhaode Ancient Street (昭德古街) was included in the first list of "China’s Historic and Cultural Streets". On November 18, 2013, the State Council officially designated Qingzhou as a National Famous Historical and Cultural City. In 2017, the Ancient City of Qingzhou was rated as a national 5A-level tourist attraction.

== Name ==
In Chinese mythology and ancestral worship traditions, Qingzhou corresponds to the East and Qingdi (lit. "Teal/Green Emperor").

The name "Qingzhou" (青州) first appears in the Shujing: Yu Gong, which states, "Between the Sea and the Mount there exists Qingzhou"; it was one of the ancient "Nine Provinces" (Jiuzhou). According to the Zhou Li, "The region due east is Qingzhou." Situated between the East China Sea and Mount Tai in the eastern part of China, and given that the East corresponds to the element of Wood, the color of which is Qing (青, teal), the area was named Qingzhou.

From 2nd century BC to 7th century, Qingzhou was a general term, describing a provincial level region which covers much of today's north Shandong, and since the 7th century, Qingzhou was the name of a prefecture situated in this region with administrative center in today's Qingzhou City.

In Western Jin and Southern Yan, today's Qingzhou City was called Guanggu (Chinese: 廣固; lit. 'vast and fortified'). After Emperor Wu of Song conquered Southern Yan, the Jin Army demolished Guanggu and rebuilt a city called Dongyang (Chinese: 東陽; lit. 'sun of the east'), and it was destroyed during the Jingkang incident.

The core region of today's Qingzhou City has constantly being called Yidu County (益都縣) since 127 BC, with county seat changed various times (e.g. Guanggu, Dongyang). Yidu County was abolished in 1986 in the waves of Reform of the administrative divisions of China, and replaced by a county-level Qingzhou City under the jurisdiction of Weifang Prefecture.

== History ==
=== Pre Qin era ===
海岱惟青州
Between the Sea and Mount Tai there exists Qingzhou

— Book of Documents, Yu Gong

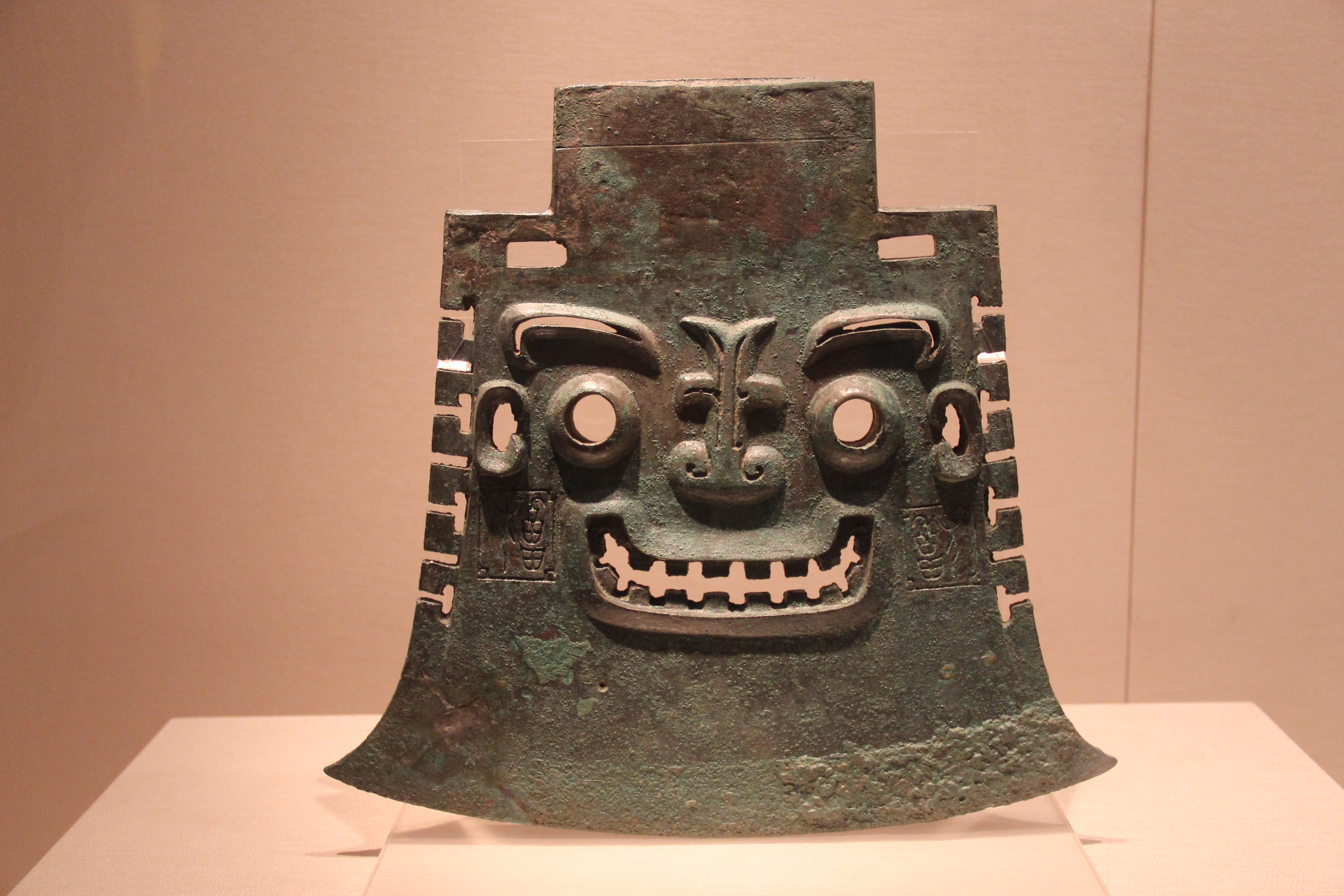
Yachou bronze axe, discovered in Qingzhou in 1965, was forged by a tribe of Dongyi people, its exquisite workmanship and valuable inscripts made it China's first-class national artifact and now preserved in China National Museum

In antiquity, the region of Qingzhou is said to have been occupied by the polities of the Shuangjiu clan (爽鸠), Jize clan (季則), Zhen’e clan (斟鄂), Zhenguan clan (斟灌), Pangbo clan (逄伯), Bogu clan (薄姑), and Ju (莒).

Qingzhou is named after one of the nine provinces that appear in the Yu Gong geography chapter of the classic Book of Documents composed during the Warring States period of Chinese history (403 BC-221 BC). The history of this centuries old city dates back to ancient times twenty two centuries ago when it was part of the Dongyi area.

During the Spring and Autumn and Warring States periods, Qingzhou belonged to the state of Qi. (According to "The Hereditary House of the Grand Duke of Qi" in Shiji, Qi’s domain extended east to the sea, west to the river, south to Muling and north to Wudi. The Qi capital was first at Yingqiu and later moved to Linzi, which was close to Qingzhou.

=== Imperial era ===
In 204 BCE during the Western Han Dynasty, the county seat of Guang County was established in what is now the southwest of urban Qingzhou. In 106 BCE, the Qingzhou Inspectorate (青州刺史部) was set up, headquartered at Linzi.

In 311 during the Western Jin, Cao Yi abandoned Guang County and built Guanggu, which then served as the seat of the Qingzhou Inspector. In 399, Murong De captured Guanggu and made it the capital of the state of Southern Yan—the only location in Shandong to have served as a dynastic capital. Later Liu Yu destroyed Southern Yan, razed Guanggu, constructed Dongyang City, and established the office of the Inspector of Northern Qingzhou there.

In 412, the Chinese Buddhist pilgrim Faxian landed on the south of Shandong peninsula at Laoshan, and proceeded to Qingzhou to translate and edit the scriptures he had collected in India.

In 517, the southern outer wall of Dongyang City was expanded, forming Nanyang City. In 557, during the Northern Qi era, the seat of Yidu County was moved to Dongyang City, and the Qingzhou prefectural seat was relocated to Nanyang City.

Under the Sui dynasty, it served as the headquarters of the Qingzhou General Governor’s Office, later changed to the seat of Beihai Commandery. In the early Tang it again served as the Qingzhou General Governor’s Office, and was later changed back to the seat of Beihai Commandery.

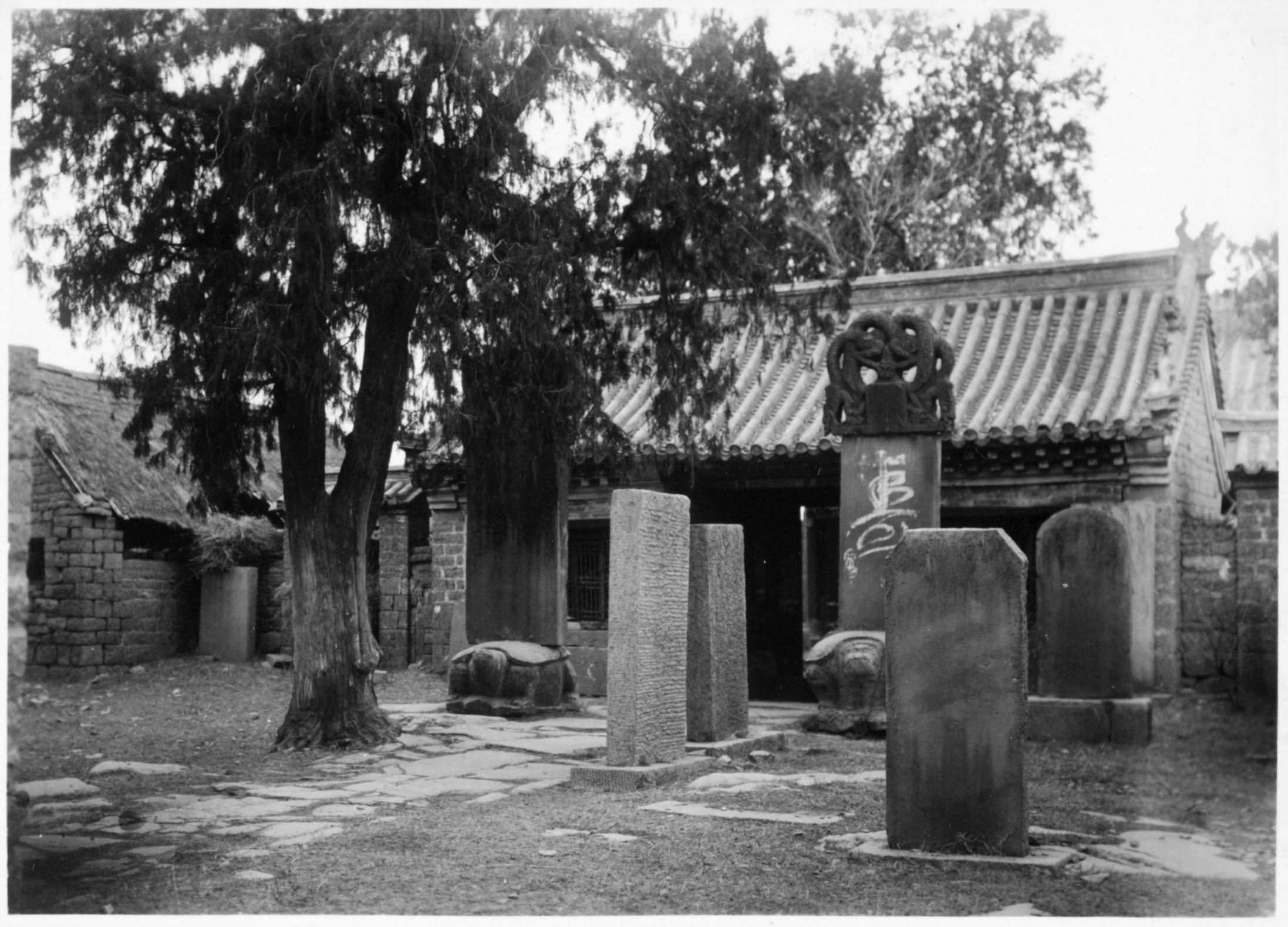
Mt. Tuo in the 1920s

Under the Song dynasty it was the administrative seat of the Jingdong Eastern Circuit; under the Jin it was the Yidu General Administration Office of the Shandong Eastern Circuit; under the Yuan it was the seat of the Pacification Commission for the Eastern and Western Routes of Shandong.

During the Ming and Qing periods, it was the seat of Qingzhou Prefecture. From 1368 to 1377, it served as the capital of Shandong Province, before it was moved to Jinan.

=== Modern era ===
In the Republic of China era it belonged to Yidu County. After the founding of the People's Republic of China, it came under Changwei District (today’s Weifang).

In 1986, the County was abolished, replaced with the Qingzhou City. In the same year the discovery of over 200 buried Buddhist statues at Qingzhou was hailed as a major archaeological was found. The statues included early examples of painted figures, and are thought to have been buried due to Emperor Huizong's Song Dynasty repression of Buddhism who favoured Taoism.

== Administrative divisions ==
As of 2012, this city is divided to 3 subdistricts and 9 towns.

Subdistricts

- Wangfu Subdistrict (王府街道)
- Yidu Subdistrict (益都街道)
- Yunmenshan Subdistrict (云门山街道)

Towns

- Mihe (弥河镇)
- Wangfen (王坟镇)
- Miaozi (庙子镇)
- Shaozhuang (邵庄镇)
- Gaoliu (高柳镇)
- Heguan (何官镇)
- Dongxia (东夏镇)
- Tanfang (谭坊镇)
- Huanglou (黄楼镇)

== Demographics ==
=== Total number ===
According to the seventh national census, the resident population of Qingzhou City was 960,882. Of this total, the male population was 484,786 (50.45%) and the female population was 476,096 (49.55%). The overall sex ratio (males per 100 females) was 101.83. Regarding the age structure, the population aged 0–14 was 158,461 (16.49%); the population aged 15–59 was 582,876 (60.66%); and the population aged 60 and above was 219,545 (22.85%), with those aged 65 and above numbering 159,530 (16.60%).

By the end of 2023, the resident population of Qingzhou City stood at 964,000. There were 5,211 births during the year, resulting in a birth rate of 5.41‰. By the end of 2024, the resident population of Qingzhou City stood at 954,700. There were 5,484 births during the year, and the sex ratio at birth was 108.8.

=== Races ===
Qingzhou used to be one of the eleven Manchu garrisons in China during the Qing dynasty, with a notable number of soldiers died in the Battle of Zhenjiang during the First Opium War. However, after the dissolution of Qing dynasty, those descendants of Manchus fled to other industrialized region such as Qingdao, Jinan and Beijing to seek their livelihood. Thus there are very few Manchus in Qingzhou today.

Qingzhou is now one of several concentration of Hui People in Shandong Province, with twenty thousand Hui residents living around the downtown area. There are 25 Hui neighborhoods in Qingzhou, where many old Mosques can be found.

=== Dialect ===
The local dialect of Qingzhou is Jiaoliao Mandarin.

== Climate ==
Climate data for Qingzhou, elevation 103 m (338 ft), (1991–2020 normals, extremes 1981–2010)
Month	Jan	Feb	Mar	Apr	May	Jun	Jul	Aug	Sep	Oct	Nov	Dec	Year
Record high °C (°F)	20.0 (68.0)	26.1 (79.0)	32.4 (90.3)	35.9 (96.6)	38.4 (101.1)	41.9 (107.4)	39.6 (103.3)	37.9 (100.2)	39.0 (102.2)	35.4 (95.7)	27.4 (81.3)	23.1 (73.6)	41.9 (107.4)
Mean daily maximum °C (°F)	3.8 (38.8)	7.2 (45.0)	15.0 (59.0)	21.3 (70.3)	27.6 (81.7)	30.8 (87.4)	32.2 (90.0)	30.7 (87.3)	27.0 (80.6)	20.9 (69.6)	13.1 (55.6)	5.7 (42.3)	19.6 (67.3)
Daily mean °C (°F)	−1.9 (28.6)	1.2 (34.2)	8.3 (46.9)	14.8 (58.6)	21.3 (70.3)	25.0 (77.0)	27.0 (80.6)	25.7 (78.3)	21.1 (70.0)	14.2 (57.6)	7.1 (44.8)	0.0 (32.0)	13.7 (56.6)
Mean daily minimum °C (°F)	−6.1 (21.0)	−3.5 (25.7)	2.3 (36.1)	8.4 (47.1)	14.8 (58.6)	19.4 (66.9)	22.6 (72.7)	21.8 (71.2)	16.3 (61.3)	8.9 (48.0)	2.3 (36.1)	−4.2 (24.4)	8.6 (47.4)
Record low °C (°F)	−15.3 (4.5)	−13.2 (8.2)	−7.6 (18.3)	−2.3 (27.9)	3.0 (37.4)	9.5 (49.1)	13.8 (56.8)	14.0 (57.2)	6.5 (43.7)	−1.1 (30.0)	−11.7 (10.9)	−17.3 (0.9)	−17.3 (0.9)
Average precipitation mm (inches)	8.8 (0.35)	15.0 (0.59)	14.4 (0.57)	31.2 (1.23)	55.9 (2.20)	76.2 (3.00)	137.6 (5.42)	198.2 (7.80)	57.8 (2.28)	32.3 (1.27)	32.6 (1.28)	12.0 (0.47)	672 (26.46)
Average precipitation days (≥ 0.1 mm)	3.0	3.5	4.0	5.6	7.0	8.3	12.1	11.7	6.9	5.6	4.9	4.1	76.7
Average snowy days	4.6	3.8	1.7	0.2	0	0	0	0	0	0	1.1	2.9	14.3
Average relative humidity (%)	57	54	48	49	55	60	74	78	71	65	63	58	61
Mean monthly sunshine hours	170.2	171.6	220.0	240.2	266.6	240.0	208.5	199.8	203.5	200.6	171.1	170.6	2,462.7
Percentage possible sunshine	55	56	59	61	61	55	47	48	55	58	56	57	56
Source: China Meteorological Administration

== Tourism ==
Attractions

Qingzhou Museum

- Fan Gongting an ancient pavilion built in Song Dynasty. It was a private garden of Fan Zhongyan who was the most notable poet and prosaist in an age of lively literature prosperous.
- A Muslim district, including at least two large and historic mosques. The oldest one is the Zhenjiao Mosque (Chinese: 真教寺; pinyin: Zhēnjiào Sì). It dates back to 1302 and is one of the three most well-known mosques of the Yuan dynasty.
- Ou Yuan, a Ming Dynasty garden. It turned to be a combination of park and zoo, and is used as a performance area for citizens in the dawn and nightfall.
- Qingzhou Museum, featuring some of the Buddhist statues unearthed in 1996–7
- Tuoshan ("Camel Mountain") and Yunmenshan ("Cloud Gate Mountain") a pair of mountains which include an ancient collection of Buddhist grottoes under national protection. The mountains are located approximately 4 kilometres (2.5 mi) southwest of the city center, with a single gondola servicing both. (the coordinates of the peak are 36°38′54.9″N 118°27′27.5″E).
- Yang Tian, a natural park with marvelous surface features. It is covered by virgin forest, through which crystal rivers are flowing, and dotted with quantities of natural rock cavities. What makes this park more amazing is the so-called thousand Buddha's cave, which is considered as the first cave for the Buddhas. This is because of the huge volume of the cavern and the 1048 Buddhas in it that are in different postures and look extraordinarily vivid.
