= Kentucky in the War of 1812 =

During the War of 1812, Kentucky supplied numerous troops and supplies to the war effort. Because Kentucky did not have to commit manpower to defending fortifications, most Kentucky troops campaigned actively against the enemy. This led to Kentucky seeing more battle casualties than all other states combined.

== War of 1812 ==
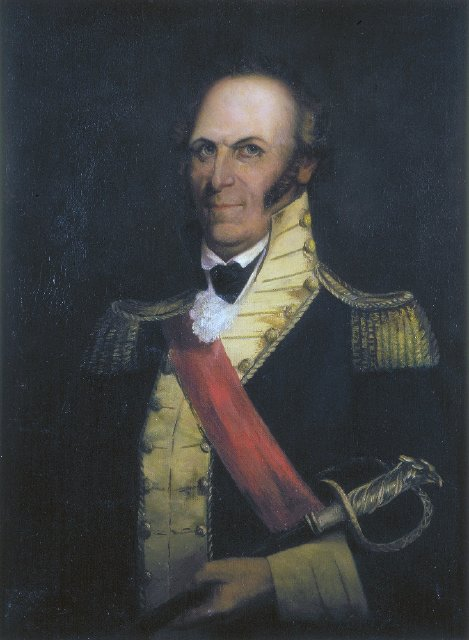
Kentucky governor Charles Scott

With the impending onset of hostilities, the governor of the Indiana Territory, future United States President William Henry Harrison sought military assistance from neighboring Kentucky. After being appointed brigadier general of the Kentucky militia on August 22, Harrison went to attain the force in order to defend the Indiana territorial government at Vincennes, Indiana. Harrison had resigned his military commission in December 1811, but with the help of Kentucky governor Charles Scott, he was able to recruit Kentucky citizens to help defend Indiana; citizens in Ohio and Indiana had heard of the lack of camp provisions and chose not to be burdened by such hardships. As a result, most of Kentucky's militia during the war fought in what was the old Northwest Territory.

== Militia ==
Some 25,010 Kentuckians served in war, which was about five out of every six men then of military age. Fighting against both the British and their Native Americans allies, Kentucky sent a total of 36 regiments, four battalions, and twelve independent companies to the field, an almost unbelievable accomplishment considering the state's small population at the time.

Counties named for fallen River Raisin officers
Allen County	John Allen
Ballard County	Bland Ballard
Edmonson County	John Edmonson
Graves County	Benjamin Franklin Graves
Hart County	Nathaniel G. S. Hart
Hickman County	Paschal Hickman
McCracken County	Phil McCracken
Meade County	James Meade
Simpson County	John Simpson

John Allen, a former gubernatorial candidate and Kentucky state legislator, on June 5, 1812, was made colonel of the 1st Kentucky Rifle Regiment, first militia troops raised by the state for the war. Allen was killed while rallying his men at the Battle of the River Raisin in Michigan. He was buried in Frankfort Cemetery, and Kentucky, Indiana, and Ohio would all name counties in his honor. Eight other Kentucky officers died in either the battle or the massacre that followed it, and had counties named for them. The River Raisin casualties included about 400 Kentuckians killed in the fighting, plus eighty wounded prisoners who were tomahawked by the Indians as soon as the British departed. The murder of the prisoners led to the Kentuckian's rallying cry for the rest of the war - Remember the River Raisin!

Many Kentuckians also took part in Andrew Jackson's defeat of a British force at the Battle of New Orleans, which took place (unknown to the participants) after the peace treaty had already been signed.

== Kentucky militia service in U.S. Army campaigns ==
- Indiana
- Illinois
- Ohio
- Michigan
- Ontario, Canada
- Louisiana

Isaac Shelby, Kentucky's 1st and 5th Governor and Revolutionary War hero, helped lead the Kentucky militia in the War of 1812 in the recapture of Fort Detroit from the British when he was in his 60s, leading to its renaming as Fort Shelby. Shelby also joined General Harrison in pursuing the retreating British troops led by Major-General Henry Procter and the Indian leader Tecumseh into Canada, defeating them and killing Tecumseh at the Battle of the Thames.

Almost all the American soldiers at the Battle of Wild Cat Creek, fought in northern Indiana, were residents of the Hopkinsville, Kentucky area in southwestern Kentucky.

== Homefront ==
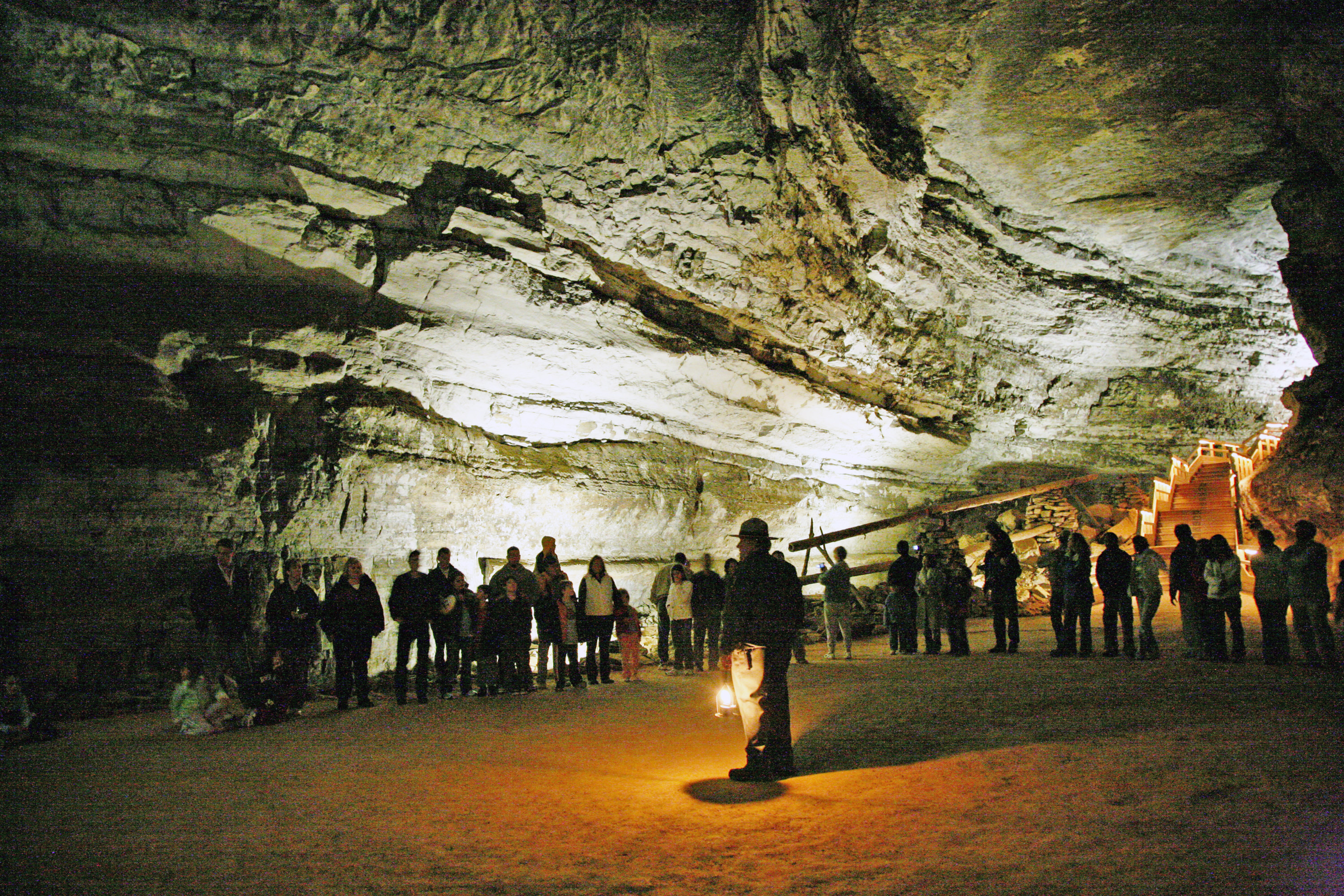
Mammoth Cave

Kentucky helped supply the war. A major supply depot for the war was at Newport, Kentucky. Dubbed Newport Barracks, the staging area would later serve as a supply depot for conflicts with Mexico later in the century. Saltpeter was heavily mined in Carter County and at the Great Saltpeter Cave in Rockcastle County. But the most notable mining was at Mammoth Cave, whose saltpeter, considered exceptional quality, was numbered at 570,000 pounds produced during the war.

The war also affected the state's economy. Due to the inability to trade with Britain during the war, "rudimentary manufacturing" was spurred during the timeframe. To help pay for the war, a distilled spirits excise tax was levied during the war, and would not end until 1817. The next such tax would not be levied until the Civil War in 1862.

== Future governors ==
The War of 1812 had a lasting effect on Kentucky. One consequence was that the Shawnee never again challenged white control of the state. Also, a number of Kentucky's future leaders served in the war. Counting Isaac Shelby's second term, which began just after the outbreak of hostilities, six consecutive governors of Kentucky were veterans of the war. Later governors Charles A. Wickliffe and John J. Crittenden also served as aides-de-camp in the war. Twenty-two of Kentucky's one hundred twenty counties are named for participants in the War of 1812, including nine that were named after soldiers killed at the Battle of River Raisin.

== Sources ==
- Kleber, John E., ed. (1992). The Kentucky Encyclopedia. University Press of Kentucky. ISBN 0-8131-1772-0.
- Mahon, John K. (1991). The War of 1812. Da Capo Press. ISBN 0-306-80429-8.
