= Tamworth =

Tamworth may refer to:

== Places ==
=== England ===
- Tamworth, Staffordshire, West Midlands
- Tamworth (constituency), to the UK Parliament

=== Australia ===
- Tamworth, New South Wales
  - Tamworth Airport
- Tamworth Regional Council, a local government area
- Electoral district of Tamworth, to the New South Wales Legislative Assembly

=== Elsewhere ===
- Tamworth, Virginia, United States
- Tamworth, New Hampshire, United States
- Tamworth, Ontario, Canada

== Other uses ==
- Tamworth pig, a British pig breed
- Tamworth F.C., an English association football club
- John Tamworth (died 1569), English courtier

== See also ==
- Tamworth Two, a pair of escaped pigs
- Tamworth Manifesto, an 1834 Conservative Party manifesto
- Tanworth-in-Arden, Warwickshire, England
