= Charles Scott (Kentucky politician) =

Governor of Kentucky from 1808 to 1812

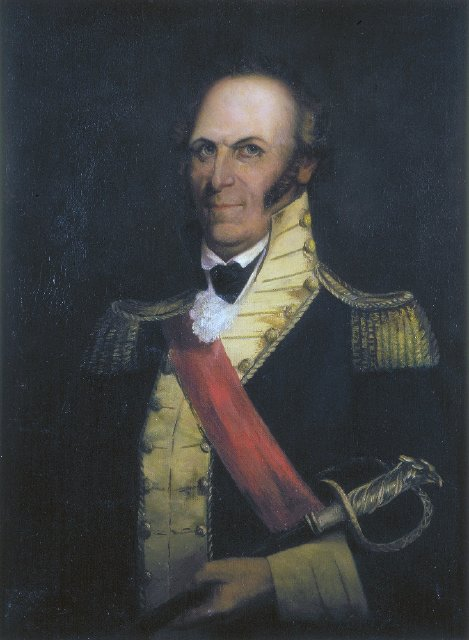
- 1907 portrait

4th Governor of Kentucky
- In office September 1, 1808 – August 24, 1812
- Lieutenant: Gabriel Slaughter
- Preceded by: Christopher Greenup
- Succeeded by: Isaac Shelby

Personal details
- Born: April 1739 Goochland County, Virginia
- Died: October 22, 1813 (aged 74) Clark County, Kentucky, U.S.
- Resting place: Frankfort Cemetery
- Party: Democratic-Republican
- Spouses: Frances Sweeney (m. 1762–1804); Judith Cary (Bell) Gist (m. 1807–1813)
- Relations: Father-in-law of George M. Bibb; Step-father-in-law of Jesse Bledsoe, Nathaniel G. S. Hart, Francis Preston Blair
- Occupation: Military officer; politician

Military service
- Allegiance: Virginia; United Colonies; United States
- Branch/service: Virginia Provincial Forces; Virginia Militia; Continental Army; Kentucky Militia
- Years of service: 1755–c. 1761; 1775–1783; 1790–1794
- Rank: Major general
- Unit: Virginia Regiment; 2nd Virginia Regiment
- Commands: 5th Virginia Regiment; 4th Virginia Brigade; 2nd Division, Kentucky militia
- Battles/wars: French and Indian War; Forbes Expedition; Anglo-Cherokee War; American Revolutionary War; Battle of Great Bridge; Battle of Trenton; Battle of the Assunpink Creek; Battle of Drake's Farm; Battle of Quibbletown; Battle of Brandywine; Battle of Germantown; Battle of Monmouth; Siege of Charleston (POW); Northwest Indian War; Blackberry Campaign; Battle of Fallen Timbers

Major General Charles Scott (April 1739 – October 22, 1813) was an American military officer and politician who served as the governor of Kentucky from 1808 to 1812. Orphaned in his teens, Scott enlisted in the Virginia Regiment in 1755 and served in the French and Indian War, rising through the ranks to become a captain. After the war, he married and settled down to life as a farmer, but returned to active military service in 1775 as the Revolutionary War neared. In 1776, Scott was made the 5th Virginia Regiment's colonel, serving under George Washington in the Philadelphia campaign. Furloughed in 1779, Scott soon returned to active service and went to South Carolina to assist General Benjamin Lincoln. He arrived in Charleston just as British forces had begun besieging it. Captured when the city fell, Scott was exchanged in 1782, completing several recruiting assignments before the war's end in 1783.

Scott visited the western frontier in 1785 and resettled near present-day Versailles, Kentucky in 1787. He raised a volunteer company in 1790 and joined Josiah Harmar for an expedition against the Northwestern Confederacy. Following the expedition's failure, Scott was ordered to conduct a series of raids against the confederacy in preparation for a main campaign by Arthur St. Clair, which also defeated. Shortly after the separation of Kentucky from Virginia in 1792, the Kentucky General Assembly commissioned Scott as a major general and gave him command of the Kentucky militia's 2nd Division. Scott's division fought with Legion of the United States for the rest of the Northwest Indian War, including their decisive victory at the Battle of Fallen Timbers.

Having previously served in the Virginia House of Delegates and as a presidential elector, Scott ran for governor 1808, winning over John Allen and Green Clay. An injury suffered early on in his term confined Scott to crutches and left him reliant on his step-son-in-law Jesse Bledsoe, whom he appointed Secretary of State. Although he frequently clashed with the state legislature over domestic matters, Scott's primary concern were the increasing Anglo-American tensions in the run-up to the War of 1812. Following the end of his tenure as governor in 1812, Scott returned to his estate, where his health declined rapidly before Scott died in 1813. Scottsville, Kentucky along with Scott County, Kentucky and Scott County, Indiana are named in his honor.

== Early life and family ==
Charles Scott was born in 1739, probably in April, in then vast Goochland County, Virginia, which later became Cumberland County in 1748, and some of which in 1775 became Powhatan County. His father, Samuel Scott, was a farmer and member of the Virginia House of Burgesses. His mother, whose name is not known, died most likely around 1745. Scott had an older brother, John, and three younger siblings, Edward, Joseph, and Martha. He received only a basic education from his parents and in the rural Virginia schools near his home.

Shortly after his father died in 1755, Scott was apprenticed to a carpenter. In late July 1755, a local court was preparing to place him with a guardian, but in October, before the court acted, Scott enlisted in the Virginia Regiment. He was assigned to David Bell's company. During the early part of the French and Indian War, he won praise from his superiors as a frontier scout and woodsman. Most of his fellow soldiers were undisciplined and poorly trained, allowing Scott to stand out and quickly rise to the rank of corporal. By June 1756, he had been promoted to sergeant.

Many biographies state that Scott served under George Washington in the Braddock Expedition, a failed attempt to capture Fort Duquesne from the French. This, however, is unlikely. There is no record of his claiming participation and his enlistment in the Virginia Regiment occurred after the expedition ended. For most of 1756 and the early part of 1757, he divided his time between Fort Cumberland and Fort Washington, conducting scouting and escort missions. In April 1757, Bell was relieved of his command as part of a general downsizing of Washington's regiment, and Scott was assigned to Captain Robert McKenzie at Fort Pearsall. In August and September, Washington sent Scott and a small scouting party on two reconnaissance missions to Fort Duquesne in preparation for an assault on that fort, but the party learned little on either mission. In November, Scott was part of the Forbes Expedition that captured the fort. He spent the latter part of the year at Fort Loudoun, where Washington promoted him to ensign.

Scott spent most of 1759 conducting escort missions and constructing roads and forts. During this time, the colonelcy of the Virginia Regiment had passed from George Washington to William Byrd III. In July 1760, Scott was appointed as the captain of the regiment's fifth company and joined under Byrd in an expedition against the Cherokee in 1760. Scott's exact role in the campaign is not known. The expedition was a success, and Virginia Governor Francis Fauquier ordered the Virginia Regiment disbanded in February 1762; Scott had left the regiment at some unknown date prior to that.

Sometime prior to 1762, Scott's older brother, John, died, leaving Scott to inherit his father's land near the James River and Muddy Creek. Having been discharged from his unit, he had settled on his inherited farm by late 1761. On February 25, 1762, he married Frances Sweeney from Cumberland County, Virginia. Using the forced labor of approximately 10 slaves he owned, Scott oversaw the production of tobacco and flour on his farm. In July 1766, he was named one of two captains in the local militia unit. Over the next several years, Scott and his wife had four boys and four or five girls.

== Revolutionary War ==
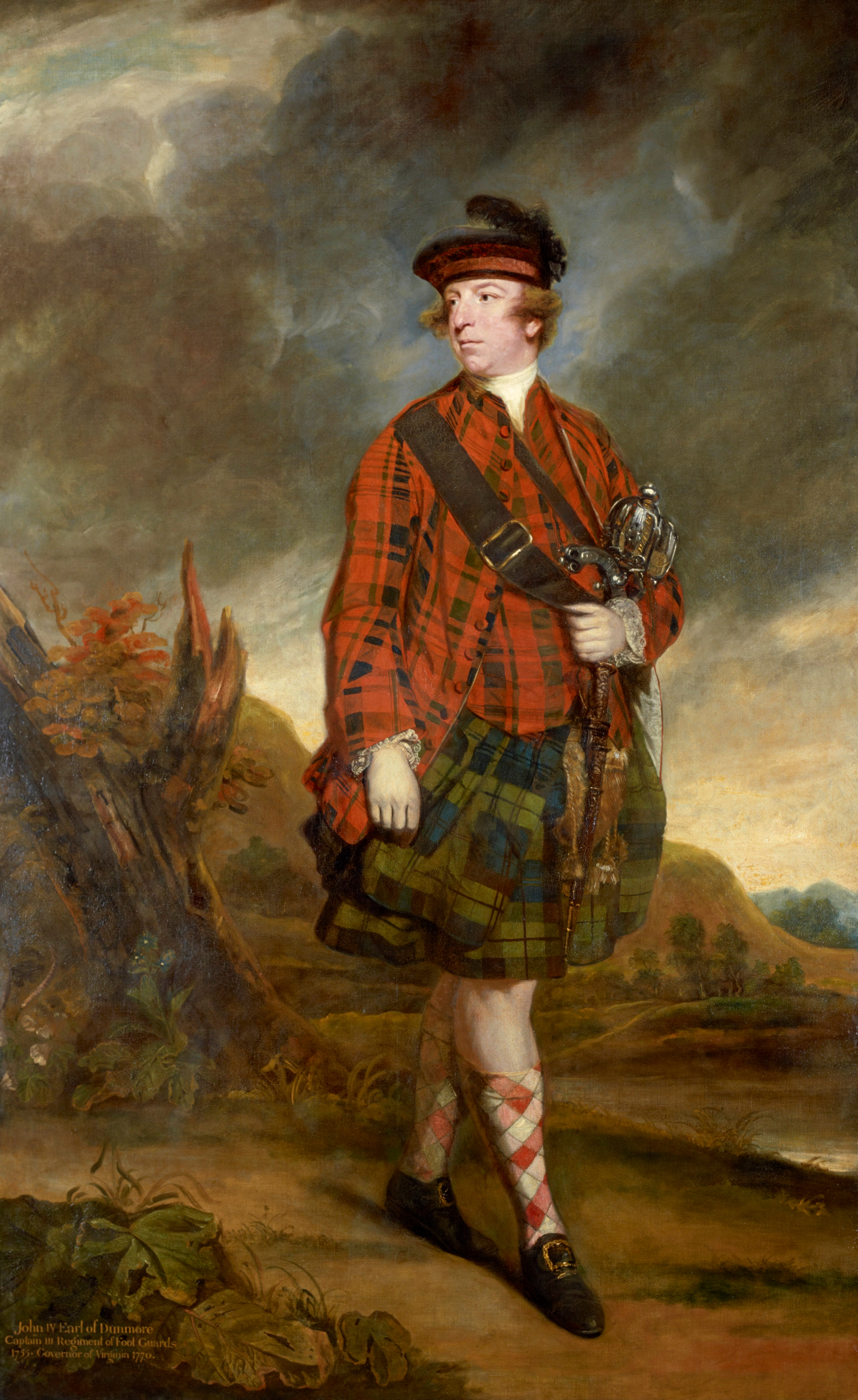
Lord Dunmore; Scott's men helped drive him from Virginia

As the American Revolutionary War neared in 1775, Scott raised a company of volunteers in Cumberland County. It was the first company formed south of the James River to participate in the war. The company stood ready to aid Patrick Henry in an anticipated clash with Lord Dunmore at Williamsburg, Virginia, in May 1775, but Dunmore abandoned the city in June, and they joined units from the surrounding counties in Williamsburg later that month. In July, the Virginia Convention created two regiments of Virginia troops, one under Patrick Henry and the other under William Woodford. As those leaders departed for Williamsburg, the Conventions acknowledged Scott as temporary commander-in-chief of the volunteers already assembled there. On August 17, 1775, he was elected lieutenant colonel of Woodford's regiment, the 2nd Virginia. His younger brother, Joseph, served as a lieutenant in the regiment. In December, Woodford dispatched Scott and 150 men to Great Bridge, Virginia, to defend a crossing point on the Elizabeth River. Days later, this force played a significant role in the December 9, 1775, Battle of Great Bridge by repulsing a British force under Captain Charles Fordyce on the crossing; Fordyce and many of his soldiers were killed in action. Following the battle, American forces were able to occupy the city of Norfolk, Virginia, and Lord Dunmore eventually departed from Virginia.

On February 13, 1776, the 2nd Virginia became a part of the Continental Army; Scott retained his rank of lieutenant colonel during the transition. After spending the winter with part of the 2nd Virginia in Suffolk, Scott was chosen by the Second Continental Congress as colonel of the 5th Virginia Regiment on August 12, 1776; he replaced Colonel William Peachy, who had resigned. The 5th Virginia was stationed in the cities of Hampton and Portsmouth through the end of September. They were then ordered to join George Washington in New Jersey, eventually repairing to the city of Trenton in November.

Serving as part of Adam Stephen's brigade, Scott's 5th Virginia Regiment fought in the American victory at the December 26 Battle of Trenton. During the subsequent Battle of the Assunpink Creek on January 2, 1777, the 5th Virginia helped slow the advance of a combined force of British light infantry and Hessian soldiers toward Trenton. Major George Johnston, an officer of the 5th Virginia, opined that Scott had "acquired immortal honor" from his performance at Assunpink Creek. Following these battles, Washington's main force prepared to spend the winter at Morristown, New Jersey, while Scott's regiment was based at nearby Chatham. From this base, he led light infantry raids against British foraging parties. In his most notable engagement – the February 1 Battle of Drake's Farm – he performed well against a superior combination of British and Hessian soldiers. Scott led another notable raid against a large British force of about 2,000 troops at the February 8 Battle of Quibbletown.

=== Philadelphia campaign ===
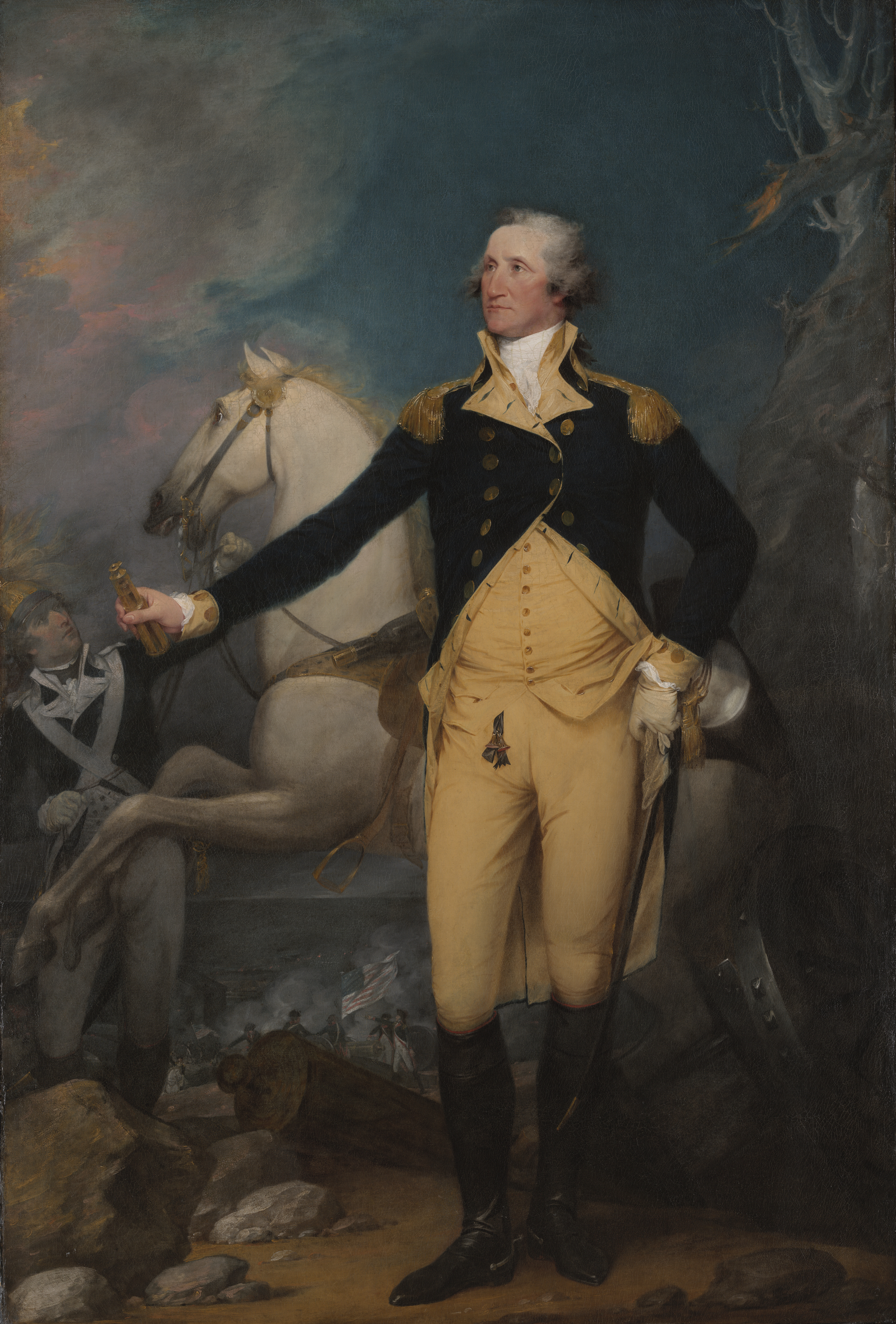
George Washington, commander of American forces during the Philadelphia campaign

In March 1777, Scott returned to his Virginia farm, taking his first furlough in more than a year. In recognition of his service with Washington, Congress commissioned him a brigadier general on April 2, 1777. At Washington's request, he returned to Trenton on May 10, 1777. His 4th Virginia Brigade and another brigade under William Woodford constituted the Virginia division, commanded by Adam Stephen, who had been promoted to major general. With Stephen and Brigadier General William Maxwell ill, Scott assumed temporary command of the division between May 19 and 24. Washington spent much of mid-1777 trying to anticipate and counter the moves of British General William Howe, and the lull in the fighting allowed Scott time to file a protest with Congress regarding how his seniority and rank had been calculated. After eight months of deliberation, Congress concurred with Scott's protest, placing him ahead of fellow brigadier general George Weedon in seniority.

At the September 11 Battle of Brandywine, the 4th Virginia Brigade stubbornly resisted the advance of General Charles Cornwallis, but was ultimately forced to retreat. Following the British victory, Howe marched toward Philadelphia, stopping briefly at Germantown. Scott persistently advocated for an attack on Howe's position at Germantown, and although he was initially in the minority among Washington's generals, he ultimately prevailed upon Washington to conduct the attack. On October 4, 1777, the 4th Virginia attacked the British in the Battle of Germantown. Due to their circuitous route to the battle, the field was already covered by heavy smoke from muskets and a fire set by the British in a dry buckwheat field when they arrived; the 4th Virginia and other American units became lost in the smoke and retreated.

After the American defeat at Germantown, Washington's troops took a position in the hills surrounding Whitemarsh, Pennsylvania, about 14 miles (23 km) from Philadelphia. Scott and four other generals initially favored an attack on Philadelphia in December, but after hearing Washington's assessment of the enemy's defenses there, they abandoned the idea. After a series of skirmishes with Howe's men near Whitemarsh, Washington's army camped for the winter at Valley Forge. Scott was afforded the luxury of boarding at the farm of Samuel Jones, about three miles from the camp, but rode out to inspect his brigade daily. Washington granted him a furlough in mid-March 1778, and he returned to Valley Forge on May 20, 1778.

When Washington and his men abandoned Valley Forge in mid-June 1778, Scott was ordered to take 1,500 light infantrymen and harass the British forces as they marched across New Jersey. On June 26, the Marquis de Lafayette joined Scott with an additional 1,000 men, in anticipation of a major offensive the next day. General Charles Lee was chosen to command the operation, which was delayed by one day due to inadequate communications and delays in forwarding provisions. Lee shared no battle plan with his generals, later claiming he had insufficient intelligence to form one. On the morning of June 28, Lee launched the attack, beginning the Battle of Monmouth. During the battle, Scott observed American artillerymen retreating. Not realizing that the men had only run out of ammunition, Scott believed the retreat was a sign of the collapse of the American offensive and ordered his men to retreat as well. Lacking a battle plan for guidance, William Maxwell and Anthony Wayne, whose units were fighting adjacent to Scott's men, also ordered a retreat. With such a great number of his men retreating, Lee fell back and eventually aborted the offensive. Although Washington's main force arrived and stopped the British advance, Scott's retreat was partially blamed for giving them control of the battle. Tradition holds that, in the aftermath of the battle, Scott witnessed Washington excoriating Lee in a profanity-laden tirade, but biographer Harry M. Ward considered it unlikely that Scott was present at the meeting. Lee was later court-martialed for the retreat and suspended from command.

Following the Battle of Monmouth, the British retreated to New York City. On August 14, Scott was given command of a new light infantry corps organized by Washington. He also served as Washington's chief of intelligence, conducting constant scouting missions from the Americans' new base at White Plains, New York. While Scott's men engaged in a few skirmishes with British scouting parties, neither Washington's army nor the British force at New York City conducted any major operations before Scott was furloughed in November 1778.

=== Service in the southern theater and capture ===
A March 1779 letter from Washington to Scott, still on furlough in Virginia, ordered him to recruit volunteers in Virginia and join Washington at Middlebrook on May 1. Men and supplies proved difficult to obtain, delaying Scott's return; during the delay, Washington ordered the recruits to South Carolina to join Benjamin Lincoln, who was in command of the militia forces there. Reports of significant British troop movements toward Georgia had convinced Washington that the enemy was preparing an invasion from the south.

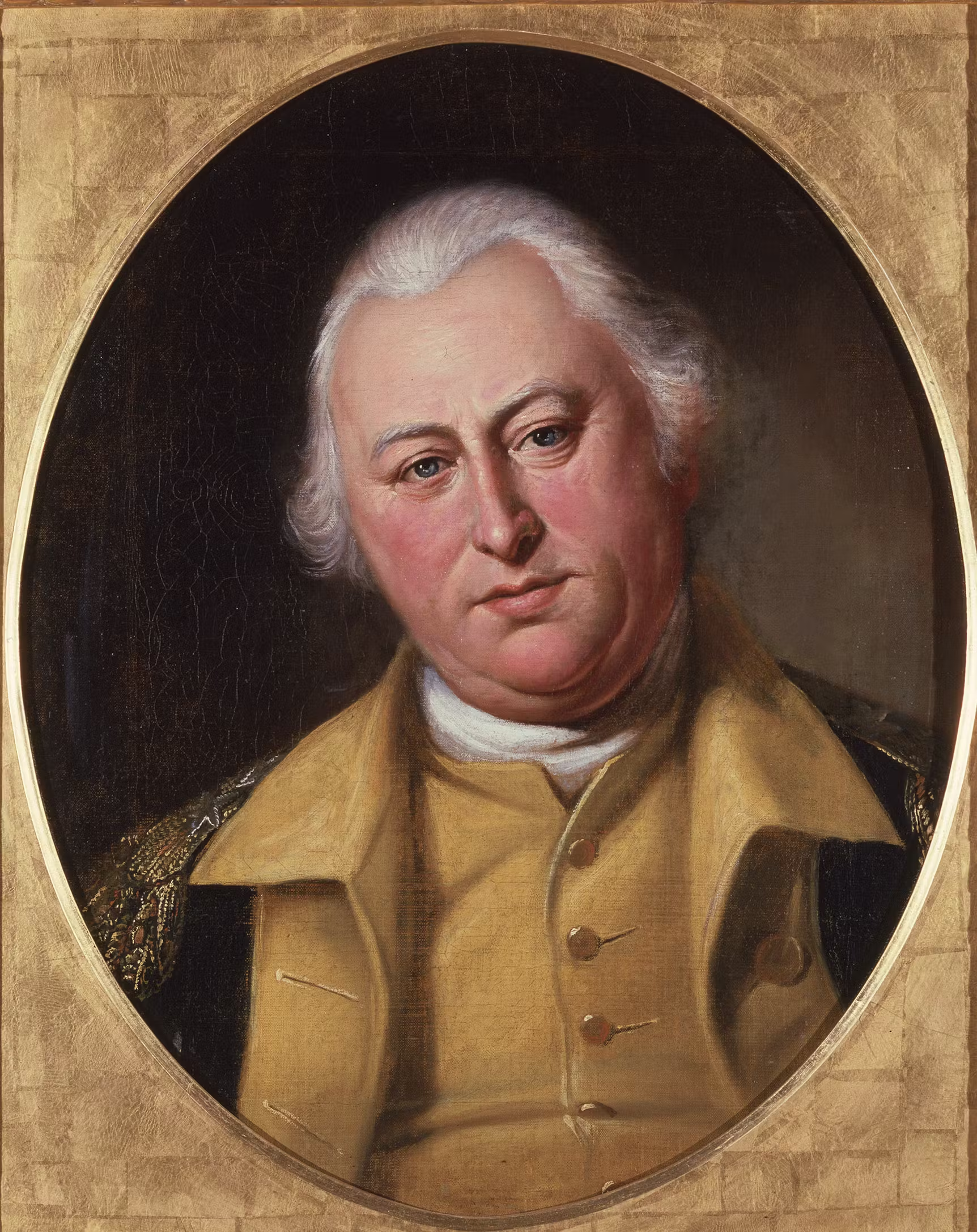
Benjamin Lincoln, commander of the forces at Charleston, South Carolina

Soon after Washington's orders were delivered, a British raiding party under George Collier and Edward Mathew arrived in Virginia to capture or destroy supplies that might otherwise be sent southward to aid the reinforcements going to South Carolina. Scott's orders changed again; the Virginia House of Delegates ordered him to immediately prepare defenses against Collier and Mathew's raids. When it became clear to both the legislature and Washington that Collier and Mathew intended only to raid supplies, not to invade, they concluded that the local militia would be able to sufficiently protect Virginia's interests and that Scott should continue to recruit men to reinforce the south. The legislators presented him with a horse, a firearm, and 500 pounds sterling for his quick response to the threat.

Scott's recruiting difficulties in Virginia continued, despite the implementation of a draft by the state legislature. Finally, in October 1779, he forwarded troops sent to him from Washington's Northern Army on to Lincoln in South Carolina, fulfilling his quota. He retained only Abraham Buford's regiment with him in Virginia. In February 1780, about 750 men sent by Washington under William Woodford arrived at Scott's camp in Petersburg, Virginia. Virginia authorities, fearing that the British army to the south under General Henry Clinton would turn north to Virginia, detained Scott and Woodford until it was clear that Clinton's object was Lincoln's position at Charleston, South Carolina.

On March 30, 1780, Scott arrived in Charleston just as Clinton's army was laying siege to the city. He was captured when the city surrendered to the British on May 12, 1780, and was held as a prisoner of war at Haddrell's Point near Charleston. Although a prisoner of war, Scott was given freedom to move within a six-mile radius and was allowed to correspond and trade with acquaintances in Virginia. With the death of William Woodford on November 13, 1780, he became primarily responsible for the welfare of the Virginia troops at Haddrell's Point. He requested his parole on account of ill health on January 30, 1781, and in late March, Charles Cornwallis granted the request.

In July 1782, Scott was exchanged for Lord Rawdon, ending his parole. Washington informed him that he was back on active duty and ordered him to assist General Peter Muhlenberg's recruiting efforts in Virginia, then to report to General Nathanael Greene. Greene wrote that he did not have a command for Scott, and requested that he remain with Muhlenberg in Virginia. The few troops he was able to recruit were sent to a depot at Winchester, Virginia. When the preliminary articles of peace between the United States and Great Britain were signed in March 1783, recruiting stopped altogether. Scott was brevetted to major general on September 30, 1783, just prior to his discharge from the Continental Army. Following the war, he became one of the founding members of the Society of the Cincinnati.

== Settlement in Kentucky and early political career ==
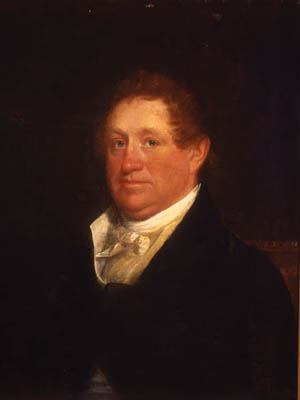
Peyton Short accompanied Scott to Kentucky in 1785.

In October 1783, the Virginia Legislature authorized Scott to commission superintendents and surveyors to survey the lands given to soldiers for their service in the Revolutionary War. Enticed by glowing reports of Kentucky by his friend, James Wilkinson, he arranged for a cabin to be built for him near the Kentucky River, although the builder apparently laid only the cornerstone. Scott first visited Kentucky in mid-1785. Traveling with Peyton Short, one of Wilkinson's business partners, he came to Limestone (present-day Maysville, Kentucky) via the Monongahela and Ohio Rivers. Scott and Short then traveled overland to the Kentucky River to examine the land they would later claim. Scott's stay in Kentucky was a short one; he had returned to his farm in Virginia by September 1785.

On his return to Virginia, Scott employed Edward Carrington, former quartermaster general of the Southern Army, to set his financial affairs in order in preparation for a move to Kentucky. Carrington purchased Scott's Virginia farm in 1785, but allowed the family to live there until they moved to the frontier. In 1787, Scott settled near the city of Versailles, Kentucky. Between his military claims and those of his children, the Scott family was entitled to 21,035 acres (8,513 ha) in Fayette and Bourbon counties. Scott constructed a two-story log cabin, a stockade, and a tobacco inspection warehouse. In June 1787, Shawnee warriors killed and scalped his son, Samuel, while he was crossing the Ohio River in a canoe; the elder Scott watched helplessly from the riverbank. Although a small party of settlers pursued the Shawnees back across the river, they were not able to overtake them. In volume three of Theodore Roosevelt's The Winning of the West, he stated that Scott "delighted in war" against the Indians after the death of his son.

Scott focused on the development of his homestead as a way to deal with the grief of losing his son. The settlement became known as Scott's Landing, and Scott briefly served as a tobacco inspector for the area. Determined to make Scott's Landing the centerpiece of a larger settlement called Petersburg, he began selling lots near the settlement in November 1788. Among those who purchased lots were James Wilkinson, Abraham Buford, Judge George Muter, and future Congressman and Kentucky Governor Christopher Greenup.

Scott was one of 37 men who founded the Kentucky Society for the Promotion of Useful Knowledge in 1787. Although he did not participate in any of the ten statehood conventions that sought to separate Kentucky from Virginia, he supported the idea in principle. When Woodford County was formed from the part of Fayette County that included Scott's fledgling settlement, Scott declined appointment as the new county's lieutenant. He consented to be a candidate to represent the county in the Virginia House of Delegates. During his single term, he served on the committee on privileges and election and on several special committees, including one that recommended that President George Washington supply a military guard at Big Bone Lick to facilitate the establishment of a saltworks there.

== Northwest Indian War ==
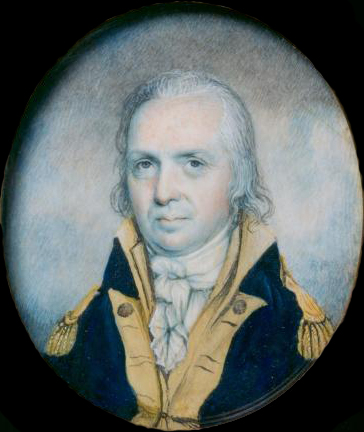
Josiah Harmar's failed campaign convinced Kentuckians that only local militia could effectively fight the Indians of the Northwest Territory.

As tensions mounted between the Indians in the Northwest Territory and settlers on the Kentucky frontier, President Washington began sanctioning joint operations between federal army troops and local frontier militia against the Indians. In April 1790, Scott raised a contingent of volunteers from Bourbon and Fayette counties to join Josiah Harmar in a raid against the Western Confederacy along the Scioto River in what would become the U.S. state of Ohio. The combined force of regulars and militia departed from Limestone on April 18, 1790, crossing the Ohio River and marching to the upper Scioto. From there, they headed south, toward the present-day city of Portsmouth, Ohio, and discovered an abandoned Indian camp. Fresh footprints, including those of a well-known Shawnee warrior – nicknamed Reel Foot because of his two club feet – led away from the camp site. Scott sent a small detachment to follow the tracks; ultimately, they discovered, killed, and scalped four Shawnees, including Reel Foot. Other than this, the expedition accomplished nothing, and it disbanded on April 27, 1790.

In June 1790, Harmar and Arthur St. Clair were ordered to lead another expedition against the Indians. Harmar had hoped that Scott, Isaac Shelby, or Benjamin Logan would join the campaign and lead the Kentucky militia, but all three declined. Scott had been elected to represent Woodford County in the Virginia General Assembly, and his legislative duty prevented his service. He believed that the Kentucky militiamen would only serve under Colonel Robert Trotter, a veteran of Logan's earlier Indian fighting campaigns. Ultimately, command of the Kentucky militiamen was given to Major John Hardin, and many militiamen refused to join the campaign, just as Scott had predicted. During the expedition, Scott's son, Merritt, who was serving as a captain in the Woodford County militia, was killed and scalped. The entire expedition was a failure, and it solidified the Kentucky militiamen's strong distrust of Harmar; most vowed never to fight alongside him again.

During Harmar's Campaign, Scott was serving in the state legislature in Richmond, Virginia. He was once again appointed to the committee on privileges and election. He also served on the committee on propositions and grievances and several special committees. On December 30, 1790, Virginia Governor Beverley Randolph, possibly acting on a recommendation from Washington, appointed Scott brigadier general in the Virginia militia and gave him command of the entire District of Kentucky. His primary responsibility was overseeing a line of 18 outposts along the Ohio River. In January 1791, President Washington accepted U.S. Senator John Brown's suggestion to appoint a Kentucky Board of War, composed of Brown, Scott, Isaac Shelby, Harry Innes, and Benjamin Logan. The committee was empowered to call out local militia to act in conjunction with federal troops against the Indians. They recommended assembling an army of volunteers to locate and destroy Indian settlements north of the Ohio River. Later that month, Washington approved a plan to invade the Indians' homelands via a raid from Fort Washington (near present-day Cincinnati, Ohio). Most Kentuckians were displeased with Washington's choice of Arthur St. Clair, by then suffering from gout and unable to mount his own horse unassisted, as overall commander of the invasion. Scott was chosen to serve under St. Clair as commander of the 1,000 militiamen who took part in the invasion, about one-third of the total force.

=== Blackberry Campaign ===
Washington ordered Scott to conduct a series of preliminary raids in mid-1791 that would keep the enemy occupied while St. Clair assembled the primary invasion force. Both Isaac Shelby and Benjamin Logan had hoped to lead the campaign, and neither would accept a lesser position. Shelby nevertheless supported the campaign, while Logan actively opposed it. Scott issued a call for volunteers to assemble at Frankfort, Kentucky, on May 15, 1791, to carry out these raids. Kentuckians responded favorably to the idea of an all-militia campaign, and 852 men volunteered for service, although Scott was only authorized to take 750; Senator John Brown was among the volunteers. After a brief delay to learn the fate of a failed diplomatic mission to the Miami tribes in the Northwest Territory, Scott's men departed from Fort Washington on May 24. The militiamen crossed the Ohio toward a clutch of Miami, Kickapoo, Wea, and Potawatomi settlements near the location of present-day Lafayette, Indiana. For eight days, they crossed rugged terrain and were bedraggled by frequent rainstorms. The harsh conditions spoiled the militia's supplies, and they resorted to gathering the blackberries that were growing in the area; for this reason, the expedition earned the nickname the "Blackberry Campaign".

As Scott's men reached an open prairie near the Wea settlement of Ouiatenon on June 1, they were discovered by an enemy scout and hurried to attack the villages before the residents could react. When the main force reached the villages, they found the residents hurriedly fleeing across the Wabash River in canoes. Aided by cover fire from a Kickapoo village on the other side of the river, they were able to escape before Scott's men could attack. The river was too wide to ford at Scott's location, so he sent a detachment under James Wilkinson in one direction and a detachment under Thomas Barbee in the other to find a place to ford the river. Wilkinson did not find a suitable location, but located and killed a small band of Indians before returning. Barbee located a crossing and conducted a brief raid against the Indians on the other side before returning to Scott. The next morning, Scott's main force burned the nearby villages and crops, while a detachment under Wilkinson set out for the settlement of Kethtippecannunk. The inhabitants of this village had fled across Eel Creek, and after a brief and ineffective firefight, Wilkinson's men burned the city and returned to Scott. In his official report, Scott noted that many of Kethtippecannunk's residents were French and speculated that it was connected to, perhaps dependent upon, the French settlement of Detroit.

Low on supplies, Scott and his men ended their campaign. On the return trip, two men drowned in the White River; these were the only deaths among Scott's men. Five others were wounded but survived. In total, they had killed 38 Indians and taken 57 more prisoner. Scott sent 12 men ahead with the official report for Arthur St. Clair's review; the rest of the men arrived at Fort Steuben (present-day Clarksville, Indiana) on June 15. The next day, they recrossed the Ohio River and received their discharge papers at Louisville, Kentucky.

=== St. Clair expedition ===
Scott's Wabash Campaign was well-received both in Kentucky and by the Washington administration. On June 24, 1791, Arthur St. Clair encouraged the Board of War to organize a second expedition into the Wabash region and to remove their outposts along the Ohio River to free up manpower and finances as a prelude to his larger invasion. Scott questioned the wisdom of removing the outposts and convinced his fellow members of the Board of War to retain one at Big Bone Lick and one guarding an ironworks at the mouth of the Kentucky River. His instincts later proved to be right; a month later, Indian raiders tried to deny the frontier settlers access to salt by capturing Big Bone Lick, but they were repelled by the militia stationed at the outpost there. Scott also did not believe that 500 men, St. Clair's requested number for the second Wabash expedition, was sufficient for an effective operation.

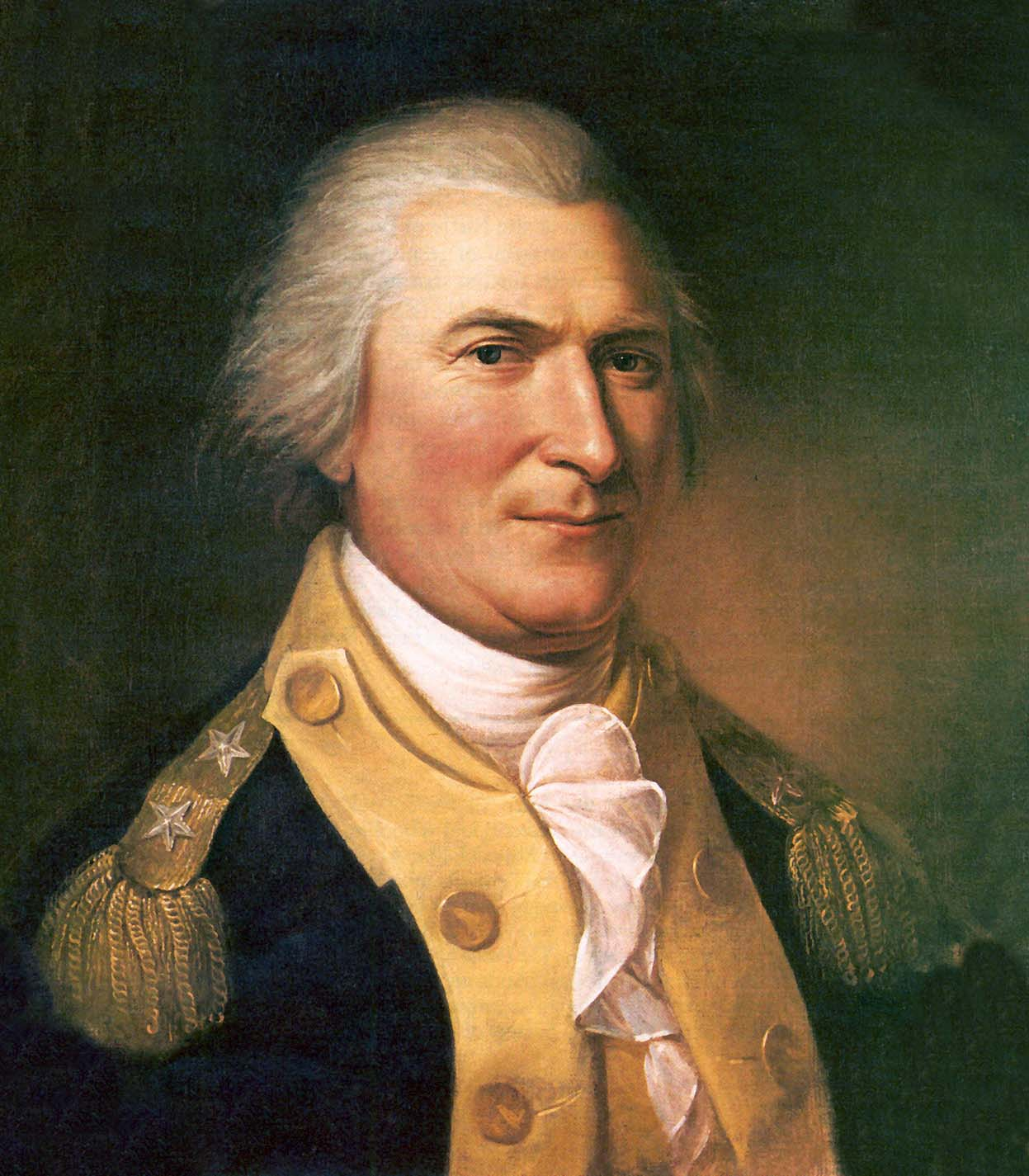
Arthur St. Clair led a failed expedition against the Northwest Indians in late 1791.

In July, Scott gave permission to Bourbon County resident John Edwards to lead 300 men against a band of Indians suspected of stealing horses on the Kentucky side of the Ohio River. Although Edwards' expedition almost reached the Sandusky River, they found only deserted villages. Unknown to the volunteers, they narrowly missed being ambushed by the Indians in the area. Many of the men who accompanied Edwards accused him of cowardice. Due to illness, Scott was unable to lead the expedition St. Clair requested; instead, he chose his friend, James Wilkinson, to lead it. Wilkinson's men departed on August 1. During their expedition, they destroyed the evacuated village of Kikiah (also called Kenapocomoco), the rebuilt settlement of Ouiatenon, a small Kickapoo village, and several other small settlements in the area. Returning by the same route that Scott's previous expedition had, Wilkinson's men were back in Kentucky by August 21. Scott's and Wilkinson's campaigns took a heavy toll on the Northwest Indians. In particular, the Weas and Kickapoos signed a peace treaty with the United States the following year, and the Kickapoos migrated farther into Illinois and Missouri.

St. Clair continued his preparations for invading the northwest despite the fact that, by now, he admitted he was unfit for combat due to his ill health. Like Harmar, he was also unpopular in Kentucky, and Scott had to conduct a draft to raise the militiamen needed for St. Clair's expedition. He and most other officers in Kentucky claimed they were too ill to lead the men; most actually feared losing the respect of Kentuckians through their association with St. Clair. Colonel William Oldham was the highest-ranking soldier willing to lead the Kentuckians.

St. Clair's party left Fort Washington on October 1. On November 3, he ordered his men to make camp on a small tributary of the Wabash River, mistakenly believing they were camping on the St. Marys River. His intent was for the men to construct some protective works the next day, but before sunrise, a combined group of Indian warriors attacked the party, routing them and capturing part of their artillery and most of their supplies. Of St. Clair's force of 1,000 men, 935 were killed, wounded or captured, destroying a quarter of the United States Army in a single day. The Kentucky militiamen scattered during the attack, and their leader, Colonel Oldham, was killed. Nevertheless, they and most citizens in Kentucky blamed St. Clair for the entire debacle. St. Clair retreated to Fort Washington, and on November 24, Scott joined him there with 200 mounted volunteers in case the Indians decided to pursue him and invade Kentucky. When it became apparent that no Indian invasion was imminent, Scott's men returned home. As a result of St. Clair's campaign, tribes that had previously been neutral in the conflict – including the Delawares and Wyandots – allied with the Miami and Shawnee against the frontiersmen.

=== Service with the Legion of the United States ===
After St. Clair's defeat, President Washington asked Congress to authorize the formation of the Legion of the United States, a 5,000-man force to fight the Indians in the Northwest. Congress approved the proposal in March 1792, and Scott learned from a friend in Philadelphia that he was being considered as commander of the Legion. Ultimately Washington concluded that he was "of inadequate abilities"; his known vice of drinking too much alcohol also concerned Washington. Instead, Washington chose "Mad" Anthony Wayne to command the Legion. On June 4, 1792 – just days after Kentucky officially gained statehood – the Kentucky General Assembly commissioned Scott and Benjamin Logan as major generals in the state militia. On June 25, Scott was given command of the militia's 2nd Division, which was charged with operating north of the Kentucky River; Logan's 1st Division operated south of the river.

The new state legislature had also appointed a five-man committee to select a city to be the new state capital. Scott applied to have Petersburg, still a fledgling settlement, designated as the capital. Other localities – including Frankfort, Lexington, Louisville, and Boonesborough – also applied. Frankfort was eventually chosen, as Scott's failure to secure Petersburg's designation as the state capital contributed more than anything else to the settlement's failure to even become a viable city. Scott's son, Charles Jr., wrote to his brother Daniel that their father was planning to run for Congress in 1792; although Charles Jr. expressed confidence that his father would be elected, his campaign apparently never materialized or faltered shortly after it began. He was chosen as a presidential elector in 1793.

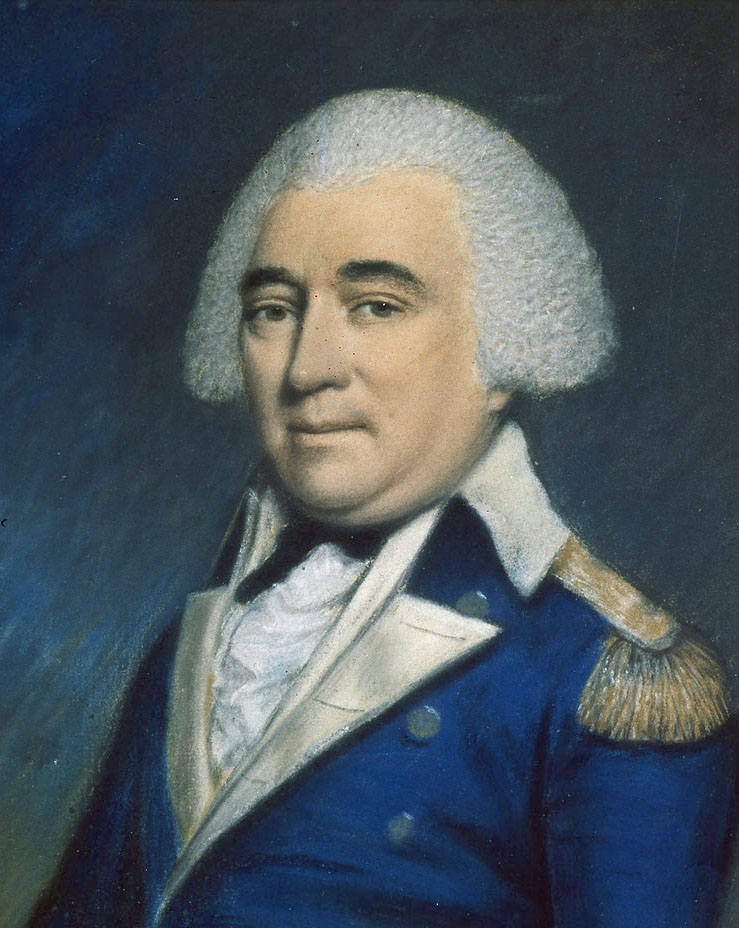
"Mad" Anthony Wayne, commander of the Legion of the United States

Wayne originally intended to use Kentucky militiamen in preemptive strikes against the Indians and to conduct the main invasion using only federal troops, but by the time he moved to Fort Washington in mid-1793, he had assembled fewer than 3,000 of the 5,000 troops he had anticipated. He now requested that Scott's and Logan's men join his main force. Logan flatly refused to cooperate with a federal officer, but Scott eventually agreed, and Wayne commissioned him an officer in the federal army on July 1, 1793. He and Governor Isaac Shelby instituted a draft to raise the 1,500 troops he was to command in Wayne's operation. When he joined Wayne at Fort Jefferson on October 21, 1793, he had only been able to raise 1,000 men.

On November 4, Wayne ordered Scott's militiamen to destroy a nearby Delaware village. Still resentful and distrustful of federal officers and aware that Wayne would not launch a major offensive so close to winter, the men were not enthusiastic about the mission, which many of them considered trivial. That night, 501 of them deserted their camp, though Wayne noted in his report that he believed Scott and his officers had done all they could do to prevent the desertions. Scott attempted to continue the mission with his remaining men, but inclement weather prevented him from conducting a major offensive. Ultimately, the men were only able to disperse a small hunting camp before continuing on to Fort Washington and mustering out on November 10. Wayne ordered Scott to return with a full quota of troops after the winter.

Tensions cooled between Wayne and the Kentuckians over the winter of 1793–94. Wayne noticed that, despite their obstinance, the Kentucky volunteers appeared to be good soldiers. The militiamen, after observing Wayne, concluded that he – unlike Harmar and St. Clair – knew how to combat the Indians. Wayne augmented his popularity in Kentucky by building Fort Recovery over the winter on the site of St. Clair's defeat. The Indians' victory over St. Clair had become a part of their lore and inspired them to continue the fight against the western settlers; Wayne's construction of a fort on this site was a blow to the Indian psyche, and his re-burial of some 600 skulls that the Indians had dug up and scattered across the area was popular with Kentuckians, since many of their own were among the dead. While Scott came to respect Wayne personally, his friend, James Wilkinson, began an anonymous campaign to tarnish Wayne's image, coveting command of the Northwest expedition for himself. Scott, on leave in Philadelphia at the time, wrote to Secretary of War Henry Knox to defend Wayne's reputation, breaching his friendship with Wilkinson.

Scott returned to Kentucky from Philadelphia in June 1794, mustered 1,500 militiamen, and joined Wayne at Fort Greeneville on July 27. He and Thomas Barbee led this force in support of Wayne's 1,000 regular troops. The combined force marched quickly and captured the recently evacuated Indian town of Grand Glaize on August 8. Here, Wayne ordered the construction of Fort Defiance, which took approximately a week. Scott was responsible for the naming of the fort; while observing its construction, he declared, "I defy the English, Indians, and all the devils in hell to take it." Based upon intelligence provided by Scott's mounted volunteers, Wayne ordered his force to march toward British-held Fort Miami on August 14, anticipating a battle with a combined British and Indian force of 2,400 men there. About 8:45 a.m. on August 20, Major William Price's brigade of volunteers engaged the Indian force near Fort Miami, beginning the Battle of Fallen Timbers. The well-positioned Indian force turned back Price's men, but Wayne ordered his regulars to conduct a vigorous bayonet charge, which routed the Indians. Wayne's force won a decisive victory, while Major William Campbell, the commander of Fort Miami, refused to open the fort to Indian warriors who attempted to enter it, as he did not want to start a war with United States.

Following the battle, Wayne ordered Scott's volunteers to conduct numerous raids within a fifty-mile radius of their position. Due to a lack of pack horses in Wayne's force, the mounted volunteers were also employed transporting supplies between forts throughout September 1794. They eventually grew weary of garrison duty and complained that the use of their personal horses to transport goods had injured the animals. Many threatened to mutiny if they were not discharged. On October 13, 1794, Wayne finally ordered them home. In a commendation of Wayne issued on December 4, 1794, the U.S. House of Representatives specifically thanked Scott and his men for their service at the Battle of Fallen Timbers. The Treaty of Greenville formally ended the war in mid-1795.

== Later political career ==
In 1795, Scott traveled to Philadelphia to help clarify service records that would determine the final pay of the men who served under him before returning to his farm in Kentucky. He continued to serve, nominally, as major general of the 2nd militia division of the state militia until 1799. Celebrations of Scott's military heroism were held all over Kentucky, sparking his interest in a political career. With the advent of the First Party System, he declared himself a Democratic-Republican, as did most Kentuckians. In 1800, he was chosen as a presidential elector for his district by a vote of 75 to 44 over Caleb Wallace. Scott and his fellow electors all cast their votes for the ticket of Thomas Jefferson and Aaron Burr.

In 1803, Secretary of War Henry Dearborn appointed Scott and Governor James Garrard to evaluate sites in Kentucky on which to construct a replacement for Fort Washington. Garrard, a central Kentucky native, insisted that the fort should be built at Frankfort. Scott disagreed, contending that the fort should not be in the state's interior and that the hilly terrain around Frankfort was unsuitable for constructing a fort. He waited several days for an appointment with Garrard to try and reach an agreement, but when he was unable to secure one, he asked Dearborn for permission to act alone. Dearborn granted the request and accepted Scott's recommendation of a site in Newport, Kentucky. In 1804, Scott was again chosen a presidential elector with minimal opposition.

In 1797, Scott's son Daniel, who had settled in Virginia, died. In late 1799 or early 1800, his last son, Charles Jr., also died. His daughter Martha married future U.S. Senator George M. Bibb in 1799 and moved to Daviess County. Daughter Mary had married and left the farm prior to Scott's return from military service, and youngest daughter Nancy left the farm near the turn of the 19th century, although she never married. After the death of his wife on October 6, 1804, he moved in with his daughter and son-in-law, John and Mary Postlethwait, in Lexington. He sold his farm in Woodford County in October 1805.

As tensions between the U.S. and Britain escalated in the wake of the June 22, 1807, Chesapeake–Leopard affair, Scott applied to Governor Christopher Greenup to raise a mounted militia unit in anticipation of an outbreak of hostilities. Although Greenup granted the requested authorization, Scott remarried on July 25, 1807, and never assembled the militia unit. His second wife, Judith Cary (Bell) Gist, was the 57-year-old widow of Colonel Nathaniel Gist, who had been a prisoner of war with Scott during the Revolutionary War. After their marriage, they moved to Canewood, Gist's family's plantation in Bourbon and Clark counties.

=== Gubernatorial election of 1808 ===
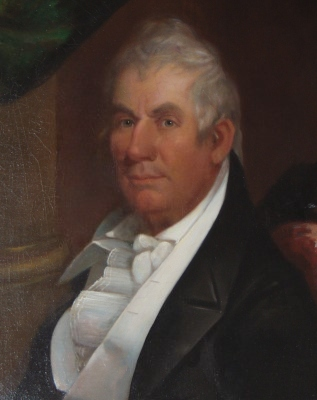
Green Clay, one of Scott's opponents in the 1808 gubernatorial election

As the celebrations in honor of Scott's military career continued across Kentucky, he began to consider the possibility of running for governor in 1808. By mid-1806, state senator Thomas Posey and Lexington lawyer Thomas Todd had already declared their candidacies. Posey had been chosen speaker pro tem of the state Senate and, with the death of Lieutenant Governor John Caldwell in 1804, had assumed the role of acting lieutenant governor and presiding officer in the Senate. He subsequently lost his senatorial re-election bid, but continued to act as lieutenant governor and preside over the Senate. His opponents claimed that since he was no longer a member of the Senate, he was not qualified to act as lieutenant governor; additionally, they charged that he was sympathetic to the hated Federalist Party, even though he self-identified as a Democratic-Republican. Although he was not successfully unseated as the Senate's presiding officer, the controversy diminished his chances in the 1808 election. In 1807, Todd removed himself from contention as well, accepting Governor Greenup's appointment to the Kentucky Court of Appeals.

Posey's diminished candidacy and Todd's exit from the race left only one major impediment to Scott's potential candidacy. A movement began in Kentucky to draft former Governor Isaac Shelby as a candidate for another term. Known as "Old King's Mountain" for his heroic role in the Revolutionary War Battle of King's Mountain, Shelby could match Scott's military appeal, and as a former delegate to Kentucky's statehood and constitutional conventions and a former governor, his political experience far exceeded Scott's. Ultimately Shelby declined to run, and Scott officially declared his candidacy on February 11, 1808. John Allen had by then declared his candidacy and Green Clay's announcement followed Scott's by about a month. Scott's campaign was managed by his stepson-in-law, Jesse Bledsoe, a law professor at Transylvania University. Bledsoe was among the most able politicians in the state, though he preferred the role of "kingmaker" to that of candidate.

Allen and Clay, both lawyers by profession, were hurt by a general distrust of lawyers by the Kentucky electorate. Further, Allen had served as general counsel for Aaron Burr, and several anonymous letters to the state's newspapers accused him of being privy to Burr's alleged scheme to create an independent state in the southwest. Henry Clay was among those who vigorously defended Allen from the charges. Scott also frequently spoke in highly complimentary terms of Allen. As a legislator, Green Clay pushed for measures favorable to debtors; he consequently enjoyed strong support from settlers south of the Green River, many of whom were squatters and land speculators who owed substantial debts to the state. To counter Scott's hero image, Clay supporters pointed to his service with George Rogers Clark in a 1782 expedition against the Shawnee, but the impact of this line of campaigning was minimal. As the most senior Revolutionary War officer in Kentucky, Scott became the recognized leader of the state's veterans' lobby. The Independence Day celebrations held around the state just before the August 1 election provided a boost for his campaign. On election day, he garnered 22,050 votes, compared to 8,430 votes for Allen and 5,516 votes for Clay.

=== Governorship ===
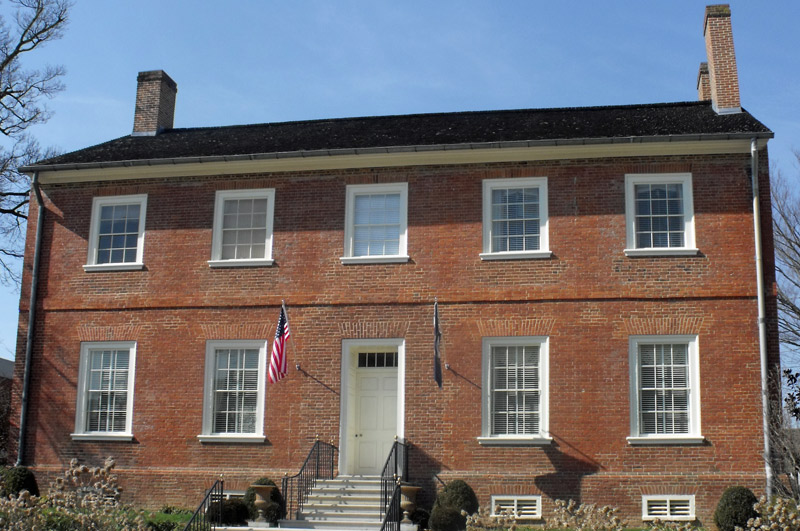
A fall on the icy steps of the governor's mansion crippled Scott for life.

Among Scott's first acts as governor was appointing Jesse Bledsoe as Secretary of State. Bledsoe delivered Scott's first address to the legislature on December 13, 1808. Later that winter, Scott was injured when he slipped on the icy steps of the governor's mansion; the injury left him confined to crutches for the rest of his life and rendered him even more dependent on Bledsoe to perform many of his official functions. His physical condition continued to worsen throughout his term as governor.

In domestic matters, Scott advocated increased salaries for public officials, economic development measures, and heavy punishments for persistent criminals. While he desired a tax code that would preclude the need for the state to borrow money, he encouraged legislators to keep taxes as low as possible. He also urged them to convert the militia into a youth army. The General Assembly routinely ignored his calls for reform but did pass a measure he advocated that allowed debtors a one-year stay on collection of their debts if they provided both bond and security.

Scott frequently clashed with the legislature, including once when the Senate refused to confirm the appointment of Dr. Walter Brashear as lieutenant colonel commandant of the state militia's second regiment. The governor refused to nominate anyone else for the position, saying that Brashear was the best person for it, and he assumed the senators would not want to be sent a worse nomination. He employed his gubernatorial veto three times over the course of his tenure, but all three were overridden by the legislature. Measures creating Harrison County and allowing squatters to purchase occupied land on more favorable terms were both vetoed because Scott felt that they had been passed too hastily to allow proper debate. Scott also vetoed the revocation of a pension granted to recently retired Kentucky Court of Appeals justice George Muter, because he felt it undermined citizens' confidence in the promises of their government.

Throughout his term, Scott was dogged by rumors of heavy drinking and frequent use of profanity. On one occasion, an unnamed individual believed his reputation had been injured by something Scott had said and challenged him to a duel. He ignored the challenge, after which the challenger threatened to expose him as a coward. Scott was supposed to have replied, "Post and be damned; but if you do, you will only post yourself a damned liar, and everybody else will say so." On another occasion, after reviewing a speech written for him by Bledsoe, the governor was said to have remarked, "Well, Mr. Bledsoe, I know you think you are a damned sight smarter than I am, and so you are in many respects; but this message as it is now, won't do at all; I'll be damned if it will." When Bledsoe asked what was wrong with the speech, he reportedly replied, "Why, damn it to hell, why don't you put a good solemn prayer at the end of it, and talk about Providence, and the protection of Heaven, and all that?" After the governor campaigned for Humphrey Marshall's opponent in the 1809 legislative elections, Marshall published an article in the Western World newspaper that accused him of appearing in front of the court house drunk on election day.

For most of Scott's tenure as governor, tensions between the U.S. and Britain escalated. Sentiment in favor of a U.S. declaration of war against the British was particularly strong in Kentucky. Most Kentuckians resented the replacement of the Embargo Act of 1807 with the weaker Non-Intercourse Act of 1809 and Macon's Bill Number 2. Kentucky Senator Henry Clay became the acknowledged leader of the war hawks in Congress. During an address to the General Assembly on December 4, 1810, Scott expressed little hope of peacefully resolving U.S. grievances with Britain. He reminded the General Assembly that France had also violated the United States' maritime rights and urged equal treatment of the two countries for their offenses.

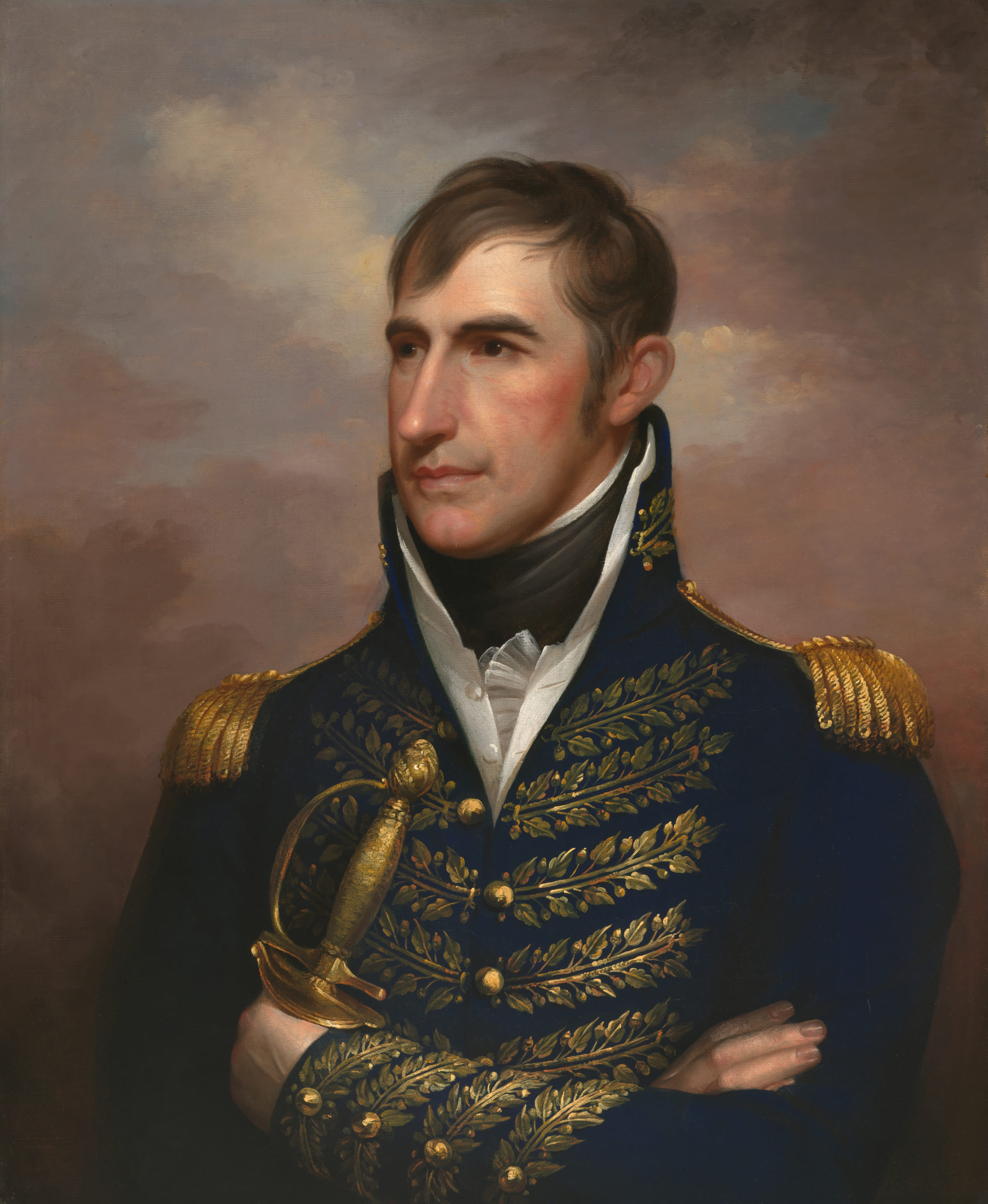
William Henry Harrison, supreme commander of the Army of the Northwest

In September 1811, William Henry Harrison, then governor of Indiana Territory, visited Kentucky and directed Colonel Samuel Wells to recruit Kentuckians for a new federal regiment then being formed by the authority of Secretary of War William Eustis. Harrison had not applied to Scott for permission to recruit in the state, and many Kentuckians – from Scott's political enemy, Humphrey Marshall, to his trusted advisor, Jesse Bledsoe – perceived this as a slight to the governor. Ignoring Bledsoe's indignation, Scott refused to make an issue of the faux pas and instead became one of the staunchest supporters of Harrison's rising career.

In November 1811, a messenger brought news to Kentucky of former Kentucky Attorney General Joseph Hamilton Daveiss's death at the Battle of Tippecanoe, amplifying Kentuckians' outcry for war with the British and Indians. In anticipation of a federal call for volunteers, Scott published messages in the state's newspapers in February and April 1812 whipping up support for the impending war effort. By the end of July, the state's quota of 5,500 volunteers had been met. On August 14, 1812, Scott greeted two regiments of soldiers at the governor's mansion just prior to their muster at Georgetown. He hobbled among the soldiers with his crutch, then turned and hammered it against the mansion's steps and was heard to mutter "If it hadn't been for you, I could have gone with the boys myself."

On August 25, 1812, Scott's last day in office, he appointed Harrison brevet major general over the Kentucky militia. The appointment was made on advice from incoming Governor Isaac Shelby and Henry Clay. The brevet ensured that Harrison, and not James Winchester – who was unpopular in Kentucky and with his own troops – would lead the state's military forces in the war. Biographer Harry M. Ward noted that Harrison's commission was unconstitutional both because he was not a citizen of the state and because the state militia's allotment of major generals had already been filled. Kentucky historian Lowell H. Harrison concurred that the commission was "probably illegal", but further noted that it was "acclaimed across the state". The show of confidence from Scott and his aides influenced President James Madison to appoint Harrison as supreme commander of the Army of the Northwest.

=== Death and legacy ===
Following his term as governor, Scott retired to his Canewood estate with his wife and youngest step-daughter, Mary Cecil Gist. Two of his stepdaughters had married during his term as governor. In 1809, Anna Maria Gist married Captain Nathaniel G. S. Hart, who was killed in the River Raisin Massacre in January 1813. Eliza Violet Gist married Francis Preston Blair on July 21, 1812, just prior to the expiration of Scott's term as governor. The governor opined that Blair, who was slightly built, stoop-shouldered, and suffering from tuberculosis, would leave Eliza a widow within six months. Blair survived the tuberculosis and went on to become a trusted advisor to President Andrew Jackson. He outlived Scott's prediction for him by more than sixty years.

By mid-1813, Scott's health had begun to fail rapidly. He died on October 22, 1813, and was buried on the grounds of Canewood. At the time of his death, he was one of the last surviving generals of the Revolutionary War. His remains were re-interred at Frankfort Cemetery in 1854. Scott County, Kentucky, and Scott County, Indiana, are named in his honor, as are the cities of Scottsville, Kentucky, and Scottsville, Virginia.

Political offices
Preceded by Christopher Greenup	Governor of Kentucky; 1808–1812	Succeeded by Isaac Shelby
