= Nathaniel G. S. Hart =

American lawyer from Lexington, Kentucky

- Born: circa 1784; Hagerstown, Maryland
- Died: January 23, 1813 (aged 29); Michigan
- Burial place: Detroit, Michigan (originally); Re-interred at State Cemetery/Frankfort Cemetery in Frankfort, Kentucky in 1834
- Relatives: Lucretia Hart Clay, Henry Clay
- Military career
- Allegiance: United States
- Service years: 1812–13
- Rank: Captain
- Unit: Lexington Light Infantry
- Commands: Lexington Light Infantry; Deputy Inspector for Left Wing of Northwestern Army
- Conflicts: War of 1812: Battle of Frenchtown, Battle of River Raisin

Nathaniel Gray Smith Hart (Note: Although some sources list Hart's name as "Nathaniel G. T. Hart," this is incorrect according to historian John E. Kleber writing in The Kentucky Encyclopedia and to historians David and Jeanne Heidler's Encyclopedia of the War of 1812. Also, Hart is referred to in a court document dating from shortly before his death as "Nathaniel G. S. Hart." The misnomer apparently dates to a mistake in Historical Sketches of Kentucky, either the Richard Collins edition (published in 1874) or the original edition (published in 1848 by Lewis Collins).) (c. 1784 – January 23, 1813) was a Lexington, Kentucky lawyer and businessman, who served with the state's volunteer militia during the War of 1812. As Captain of the Lexington Light Infantry from Kentucky, Hart and many of his men were killed in the River Raisin Massacre of January 23, 1813, after being taken prisoner the day before following the Battle of Frenchtown in Michigan Territory.

Hart was especially well-connected politically and socially. In addition to reading law with Henry Clay, Hart's sister Lucretia was married to Clay. Another sister of Hart named Ann was married to James Brown, a future ambassador to France. Hart's wife Anna Edward Gist was the stepdaughter of Charles Scott, Governor of Kentucky and through her Hart was the brother-in-law of James Pindell a member of the Society of Cincinnati. Many other members of Hart's Kentucky militia unit and its associated troops also came from the elite of Lexington and of the state. The men's deaths in the two Battles of Frenchtown, but especially in the subsequent Massacre captured state and national attention. The phrase "Remember the Raisin!" became an American call to arms for the duration of the War.

== Personal life ==
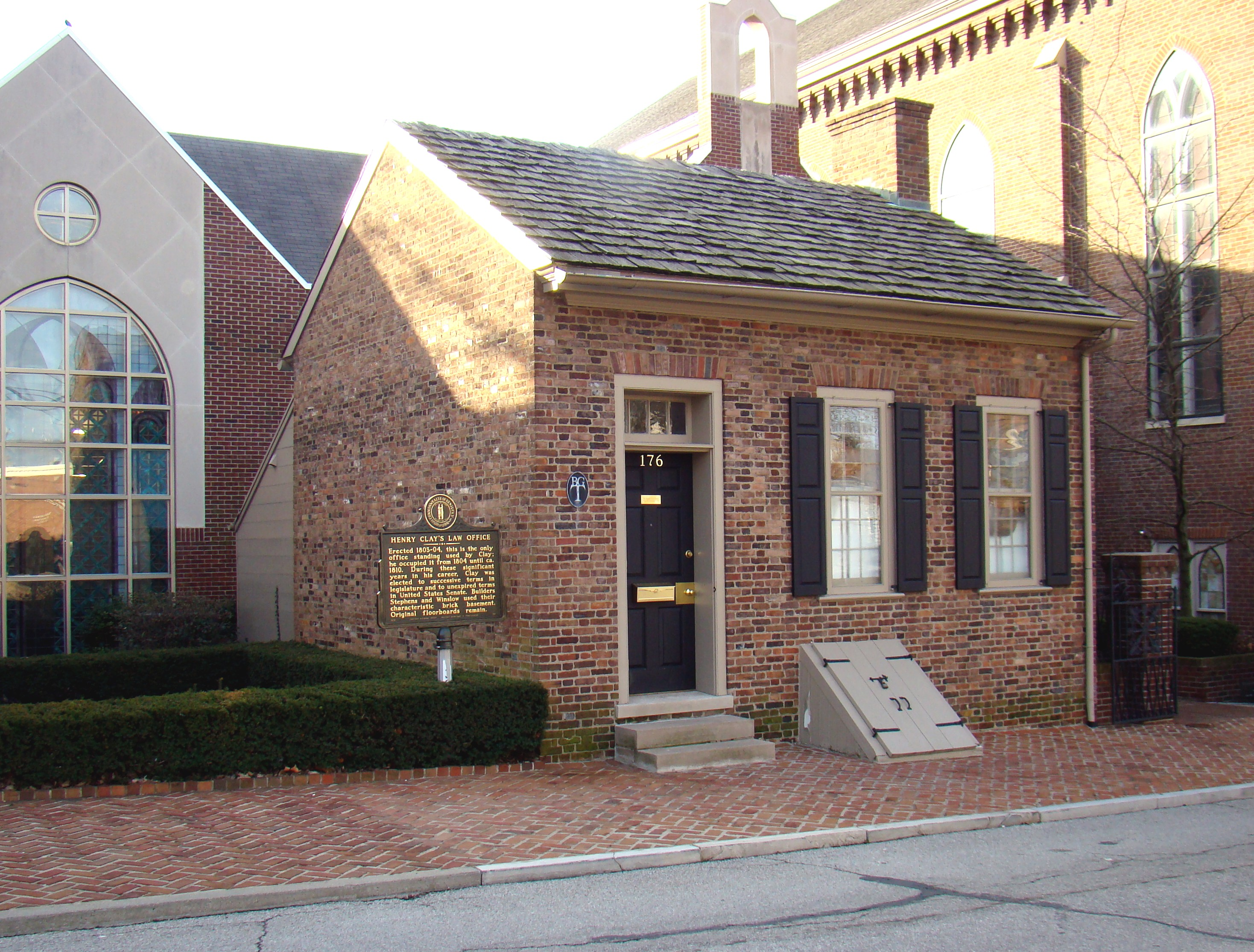
Henry Clay's law office in Lexington

Born around 1784 Nathaniel Hart was one of seven children, the second son of Colonel Thomas Hart, a veteran of the Revolutionary War, and his wife Susanna (Gray) Hart.

Originally from North Carolina, the family had moved to Hagerstown, Maryland, where Nathaniel was born. In 1794 they settled in Lexington, Kentucky as part of the postwar migration west. His father was a highly successful businessman, achieving wealth. Hart's four sisters married men who achieved some renown: Ann married the future US Senator James Brown (who subsequently served as Minister to France); Eliza married the surgeon Dr. Richard Pindell (a member of the Society of the Cincinnati); Susanna married the lawyer Samuel Price, and Lucretia married Henry Clay, future US Senator and Secretary of State.

Hart attended Princeton College, where his classmates included William Elliott from western Ontario. Elliott's father was a Loyalist who had resettled in Canada after the Revolutionary War. The two young men were close enough that Elliot stayed with Hart's parents for a time to recover from a serious illness.

After Hart's return to Lexington, he read law under Henry Clay, passed the bar, and set up a law practice in the city. Like his father, he became a successful businessman, a ropewalk (hemp rope factory) in the city being among his ventures. Hemp was a commodity crop of central Kentucky. In April 1809, Hart married Anna Edward Gist, the stepdaughter of General Charles Scott, governor of Kentucky, and daughter of Judith Cary Gist Scott and her late husband General Nathaniel Gist. Hart and Anna had two sons, Thomas Hart Jr. and Henry Clay Hart. On January 7, 1812, Hart duelled with Samuel E. Watson at a location on the Indiana side of the Ohio River, near where Silver Creek emptied into the river. This was the site where Henry Clay had duelled with fellow state legislator Humphrey Marshall in 1809.

== Military service and death ==
At the start of the War of 1812, Hart was commissioned as Captain of the Lexington Light Infantry Company (aka "The Silk Stocking Boys") a volunteer unit of the Fayette County, Kentucky militia. He later served as either a Deputy Inspector or as Inspector General of William Henry Harrison's Army of the Northwest. (Note: Henry Clay (The papers of Henry Clay, Volume 1, Page 19) refers to Hart's rank as "Inspector General of the N.W.[Northwestern] Army.") Hart's command was attached to the Fifth Regiment of the Kentucky Volunteer Militia and left for the Northwest in August 1812, where it became part of Army of the Northwest under General James Winchester. In January 1813, a detachment was sent to the defense of Frenchtown, Michigan Territory as part of an effort to retake Detroit from the British. Frenchtown residents had sent word to the Americans asking for relief from an occupying force of the British and their Indian allies.

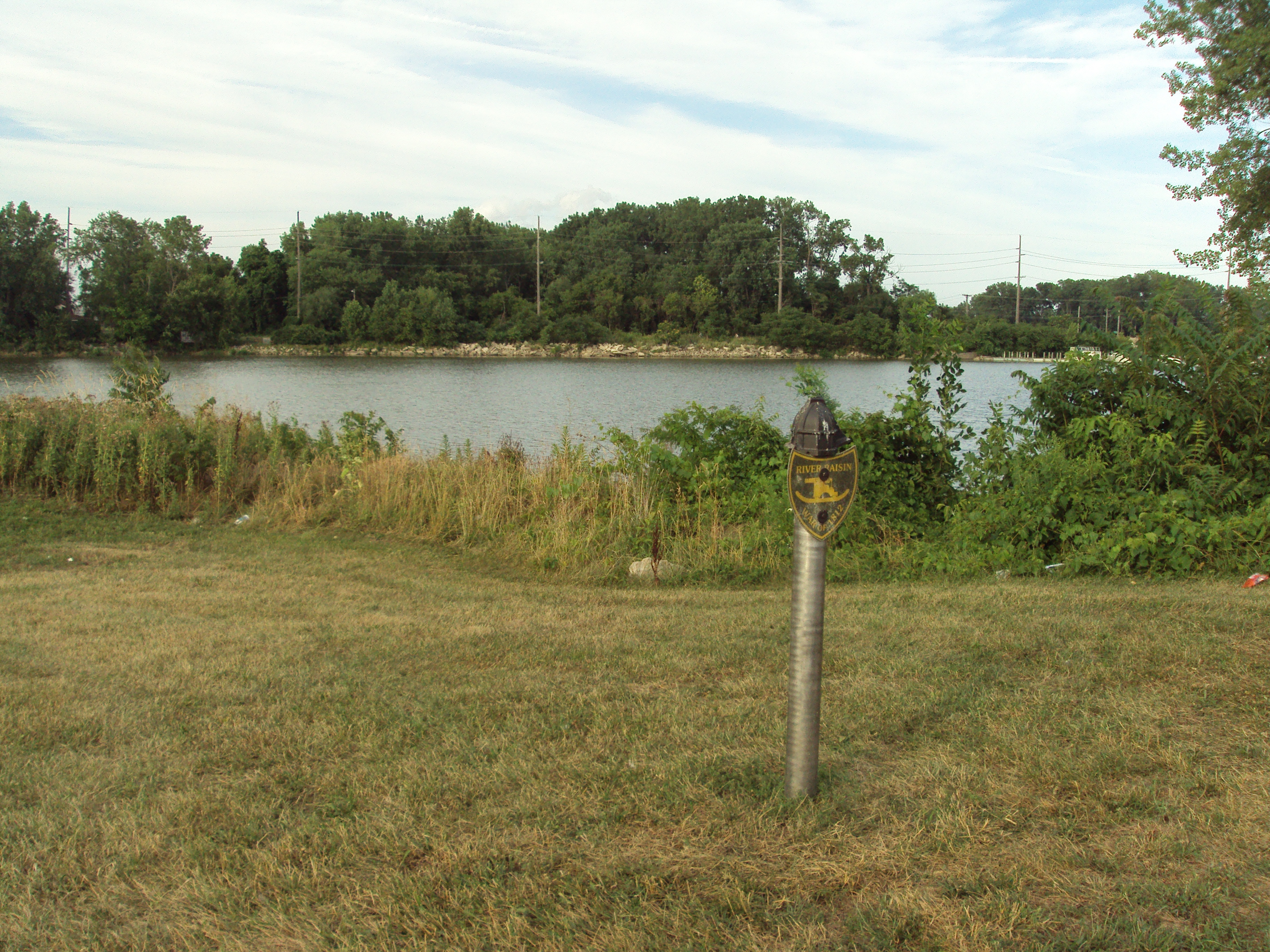
Lewis' River Raisin crossing – First Battle

During the First Battle of Frenchtown on January 18, 1813, the American forces under Lt. Colonel William Lewis were successful in forcing the retreat of the small British force stationed there. The British commander of the Fort Malden garrison in Amherstburg, Colonel Henry Procter, made plans to take back Frenchtown and he ordered troops to the area.

On the morning of January 22, 1813, Procter's forces, including hundreds of Indian warriors, attacked the American troops and overwhelmed the right flank of regulars under Winchester, forcing him and much of the general staff to surrender. The Kentucky militia under the command of Major George Madison on the left flank fought on and thought the flag of truce presented by the British was a flag of surrender. During this second Battle of Frenchtown, 397 Americans were killed. Hart was wounded and was among the 547 survivors who surrendered to Procter upon orders of Winchester. Not many more than 30 Kentucky troops escaped death or capture.

William Elliott, Hart's former Princeton classmate who had become a captain in the British Army, promised the wounded man safe passage to Fort Malden, (Note: According to Pierre Berton's War of 1812 (Page 406), Elliott's mother was Shawnee and he was raised among the Indians.) but did not carry out his pledge. Elliot borrowed a horse, bridle and saddle from American Major Benjamin Franklin Graves, promising to send help to the American wounded, but none arrived. Acting American captain William Caldwell wrote the next month that he heard Elliott tell General Winchester and Major Madison that "the Indians were very excellent surgeons (and ought to kill all the officers and men)." In one official letter, the eye-witness says that Elliott's broken promise included an offer to take Hart in Elliott's "own sleigh to Malden that evening" and that Hart could stay at Elliott's home for his recovery.

Unable to march with the able-bodied prisoners who were being directed to Fort Malden, Hart paid a friendly Indian to take him to the fort. Along the way they encountered other Indians, who shot and scalped Hart. Hart and an estimated 30–100 unarmed prisoners were killed by Indians on January 23, the day after the battle, in what became known as the River Raisin Massacre. (Note: Elliott reportedly said, "He tried to explain that it is impossible to restrain the Indians and (...) that they are simply seeking revenge for their own losses." (of Tippecanoe and Mississinewa).)

The high fatalities of the Americans in the Battle of Frenchtown and the subsequent Massacre of prisoners became fuel for pro-war political factions known as War Hawks, and for anti-British sentiment of the era. The phrase "Remember the Raisin!" entered the lexicon of the day as a flashpoint for popular sentiment, becoming a battle cry for American troops, especially the ones on the western frontier. The fact that many of the murdered men were well-known and well-connected members of Kentucky's elite increased the public outcry. Among the dead was Colonel John Allen, Henry Clay's law-partner and co-counsel in Aaron Burr's conspiracy trial at Frankfort. Hart's death is remembered in modern times as "The Murder of Captain Hart." Major Benjamin Franklin Graves of Lexington was another officer apparently killed while a prisoner of the Potawatomi, who were overseeing him and others marching to Detroit. Many American prisoners disappeared or were killed by Indians while being marched back to British-held territory.

== Aftermath of Hart's death and memorials ==
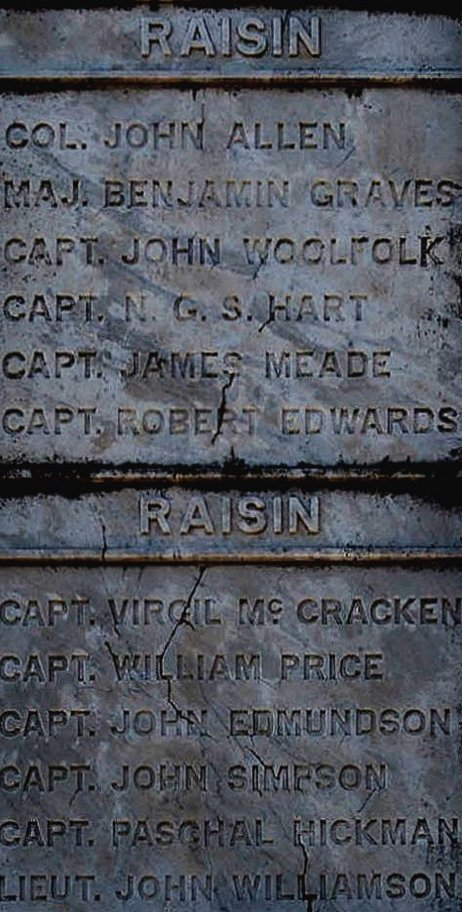
Names of some of the American officers who died at the Raisin Massacre or afterward, listed on one panel of the Kentucky War Memorial in Frankfort Cemetery in Frankfort, Kentucky

Owing to their high casualties and status as prisoners, surviving Americans were not able to properly bury their fallen comrades. The remains of the American dead at this site were not interred until months later. In 1818, the remains were transferred from Monroe, Michigan to Detroit. Isaac Baker, an American ensign who survived the Massacre and served as an official US Agent for the prisoners, stated in a report to General Winchester that:

The dead of our army are still denied the rites of sepulture. ... I was told the hogs were eating them. A gentleman told me he had seen them running about with skulls, arms, legs and other parts of the human system in their mouths. The French people on the Raisin buried Captains Hart, Woolfolk, and some others, but it was more than their lives were worth to have been caught paying this last customed tribute to mortality."

In 1834, the box containing the commingled American remains (including tomahawked skulls), were moved from their former Detroit resting-place and re-interred in Detroit's City Cemetery. These remains are asserted to have received final burial in the State Cemetery of Frankfort, Kentucky. As late as 1849, a mass grave from the battle was excavated during road construction in Monroe, which developed in the area of the battlefield. Some writers state that those skeletons, along with the City Cemetery remains, were returned to Kentucky for final and proper burial that year. (Note: According to Clift's Remember the Raisin! (Page xii), "Kentucky historians have written that these dead now rest in the state lots at Frankfort Cemetery. ... In the light of present day research, little has been found to substantiate these statements.") A 2004 archeological investigation at the State Monument found no evidence of remains from men of the River Raisin events.

Matthew Harris Jouett, a man who painted noted portraits of Thomas Jefferson, George Rogers Clark and Lafayette, was one of the Kentucky volunteers and among the survivors of the River Raisin Massacre. The company payroll of $6000 disappeared during the slaughter. Jouett restored the missing funds to the militia, based on his earnings as a painter. He also painted portraits of his fellow soldiers from memory, including Hart and Colonel Allen.

== Legacy and honors ==
- In 1819, the state of Kentucky named its 61st county as Hart County in Nathaniel Hart's honor.
- Hart was listed among officers on the Kentucky War Memorial in Frankfort Cemetery in the capital of Frankfort.
- In 1904 residents of Monroe, Michigan, which includes much of the area of the battlefield, erected a monument to the Kentuckians who died defending their settlement during the various River Raisin engagements. Some unidentified victims were buried here.
- In 2009, the River Raisin National Battlefield Park was established, the only such park to commemorate the War of 1812, and one of four battlefield parks in the nation. It had earlier been recognized as a state historic site and was previously listed on the National Register of Historic Places.

== See also ==
- Kentucky in the War of 1812
- John Allen (soldier)

== Sources ==
- Berton, Pierre (November 1, 2011). Pierre Berton's War of 1812: being a compendium of The invasion of Canada and Flames across the border (Paperback). Toronto: Anchor Canada. p. 406. ISBN 978-0385676489.
- Brannan, John (1823). Official Letters of the Military and Naval Officers of the United States, during the War with Great Britain in the years 1812, 13, 14, & 15s. Way & Gideon. pp. 135–136.
- Burcar, Colleen (2011). It Happened in Michigan: Remarkable Events That Shaped History. Guilford, Conn: Rowman & Littlefield, Globe Pequot Press. p. 18. ISBN 978-0-7627-6024-4.
- Clift, G. Glenn (2009) [1961]. Remember the Raisin! Kentucky and Kentuckians in the battles and massacre at Frenchtown, Michigan Territory, in the War of 1812 Remember the Raisin! reprinted with Notes on Kentucky veterans of the War of 1812 (Reprinted, two volumes in one ed.). Baltimore, Md: Clearfield by Genealogical Pub. Co. pp. 149–150. ISBN 978-0-8063-4520-8.
- Coles, Henry L. (1966). The War of 1812. Evanston, Illinois: University of Chicago Press. p. 116. ISBN 9780226113500.
- Collins, Lewis (1848). Historical sketches of Kentucky. Collins of Maysville, Kentucky & James of Cincinnati. p. 345.
- Connelley, William Elsey; Coulter, Ellis Merton (1922). History of Kentucky, Volume 3. The American Historical Society. p. 5. ISBN 9780598572981.
- Cook, Michael L.; Cummings, Bettie (1985). Fayette County, Kentucky Records. Vol. I (Hart vs. Benton Lawsuit August 22, 1812). Evansville, Indiana: Cook Publications. pp. 185–189.
- Farmer, Silas (1890). History of Detroit and Wayne County and early Michigan. S. Farmer & Co. for Muncell & Vo., New York. p. 280.
- Gardner, Charles Kitchell (1860). A Dictionary of All Officers: Who Have Been Commissioned, Or Have Been Appointed and Served, in the Army of the United States, Since the Inauguration of Their First President, in 1789, to the First January, 1853. New York, New York: D. Van Nostrand. p. 566.
- Greenblatt, Miriam; Bowman, John Stewart (2009). War of 1812. New York, NY: Infobase Publishing, Facts On File. p. 72. ISBN 978-1438100166.
- Heidler, David Stephen; Heidler, Jeanne T. (2004). Encyclopedia of the War of 1812. Annapolis, Maryland: Naval Institute Press. pp. 232–233. ISBN 1591143624.
- Hopkins, James F., Ed. (1959). The Papers of Henry Clay, Volume 1 (1797–1814). Lexington, Kentucky: University Press of Kentucky. p. 613.
- Kinkead, Elizabeth Shelby (1896). A history of Kentucky. American Book Company. p. 111.
- Kleber, John E. (1992). "Hart, Nathaniel Gray Smith". The Kentucky encyclopedia. Lexington, Kentucky: University Press of Kentucky. pp. 415–416. ISBN 978-0-8131-1772-0.
- Lossing, Benson John (1869). The Pictorial Field-book of the War of 1812: Or, Illustrations, by Pen and Pencil, of the History, Biography, Scenery, Relics, and Traditions of the Last War for American Independence (First ed.). Harper & Bros. pp. 358–359.
- Pennington, Estill Curtis; Miles, Ellen G. (2010). Lessons in Likeness: Portrait Painters in Kentucky and the Ohio River Valley, 1802–1920. Lexington, Kentucky: University Press of Kentucky. p. 172. ISBN 978-0-8131-2612-8.
- Ramage, James; Watkins, Andrea (2011). Kentucky Rising: Democracy, Slavery, and Culture from the Early Republic to the Civil War. Lexington, Kentucky: University Press of Kentucky. p. 105. ISBN 978-0813134406.
- Ranck, George Washington (1872). History of Lexington, Kentucky. R. Clarke. ISBN 9780608405292.
- Remini, Robert Vincent (January 22, 1992). Henry Clay: Statesman for the Union. New York, NY: W. W. Norton & Company. p. 29. ISBN 9780393030044.
- Smith, Zechariah Frederick; Clay, Mary Katherine (Rogers); Clay, Mary Rogers (1899). The Clay Family. J. P. Morton and company (Filson Club Publications, Number 14). p. 232.
- Watson, Robert P. (January 1, 2014). America's First Crisis: The War of 1812. Albany, NY: SUNY, Excelsior Editions Press. p. 113. ISBN 978-1438451343.
- Williams, Thomas John Chew (1992) [1906]. History of Washington County, Maryland: From the Earliest Settlements to the Present Time, Volume 1. Hagerstown, Md.: Clearfield Company & Family Line Pub. p. 427.
