= Muddy Creek Mill =

- U.S. National Register of Historic Places
- U.S. Historic district
- Virginia Landmarks Register
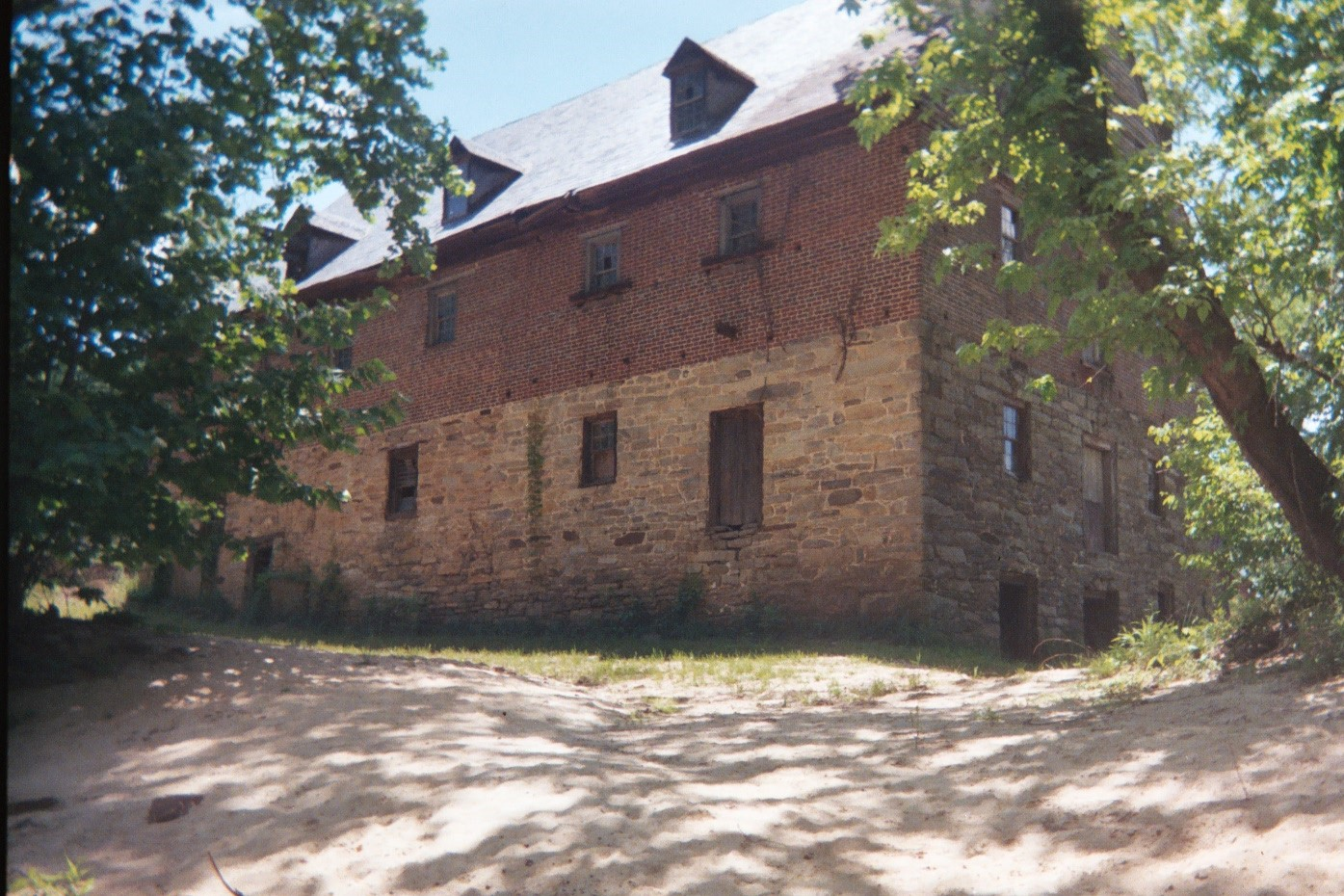
- Muddy Creek Mill, July 2007

- Location within Virginia Location within the United States
- Location: South of Cartersville off VA 684, Tamworth, Virginia
- Coordinates: 37°38′54″N 78°4′59″W
- Area: 17 acres (6.9 ha)
- Built: 1785
- NRHP reference No.: 74002114
- VLR No.: 024-0016

Significant dates
- Added to NRHP: October 09, 1974
- Designated VLR: June 18, 1974

Muddy Creek Mill is a historic grist mill complex and national historic district located in Tamworth, Cumberland County, Virginia. The district encompasses five contributing buildings and three contributing sites. The mill was built between 1785 and 1792, and is a large two-story structure with two half stories and rests on a down slope basement. It is constructed of sandstone, rubble masonry, and brick. Associated with the mill are a contributing brick store (c. 1800), early-19th century frame miller's house, late-18th century farmhouse and dairy, and the sites of a cooper's shop, blacksmith's shop and saw mill.

It was listed on the National Register of Historic Places in 1974.
