= Tamworth, Virginia =

Unincorporated community in Virginia, United States

- Hamlet
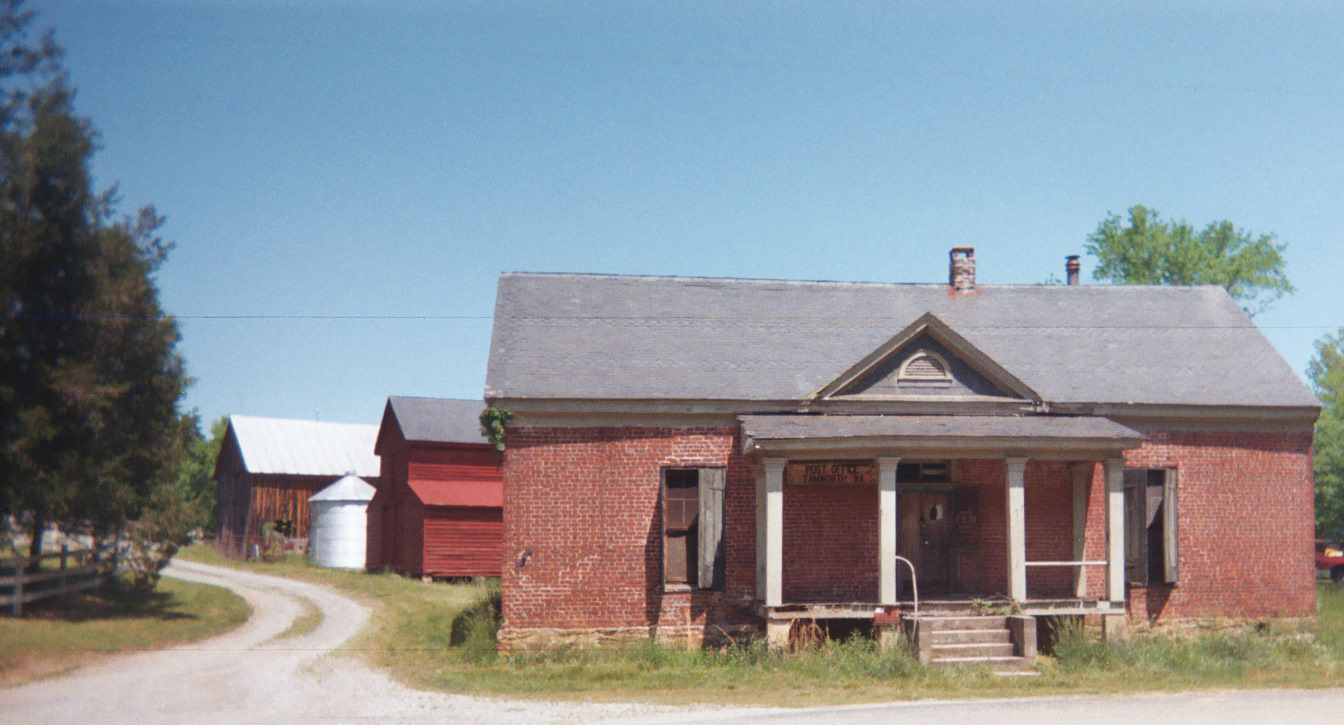
- Tamworth Post Office

- Location in Virginia Tamworth (the United States)
- Coordinates: 37°38′54″N 78°04′51″W
- Country: United States
- State: Virginia
- County: Cumberland
- Time zone: UTC−5 (Eastern (EST))
  - Summer (DST): UTC−4 (EDT)
- ZIP codes: 23027
- Area code: 804

Tamworth, founded in 1728, is an historical hamlet in Cumberland County, Virginia, United States, centered along Tamworth Road. In addition to farming, a gristmill and broad-crested weir on Muddy Creek comprised the principal economic activity. In addition to the mill, there are several other structures of historical interest dating from the 18th and 19th centuries: the miller's residence; a farmhouse; barns; assorted outbuildings; a post office; and Tamworth Cottage. All of the buildings are privately owned and are shown by appointment only.

== History ==
The gristmill is known alternatively as Muddy Creek Mills or later as Moon's Mill. The Mill was established in 1753 by Nicholas Davies and enlarged by Richard James in 1775. Operations at the mill ceased in the mid 1950s. The mill was added to the National Register of Historic Places in 1974.

The post office building (constructed 1792) also functioned as a general store and has been unused since the late 1980s when it was closed by the US Postal Service. The post office building features an ornately patterned slate-tiled roof.

Tamworth Cottage was initially constructed sometime between the first two phases of the mill construction (i.e. later half of the 18th century). It was moved during Mr Moon's tenure to its current location. The cottage was substantially enlarged and renovated in 1981.

In 2019, the film Harriet was filmed partially in Tamworth, with the mill featured prominently and several buildings having been constructed (slave quarters and a corn crib) for the set.

== Geography ==
Situated in the Virginia Piedmont in the northeast end of Cumberland County, Tamworth is drained by Muddy Creek, a tributary of the James River. Coordinates: 37.64806 Latitude; -78.08111 Longitude. Elevation: 57.9 metres above sea level and approximately 1.6 kilometres from the confluence of Muddy Creek with the James River. At Tamworth, Muddy Creek forms the boundary between Cumberland and Powhatan counties. A four-span concrete beam bridge with concrete side rails carries two lanes of traffic (SR 684) over Muddy Creek; the structure was erected in 1939. The bridge underwent extensive repairs in 2011, including substructure repair, and superstructure replacement. An elevation reference marker is located at the northwest corner of the junction of state routes 684 and 659 (Tamworth Road), stamped "113 CA 1957 195".

Tamworth is located in the Eastern Time Zone (EST/EDT) and along with the rest of Virginia observes daylight saving time.

== Weather ==
The average July high temperature is +30.9 °C, the average January low is -3.9 °C, and the average annual rainfall is 116.8 cm. Snowfall is 19.3 cm per year on average. Sunny days typically outnumber rainy days by almost 2 to 1 with a UV index of 4.6. Tamworth lies in USDA Plant Hardiness Zone 7a.

== Gallery ==
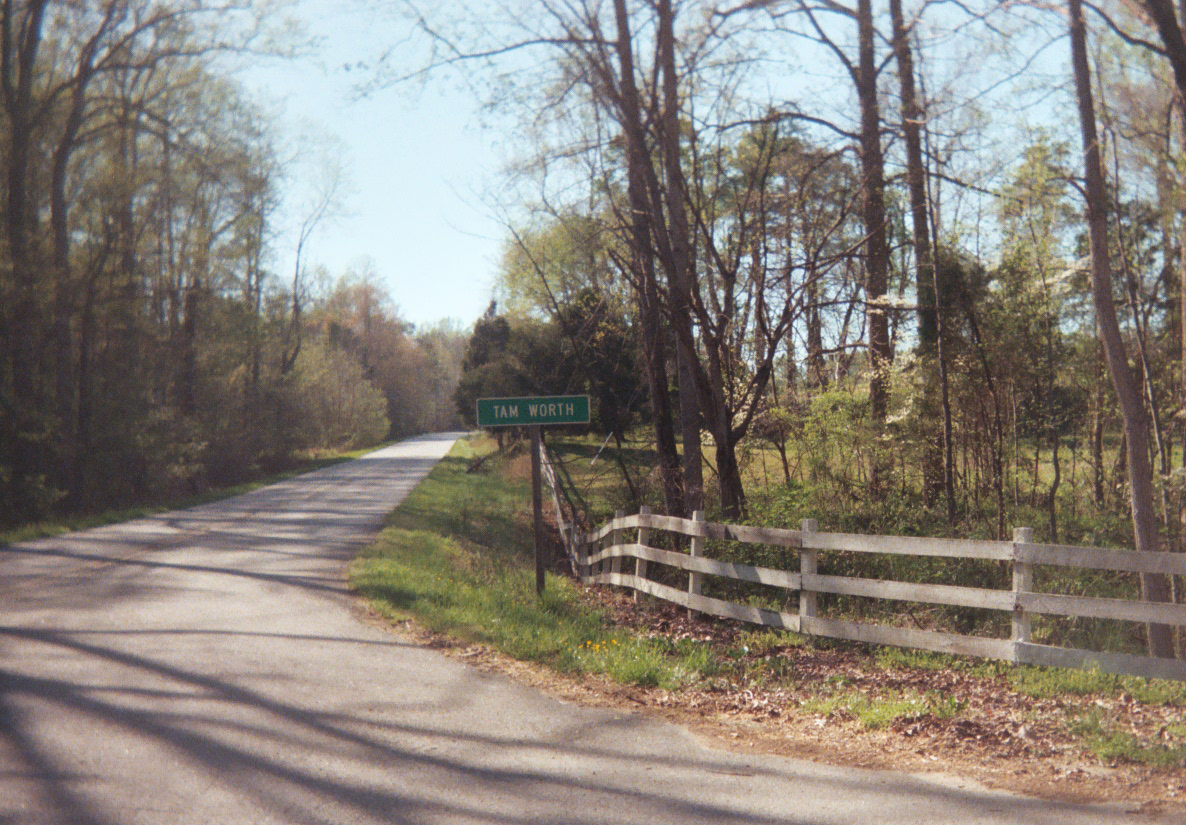
Tamworth highway sign

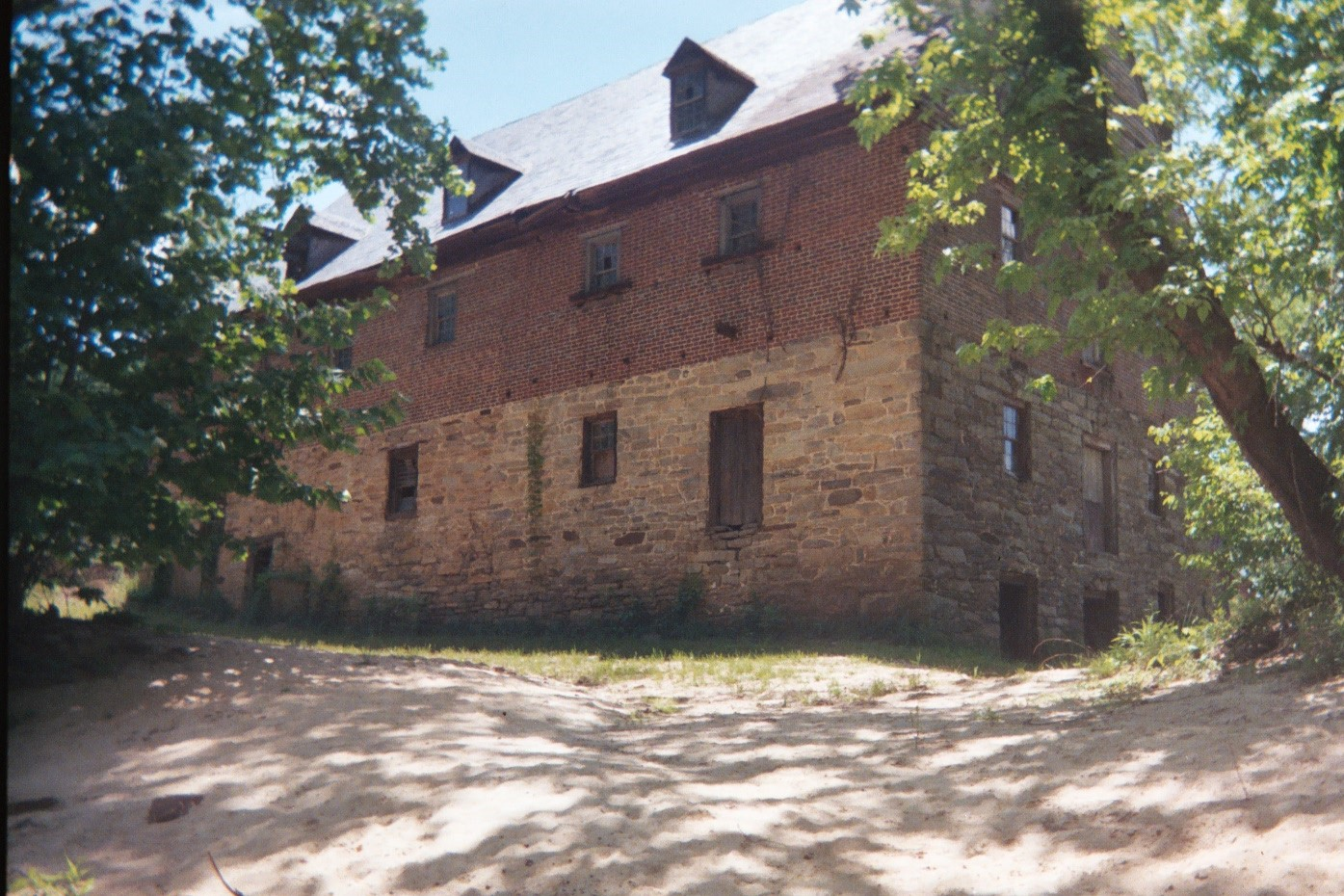
Muddy Creek Mill

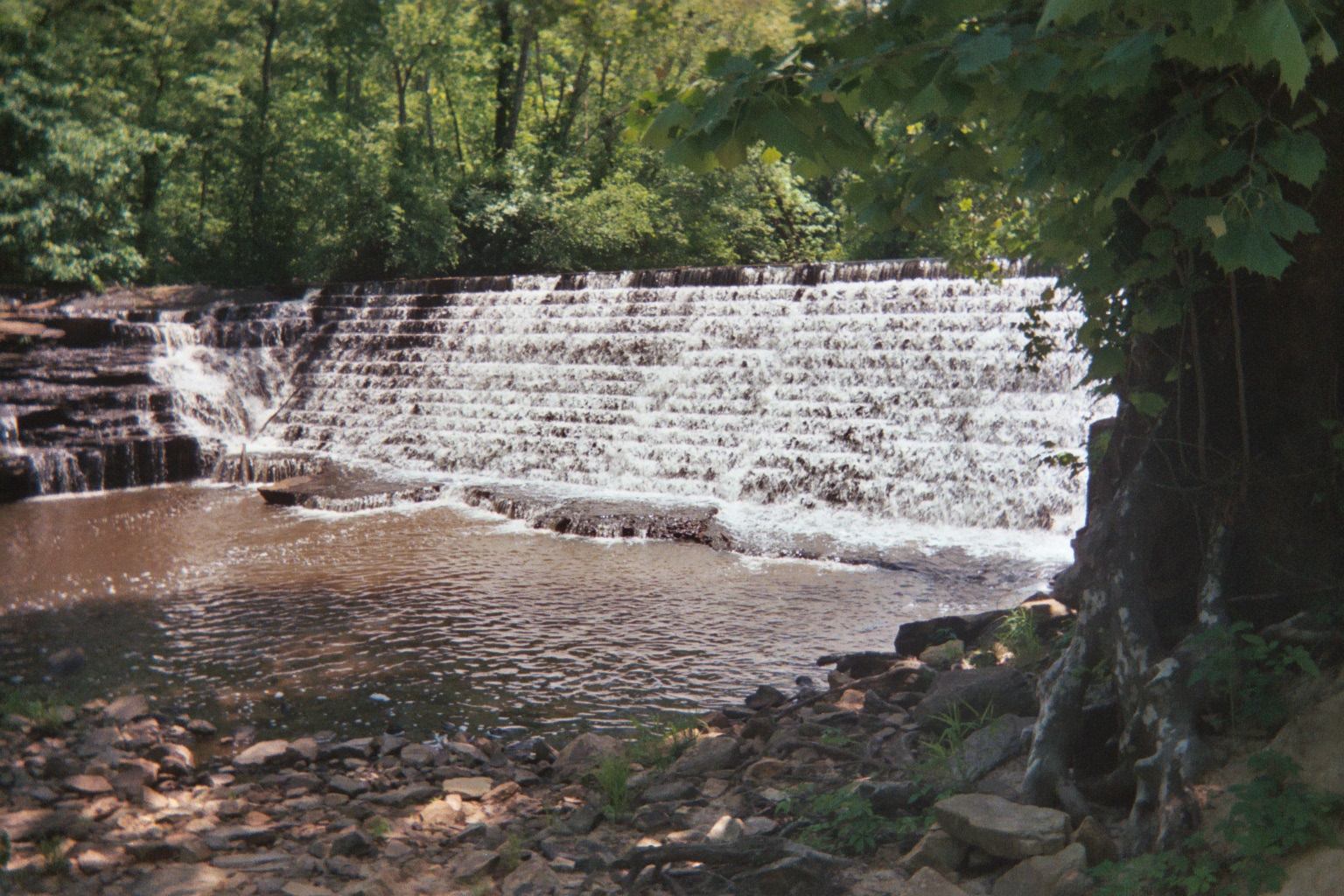
Muddy Creek Weir
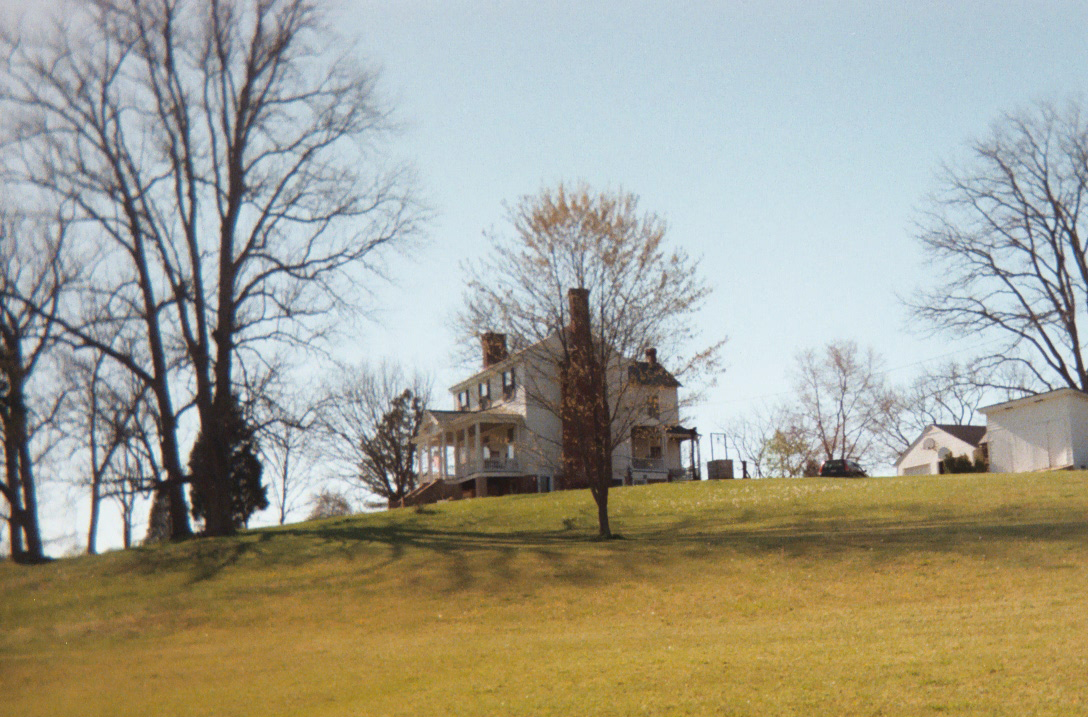
Farm House

Tamworth Cottage

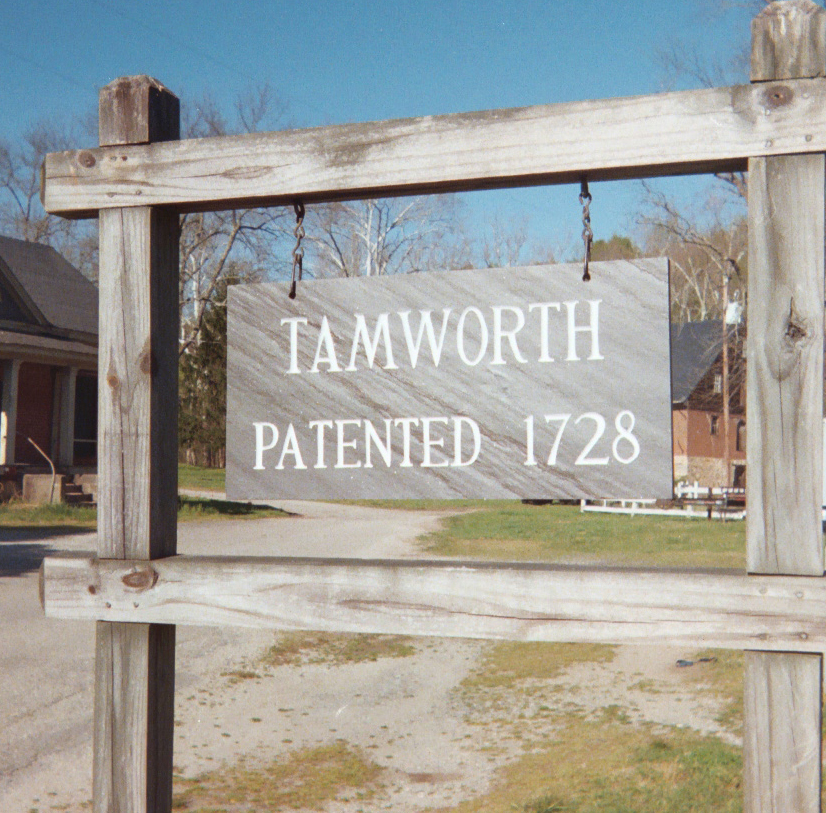
Tamworth 1723
