= James Devereux =

United States Marine Corps general and congressman

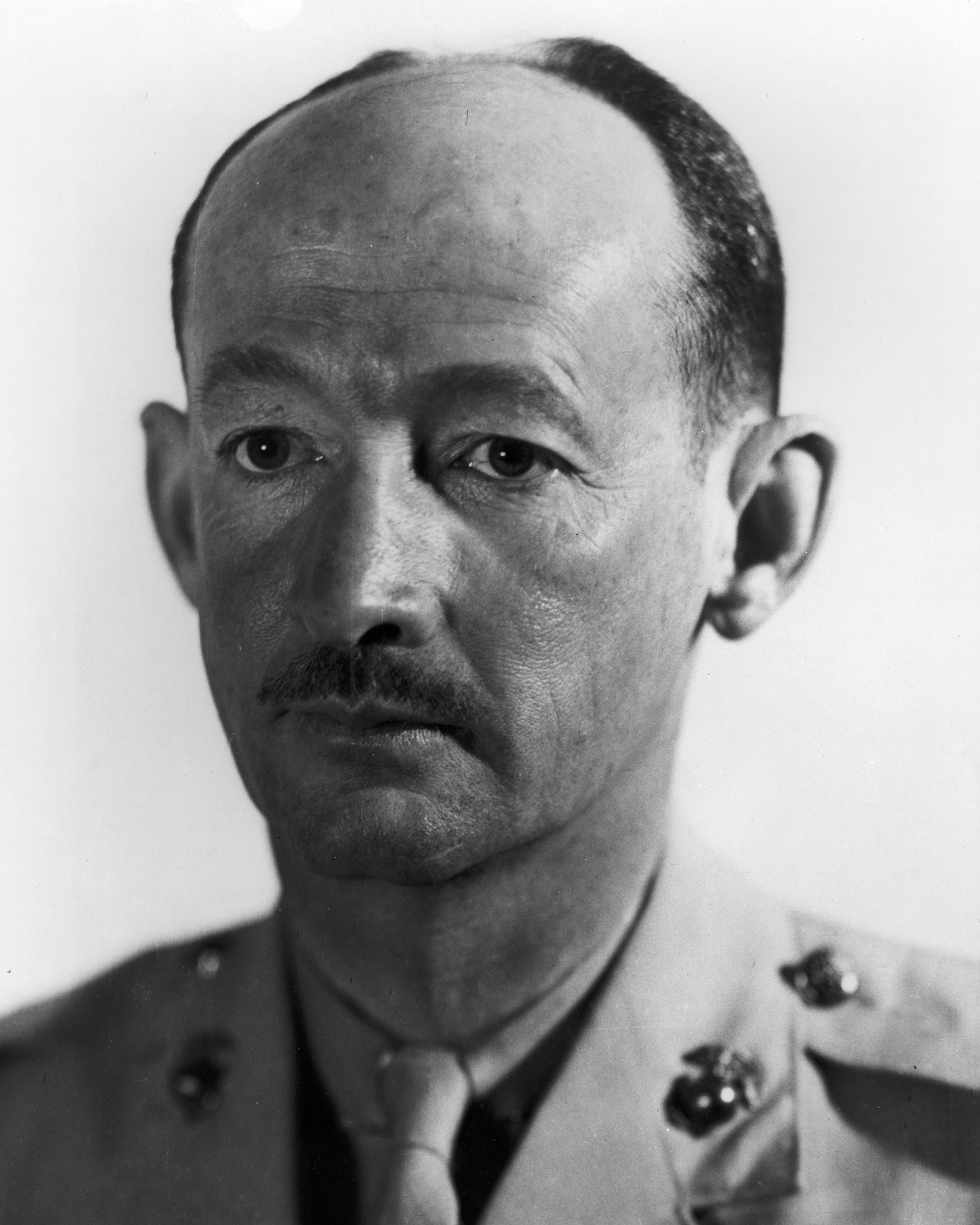

Member of the U.S. House of Representatives from Maryland's 2nd district
- In office January 3, 1951 – January 3, 1959
- Preceded by: William P. Bolton
- Succeeded by: Daniel Baugh Brewster

Personal details
- Born: James Patrick Sinnott Devereux; February 20, 1903 Cabana, Cuba
- Died: August 5, 1988 (aged 85) Towson, Maryland, U.S.
- Resting place: Arlington National Cemetery
- Party: Republican

Military service
- Allegiance: United States
- Branch/service: United States Marine Corps
- Years of service: 1923–1948
- Rank: Brigadier general
- Battles/wars: Banana Wars; World War II; Battle of Wake Island
- Awards: Navy Cross

James Patrick Sinnott Devereux (February 20, 1903 – August 5, 1988) was a United States Marine Corps general, Navy Cross recipient, and Republican congressman. He was the officer-in-charge (OIC) of the 1st Defense Battalion Detachment during the defense of Wake Island in December 1941. He was captured on Wake Island as a prisoner of war, along with his men, after a 15-day battle with the Japanese. After his release in September 1945, he concluded his military career as a colonel in 1948, where upon his retirement he was promoted to brigadier general. He later represented the second congressional district of the state of Maryland in the United States House of Representatives for four terms from 1951 to 1959. He was an unsuccessful candidate for election as Governor of Maryland in 1958.

== Biography ==
=== Early life ===
Devereux was born in Cabana, Cuba, where his father, Dr. John Ryan Devereaux, a U.S. Army surgeon, was stationed. In 1910, the family moved to Chevy Chase, Maryland, on the north border of the District of Columbia with Washington, D.C. There, Devereux, one of ten children, rode to hounds in Rock Creek Park and played polo. At age 10 he obtained a driver's license from the District of Columbia, which had no age requirement at the time.

Devereux also attended the Army and Navy Preparatory School in Washington, D.C., then the Tome School overlooking the Susquehanna River at Port Deposit, Maryland, LaVilla in Lausanne, Switzerland (when his parents lived in Vienna, Austria), and later Loyola College of Baltimore, a Jesuit Roman Catholic institution in Maryland.

=== Marine Corps career ===
Devereux enlisted in the United States Marine Corps in July 1923 at age 20, was commissioned a second lieutenant in February 1925, and then was assigned to duty in Norfolk, Virginia, Philadelphia, Pennsylvania, the Marine barracks at Quantico, Virginia, and at Guantanamo Bay, Cuba. In 1926, he was detailed to the mail guard detachment in New York City and later was transferred to the force of Marines then serving in Nicaragua as a company officer.

Returning to the United States early in 1927, he was assigned to the USS Utah and subsequently was sent ashore again to Nicaragua. Shortly thereafter he was ordered to China where he was promoted to first lieutenant. While in China he also commanded the Mounted Detachment of the U.S. Legation Guard at Beiping.

In 1933, following a year's tour of duty at Quantico, he was assigned to the Coast Artillery School at Fort Monroe, Virginia. Following his promotion to captain in December 1935, he was ordered back to Quantico, where, until 1936, he instructed in the Base Defense Weapons School and aided in the preparation of a Marine Corps manual on Base Defense Weapons.

In 1938, following a tour of duty with the Marine detachment on board the USS Utah, Devereux was transferred to the Marine Corps Base at San Diego.

==== Defense of Wake Island ====
In January 1941, Devereux was ordered to Pearl Harbor in the Hawaiian Islands and later dispatched to Wake Island as the officer-in-charge of the 1st Defense Battalion's Detachment on Wake Island, located in the northwest Pacific Ocean. Devereux and the men of the 1st Defense Battalion arrived at Wake Island on October 15, 1941 aboard the USS Regulus. When they arrived there were already 1,146 civilian construction workers on the island who were busy improving the atoll's infrastructure. On the morning of Monday, December 8, 1941, he received the message that Pearl Harbor had been attacked by the Japanese a few hours earlier (Sunday, December 7, 1941). In the fight that followed, the Battle of Wake Island, then-Major Devereux and his Marines, supported by Marine Fighter Squadron 211, damaged two cruisers, sank two destroyers, one escort vessel, and destroyed or damaged a total of 72 aircraft, and probably sank one submarine. Two more destroyers were damaged the last day. However, later, after a second more intensive larger invasion force attacked, after days of bitter fighting, the 449 Marines surrendered to the Japanese on December 23, 1941.

==== Prisoner of war ====
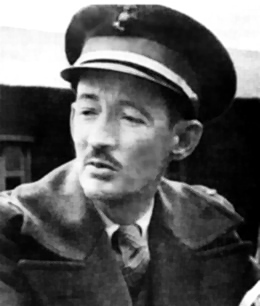
Maj Devereux, as POW in Shanghai, c. 1942.

After his capture, he remained on Wake Island until January 12, 1942, when he was sent away with his men on the Nita Maru. He stopped at Yokohama, where some American officers debarked, but later arrived at Wusong, located downriver from Shanghai, on January, 24. He remained there until December 9, 1942, when he was transferred to Jiangwan, where he spent 29 months imprisoned. For five weeks, he stayed at Fengtai, near Beiping, and then was transferred to camps in central Hokkaidō, Japan. Devereux was released from the Hokkaidō Island prison camp on September 15, 1945.

==== After World War II ====
After a brief rehabilitation leave, he was assigned as a student in the Senior Course at the Amphibious Warfare School at Quantico from September 1946 to May 1947. Upon completion of his studies, he received orders to the First Marine Division at Camp Pendleton, Oceanside, California. He served as the commanding officer of the Division's Headquarters Battalion until retiring on July 31, 1948. In 1947, his book, Story of Wake Island, was published.

Devereux was advanced to the rank of brigadier general upon retirement in accordance with law, having been specially commended for the performance of duty in actual combat. For his leadership in defending the tiny American outpost for 15 days against overwhelming odds, Devereux was awarded the Navy Cross. His citation reads:

The President of the United States of America takes pleasure in presenting the Navy Cross to Major James Patrick Sinnott Devereux, United States Marine Corps, for distinguished and heroic conduct in the line of his profession, as Commanding Officer of the First Marine Defense Battalion, Naval Air Station, Wake Island. Major Devereux was responsible for directing defenses of that post during the Japanese siege from 7 through December 22, 1941, against impossible odds. Major Devereux's inspiring leadership and the valiant devotion to duty of his command contributed in large measure to the outstanding success of these vital missions and reflect great credit upon the United States Naval Service.

==== Awards and decorations ====
BGen Devereux's awards include:

Navy Cross	Navy Presidential Unit Citation	Prisoner of War Medal
Marine Corps Expeditionary Medal w/ "WAKE ISLAND" clasp	Nicaraguan Campaign Medal (1933)	Yangtze Service Medal
American Defense Service Medal w/ "BASE" clasp	Asiatic-Pacific Campaign Medal with one battle star	World War II Victory Medal

Devereux became eligible for the Prisoner of War Service Medal when it was authorized on November 8, 1985.

=== Post-military career – farming, Congress, public safety ===
Devereux took up horse farming, with a farm near Glyndon, Maryland, in suburban Baltimore County; and following his retirement from the Marine Corps, Devereux moved to a 200-acre (0.81 km^{2}) farm at Stevenson, Maryland.

In 1950, Devereux was elected as a Republican to the U.S. Congress for Maryland's 2nd Congressional District by defeating incumbent Democratic Rep. William P. Bolton. Devereux would serve four terms in the U.S. House of Representatives from January 3, 1951, to January 3, 1959. During his Congressional career, he supported public school desegregation and ending racial discrimination in employment. He served on the House Armed Services Committee from July 3, 1952 (replacing John Anderson (R-Calif.)) until he left Congress. Devereaux did not sign the 1956 Southern Manifesto and voted in favor of the Civil Rights Act of 1957. He was not a candidate for renomination in 1958, but was an unsuccessful candidate for election as Governor of Maryland against Democrat J. Millard Tawes from Crisfield on Maryland's lower Eastern Shore of the Chesapeake Bay. In 1960, he was named Republican Party chairman in his congressional district.

He later served as director of public safety for Baltimore County, Maryland, from December 1962 to 1966, supervising the police and fire departments.

He was a member of the Sons of the American Revolution.

He was a resident of Ruxton, Maryland, until his death.

=== Family ===
Devereux is the grandson of Joseph F. Sinnott, a prominent Irish businessman in Philadelphia who made a fortune as a co-owner of Gibson's Rye Whisky. Devereux's mother, Annie Sinnott Devereux, died on October 27, 1944, while he was interred in a Japanese Prison Camp. While stationed in Peiping, China, Devereux met Mary Brush Welch, the daughter of Colonel John P. Welch, a U.S. Army officer. They were married in 1932. They had one son, James Patrick, and one daughter who died at birth (1934). Mrs. Devereux died of complications from diabetes in 1942, shortly after his capture by the Japanese on Wake Island. She was buried in Arlington National Cemetery. In 1946, he married Rachel Clarke Cooke and they had two sons. The second Mrs. Devereux died in 1977. He married a third time, to Edna Burnside Howard, in 1978, gaining a stepson and three stepdaughters. His sister, Margaret, married Brigadier General Richard H. Jeschke, USMC.

=== Death and burial ===
Brigadier General Devereux died at age 85 in Stella Maris Hospice in the county seat of Towson, Maryland, just north of Baltimore on August 5, 1988, from pneumonia. He is interred in Arlington National Cemetery in northern Virginia overlooking the Potomac River.

=== Electoral history ===
1950 Maryland 2nd Congressional District General Election
Party	Candidate	Votes	%
Republican	James Devereux	99,497	50.2
Democratic	William Bolton (Incumbent)	96,498	48.7
Progressive	Thelma Gerende	2,129	1.1

1952 Maryland 2nd Congressional District General Election
Party	Candidate	Votes	%
Republican	James Devereux (Incumbent)	95,811	50.2
Democratic	A. Gordon Boone	60,121	38.6

1954 Maryland 2nd Congressional District General Election
Party	Candidate	Votes	%
Republican	James Devereux (Incumbent)	67,179	56.1
Democratic	William Bolton	52,540	43.9

1956 Maryland 2nd Congressional District General Election
Party	Candidate	Votes	%
Republican	James Devereux (Incumbent)	103,103	58.1
Democratic	A. Gordon Boone	74,224	41.9

1958 Maryland Gubernatorial General Election
Party	Candidate	Votes	%
Democratic	J. Millard Tawes	485,061	63.6
Republican	James Devereux	278,173	36.5

== Notes ==
U.S. House of Representatives
Preceded by William P. Bolton	U.S. Congressman, Maryland 2nd District; 1951—1959	Succeeded by Daniel B. Brewster
Party political offices
Preceded by Theodore McKeldin	Republican nominee for Governor of Maryland; 1958	Succeeded by Frank Small, Jr.
