= 12th Littoral Anti-Air Battalion =

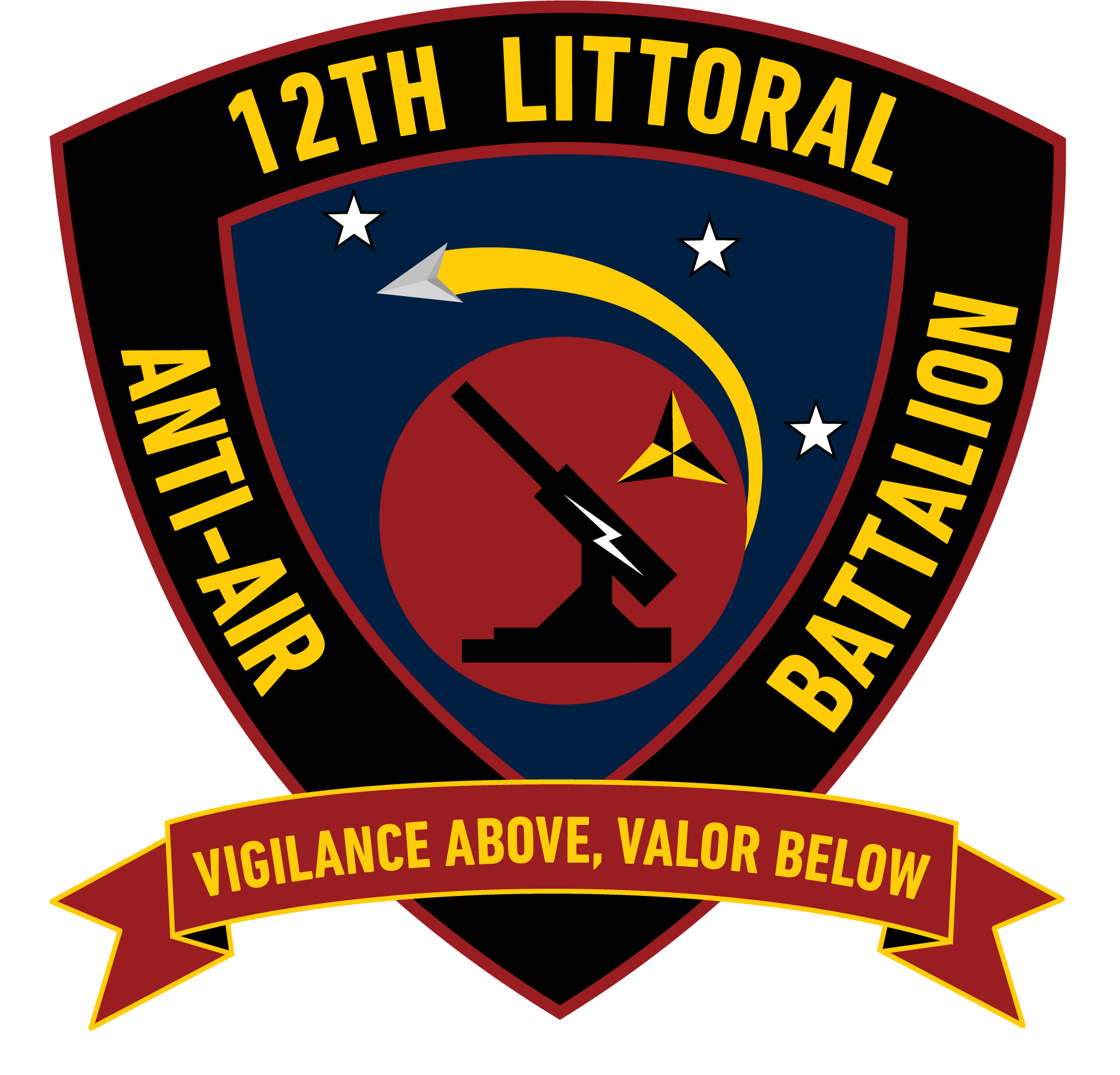
- 12th LAAB Insignia
- Active: 20 July 1937 – 15 November 1944; 12 January 1953 – 30 November 1970; 11 March 1987 – 28 September 1990; 1 September 1994 – 11 July 1997; 1 October 2024 – Present
- Country: United States of America
- Branch: United States Marine Corps
- Type: Air Defense / Air Control
- Part of: 12th Marine Littoral Regiment; 3rd Marine Division
- Nickname: "The Defenders of Wake"
- Mottos: "Vigilance Above, Valor Below"
- Colors: Black, Yellow, Red, Blue, White, Grey
- Anniversaries: Original Activation 20 July 1937; 12th LAAB Activation 1 October 2024
- Engagements: World War II: Battle of Wake Island; Vietnam War

Commanders
- Current commander: LtCol Scott W. Caton
- Notable commanders: Bertram A. Bone

12th Marine Littoral Anti-Air Battalion (12th LAAB) is a United States Marine Corps aviation command and control and air defense unit that is optimized for operations in the first island chain. The battalion is based at Camp Hansen in Okinawa, Japan and falls under the command of the 12th Marine Littoral Regiment and the 3rd Marine Division.

The battalion is the lineal descendant of the 1st Defense Battalion which gained fame during World War II for its defense of Wake Island early in the war. The battalion was later commissioned as the 1st Light Antiaircraft Missile Battalion (1st LAAM) equipped with the medium range surface-to-air MIM-23 HAWK Missile System. 1st LAAM deployed to Vietnam in 1965 providing air defense for the Marine Corps in the I Corps sector. 1st LAAM was last based at Marine Corps Air Station Yuma, Arizona and fell under the command of Marine Air Control Group 38 (MACG-38) and the 3rd Marine Aircraft Wing (3rd MAW) before being decommissioned in 1997.

The Commandant of the Marine Corps's Force Design 2030 initiative set out a vision for the Corps, which included making it capable of operating inside of the range of China's weapon systems. One of the requirements borne out of this realignment was the need for mobile, air defense and air control units that utilize their sensors and antiaircraft weapons to increase survivability of Marine Corps forces in the first island chain and South China Sea. The 12th Littoral Anti-Air Battalion was reactivated on October 1, 2024 with a ceremony on December 5, 2024 on Camp Hansen, Okinawa, Japan.

== History ==
=== Early years ===
The 2d Antiaircraft Battalion was activated at Marine Corps Base Quantico, Virginia on 20 July 1937. The battalion was relocated to Marine Corps Base Parris Island, South Carolina in December 1937 and again relocated to San Diego, California in May 1938. The battalion was re-designated as the 2d Battalion, 15th Marines on 15 November 1938 and again as the 1st Defense Battalion on 1 November 1939 under Lieutenant colonel Bertram A. Bone.

=== World War II ===
The 1st Defense Battalion departed San Diego on board the USS William P. Biddle (APA-8) and USS Enterprise (CV-6) arriving at Pearl Harbor, Hawaii in mid-February 1941. On 10 March 1941 a portion of the battalion, designated Detachment A, arrived at Palmyra Island, where they immediately began construction of barracks and gun emplacements. In July 1941 the battalion sent another detachment from Pearl Harbor, this time to Johnston Island. The Marine detachment, 1st Defense Battalion, Wake Island, was organized on 8 August 1941 at Honolulu, Hawaii, on board the SS Regulus. The detachment arrived at Wake Island on 19 August 1941.

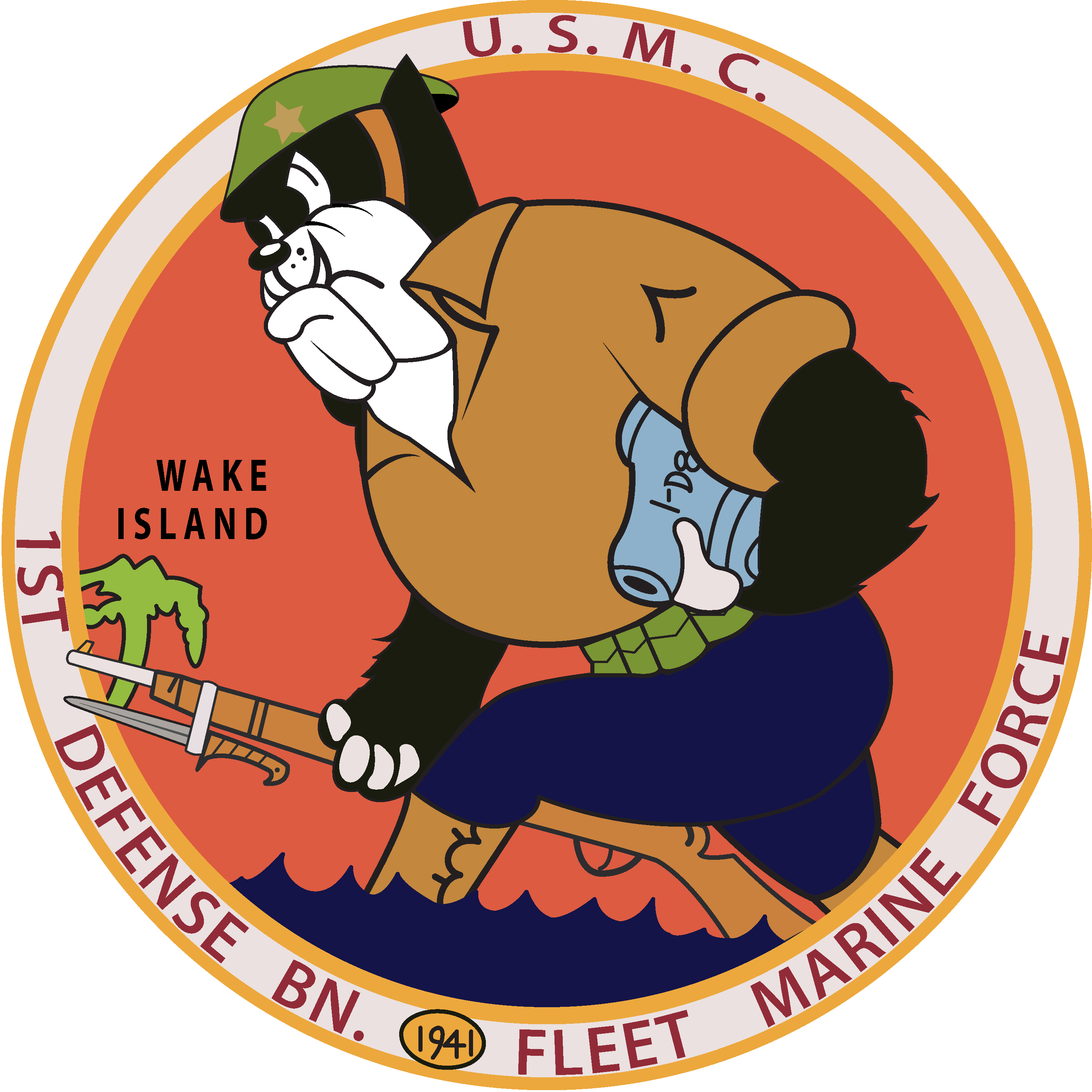
Old insignia for the 1st Defense Battalion used during World War II

==== Pearl, Johnston and Palmyra ====
7 December 1941 found the battalion defending four points: Pearl Harbor, Wake Island, Johnston Island and Palmyra Island. The units at Pearl Harbor took part in the defense of the Marine Barracks at the Navy Yard. Following news of the attack on Pearl Harbor, the civilian contractors already present on Johnston began to building more emplacements for the Marines' guns and positions.

The first attacks against Johnston Island occurred on 12 December 1941. A Japanese submarine, 8,000 yards offshore, broke the surface and fired star shells clusters over Johnston. The Marine 5-inch guns tried to find the enemy submarine with its own star shell clusters, scaring the submarine off.

Another attack came on the night of 15th. The US Navy supply ship, USS William Ward Burrows (AP-6), had arrived at dusk to drop off supplies meant for the Marines stranded on Wake, and to retrieve some civilian contractors to return to Pearl Harbor. The Navy ship and the Marines on Johnston spotted a flash at sea. The first enemy shells hit Johnston and its powerhouse, setting off a large fire that engulfed the building. The Marines returned fire for ten minutes until the submarine ceased firing.

The final attacks came on the nights of 21 and 22 December. The 21 December shelling was almost a repeat of the attack on 12 December. The final attack came on the 22nd. A Japanese submarine fired a star shell cluster and six shells at Johnston knocking down a homing tower and wounding a Marine. Fire from Marines coastal batteries forced the submarine to submerge.

The sole attack on Palmyra (located 900 miles southeast of Johnston) came near dawn on 24 December 1941. A Japanese submarine fired on Palmyra and the USS Sacramento (PG-19), which sat in the atoll's lagoon. The Japanese shells did minor damage to the ship before it was driven back under by Marine 5-inch coastal guns.

==== Defense of Wake Island ====
In January 1941, the United States Navy constructed a military base on Wake Island. On 19 August, the first permanent military garrison, understrength elements of the 1st Marine Defense Battalion, totaling 450 officers and men, were stationed on the island, under Major James P.S. Devereux. The defense battalion was supplemented by Marine Corps fighter squadron VMF-211, consisting of 12 F4F-3 Wildcat fighters, commanded by Major Paul A. Putnam. Also present on the island were 68 U.S. Navy personnel and about 1,221 civilian workers for the Morrison-Knudsen Civil Engineering Company. Forty-five Chamorro men were employed by Pan American Airways at the company's facilities in Wake Island, one of the stops on the Pan Am Clipper trans-Pacific air service initiated in 1935.

Early on the morning of 11 December, the garrison, with the support of the four remaining Wildcats, repelled the first Japanese landing attempt by the South Seas Force, which included the light cruisers Yubari, Tenryū, and Tatsuta; the destroyers Yayoi, Mutsuki, Kisaragi, Mochizuki, Hayate, and Oite; Patrol Boat No. 32 and Patrol Boat No. 33 (two Momi-class destroyers converted to patrol boats), and two troop transport ships containing 450 Special Naval Landing Force troops.

The U.S. Marines fired at the invasion fleet with their six 5-inch (127 mm) coast-defense guns. Major Devereux ordered the gunners to hold their fire until the enemy moved within range of the coastal defenses. "Battery L", on Peale islet, succeeded in sinking Hayate at a distance of 4,000 yd (3,700 m) with at least two direct hits to her magazines, causing her to explode and sink within two minutes, in full view of the defenders on shore. Yubari's superstructure was hit 11 times. The four Wildcats also succeeded in sinking the destroyer Kisaragi by dropping a bomb on her stern where the depth charges were stored. Both Japanese destroyers were lost with nearly all hands (there was only one survivor, from Hayate), with Hayate becoming the first Japanese surface warship to be sunk in the war. The Japanese force withdrew without landing. This was the first Japanese setback of the war against the Americans. After the initial raid was fought off the siege continued and frequent Japanese air attacks on the Wake garrison continued, without resupply for the Americans.

The second Japanese invasion force came on 23 December, composed mostly of the ships from the first attempt with the major reinforcements of the carriers Hiryū and Sōryū, plus 1,500 Japanese marines. The landings began at 02:35; after a preliminary bombardment, PB 32 and PB 33 were beached and burnt in their attempts to land the invasion force. After a full night and morning of fighting, the Wake garrison surrendered to the Japanese by mid-afternoon.

The U.S. Marines lost 49 killed and two MIA during the entire 15-day siege, while three U.S. Navy personnel and at least 70 U.S. civilians were killed, including 10 Chamorros, and 12 civilians wounded. Japanese losses were recorded at around 820 killed, with around 333 more wounded, in addition to the two destroyers that were lost in the first invasion attempt with nearly all hands (168 from Hayate and 157 from Kisaragi, 325 in total for the two Mutsuki-class destroyers) on the first assault. At least 28 land-based and carrier aircraft were also either shot down or damaged. The Japanese captured all men remaining on the island, the majority of whom were civilian contractors. A special military decoration, the Wake Island Device, affixed to either the Navy Expeditionary Medal or the Marine Corps Expeditionary Medal, was created to honor those who had fought in the defense of the island.

==== Reorganization, garrison duty and deactivation ====
In February 1942 the 1st Defense Battalion Marines at Pearl Harbor set sail for Palmyra Island. On 1 March 1942 the battalion was reorganized with the detachments at Johnston and Palmyra being disbanded. The 1st Defense Battalion remained at Palmyra Island until 13 October 1943 when it was relieved by US Army garrison forces. Shortly thereafter the battalion set sail for Pearl Harbor. It remained there until January 1944 when it sailed again, this time for Majuro Atoll in the Marshall Islands. On 26 February the battalion assumed patrolling duty for the islands beaches.

On 7 May 1944 the 1st Defense Battalion was re-designated as the 1st Antiaircraft Battalion. A month and a half later it was again re-designated, this time to the 1st Antiaircraft Artillery Battalion. On 24 October 1944 the battalion was relieved of all of its duties and on 15 November 1944 the 1st Antiaircraft Artillery Battalion was decommissioned.

=== Reactivation and transition to the HAWK Missile ===
On 12 January 1953 the battalion was reactivated this time as the 1st 75mm Antiaircraft Artillery Battery at Marine Corps Base Camp Lejeune, North Carolina. The battery was initially tasked with testing and evaluating the newly acquired M51 Skysweeper. The battery relocated to Marine Corps Training Center 29 Palms, California arriving on 20 October 1953. For the remainder of the 1950s 1st 75mm AA Battery acted as the host unit for thousands of Marine Reservists training at the base during the summer. They also participated in numerous training exercises throughout the southwestern United States to include Fort Irwin. The battery was redesignated as 1st 75mm Antiaircraft Artillery Battalion 1 April 1959.

On 21 April 1960 Captain Milton Kramer fired the last 75mm M51 Skysweeper rounds in the Marine Corps while serving with the 1st 75mm AA Battalion at Twentynine Palms. The Skysweeper was officially retired from Marine Corps service as the 500-man battalion prepared to transition to the HAWK Missile System. On 2 May 1960, at a twilight parade at Marine Corps Base 29 Palms, CA the 1st Light Antiaircraft Missile Battalion was officially activated by the Brigadier General Alpha L. Bowser. Of note, the Sergeant Major at this time was SgtMaj Robert Winslow. This was SgtMaj Winslow's second stint with the unit as he had been a member of the 1st Defense Battalion at Wake Island at the beginning of World War II. He spent the remainder of the war as a prisoner of war of the Japanese. The new HAWK battalions were completely helicopter transportable and consisted of 24 HAWK launchers organized into a headquarters and service battery and four firing batteries.

=== Vietnam War and cutbacks ===
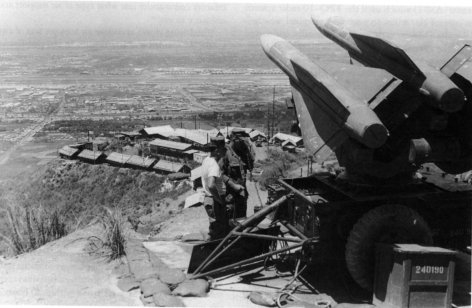

On 15 November 1964, 1st LAAM Battalion began conducting a routine operational and readiness test exercise dubbed "Operation Anthill" at MCB 29 Palms, CA. Events quickly escalated and three days later the 600-man battalion was tasked to move out heading for an undisclosed location in the Western Pacific. 1st LAAM Battalion departed California in November 1964 and arrived in Vietnam in February 1965 as one of the first American units to land in Vietnam. They were tasked with providing air defense for the area surrounding the massive Da Nang Air Base complex. 1st LAAM firing batteries were based on the airfield and on Hill 327 which was a few miles west of the airfield. No enemy air attacks were ever attempted against the Danang Airbase however the battalion did participate in numerous civic action programs and conducted numerous practice HAWK Missile engagements while in country. On 1 July 1969, the battalion received a warning order from higher headquarters that they would be departing Vietnam in short order. Their departure was part of President Nixon's planned reduction of American forces in Vietnam. On 19 July, after four and a half years in country, 1st LAAM ceased all air defense activities in Vietnam and began to prepare for embarkation. On 11 August 1969 Alpha and Charlie batteries boarded the USS Belle Grove and the USS Tortuga at Danang and departed Vietnam. Three days later, Bravo and H&S Batteries boarded the USS Tulare and departed. After brief stops in Okinawa and Yokosuka the ships set sail for California. After LAAM's departure, air defense for the Danang area was provided by fighters located at the airbase.

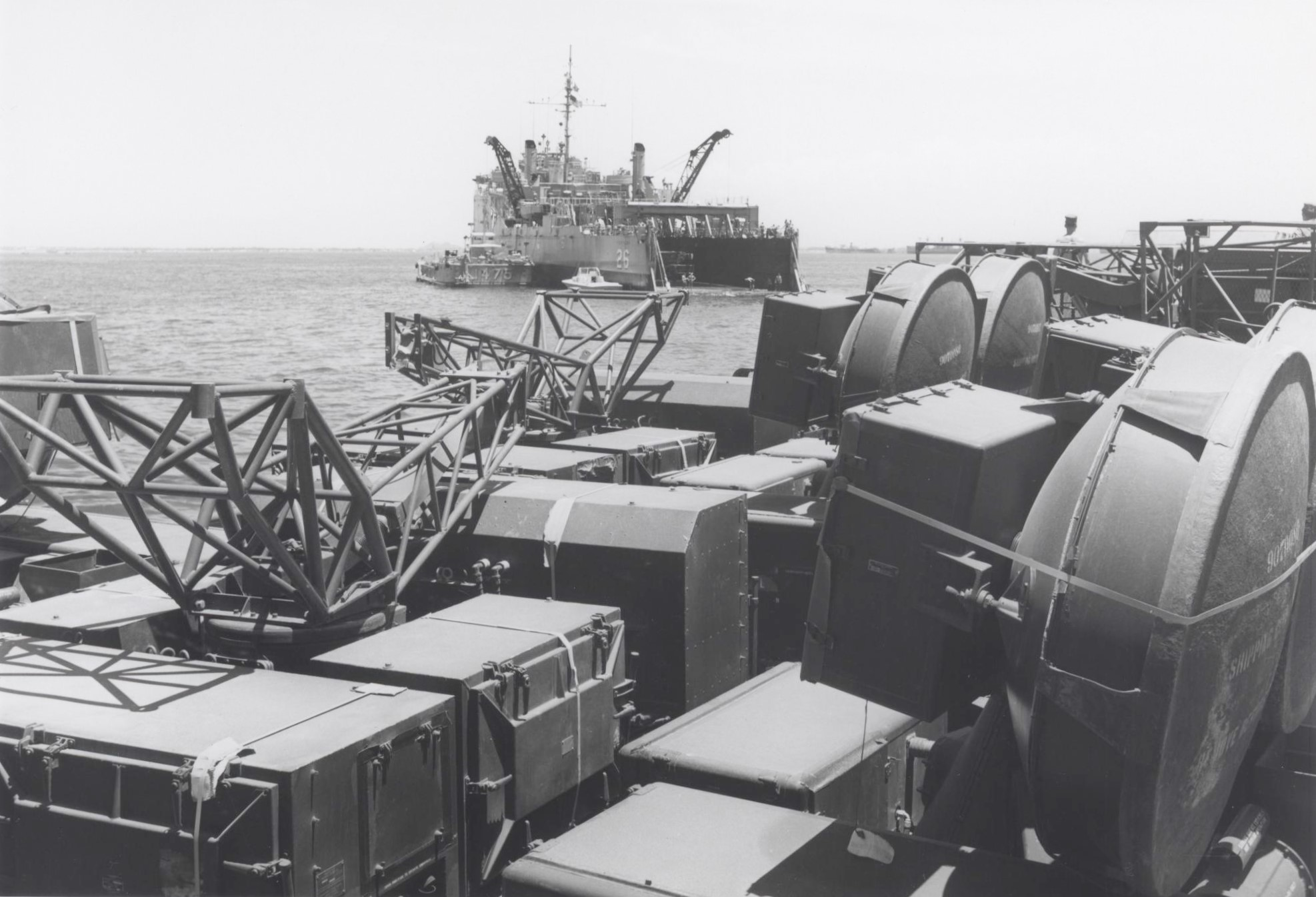
Equipment of the 1st LAAM Battalion on board a ship in Da Nang Harbor

The battalion began to arrive back in California in September 1969. Upon their return to Marine Corps Base 29 Palms, CA, 1st LAAM fell under the command of Marine Air Control Group 38 and the 3rd Marine Aircraft Wing. 1st LAAM Battalion was deactivated on 30 November 1970 as part of a post-Vietnam War cutback in the Marine Corps' end strength.

=== Reactivation, broken time and final stand down ===
1st LAAM was reactivated on 11 March 1987 at Camp Hansen, Okinawa, Japan as part of Marine Air Control Group 18 (MACG-18), 1st Marine Aircraft Wing(1st MAW). The battalion was reactivated as part of a Marine Corps initiative titled the "Air Defense Enhancement Program" which sought to provide an Improved HAWK Missile capability in support of the III Marine Amphibious Force in the Pacific Area of Operations. 1st LAAM Battalion was composed of a battalion headquarters and a Headquarters & Services battery. The two firing batteries, Alpha and Bravo, were provided by Marines from 2d and 3d LAAM Battalions as part of the Unit Deployment Program. In July 1990 1st LAAM Battalion was directed by Headquarters Marine Corps to decommission in 4th Quarter 1990. At 1600 on 28 September 1990, then commanding officer, LtCol Frank D. Dunn transferred 1st LAAM's colors to MajGen Ehlert, Commanding General 1st MAW.

On 1 September 1994, 1st LAAM Battalion was reactivated at Marine Corps Air Station Yuma, Arizona. This event coincided with the decommissioning of 2d LAAM Battalion whose personnel and equipment were re-designated as 1st LAAM Battalion. During this time the battalion was the only active duty unit providing medium range air defense in the Marine Corps. For the next three years the battalion continued to support exercises throughout the southwestern United States to include Exercises Red Flag, Roving Sands and the Marine Corps' Combined Arms Exercises (CAX) and Weapons Tactics Instructor Course (WTI). 1st LAAM Battalion was decommissioned on 11 July 1997 as the Marine Corps began to divest itself of its medium range air defense capability. Following the decommissioning, a battery of HAWK missiles was maintained at MCAS Yuma under the command of Marine Air Control Squadron 1 (MACS-1).

=== Reactivation as a Littoral Anti-Air Battalion ===
The 12th Littoral Anti-Air Battalion was reactivated on October 1, 2024, and held its activation ceremony on December 5, 2024, at Camp Hansen, Okinawa, Japan. This new battalion is tasked with providing air defense, air surveillance and early warning and air control

== Notable former members ==
- James Devereux
- Allan P. Bakke

== Unit awards ==
A unit citation or commendation is an award bestowed upon an organization for the action cited. Members of the unit who participated in said actions are allowed to wear on their uniforms the awarded unit citation. The 1st Light Antiaircraft Missile Battalion has been presented with the following awards:

Streamer	Award	Year(s)	Additional Info
	Presidential Unit Citation Streamer with Bronze Star	1941, 1965–67	Wake Island, Vietnam
	Meritorious Unit Commendation Streamer	85–87	
	American Defense Service Streamer with one Bronze Star		
	Marine Corps Expeditionary Streamer with silver "W"		
	Asiatic-Pacific Campaign Streamer with three Bronze Stars		
	National Defense Service Streamer with two Bronze Stars	1950–1954, 1961–1974, 1990–1995	Korean War, Vietnam War, Gulf War
	Vietnam Service Streamer with two Silver and one Bronze Star		
	Vietnam Gallantry Cross with Palm Streamer		

== Gallery ==
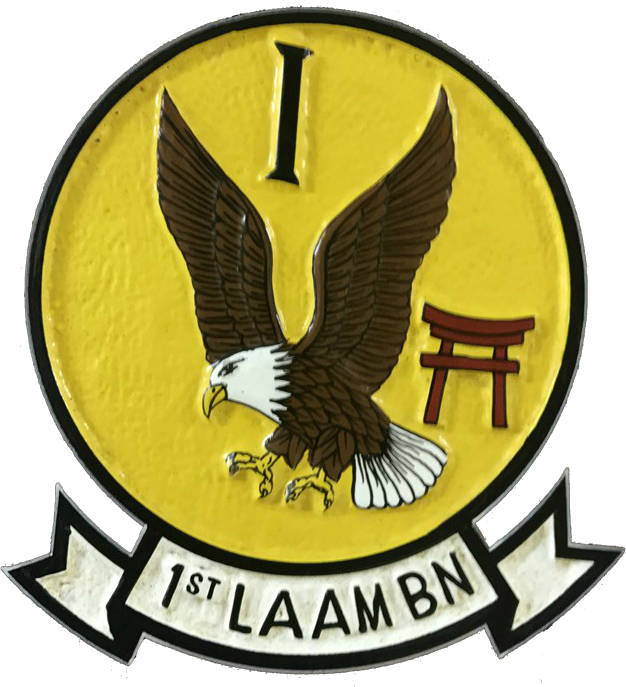
1st LAAM Battalion insignia utilized in the 1980s

== See also ==
- United States Marine Corps Aviation
- List of United States Marine Corps aviation support units
- History of ground based air defense in the United States Marine Corps
