= Edward H. Forney =

U.S. Marine Corps Brigadier General

Edward Hanna Forney
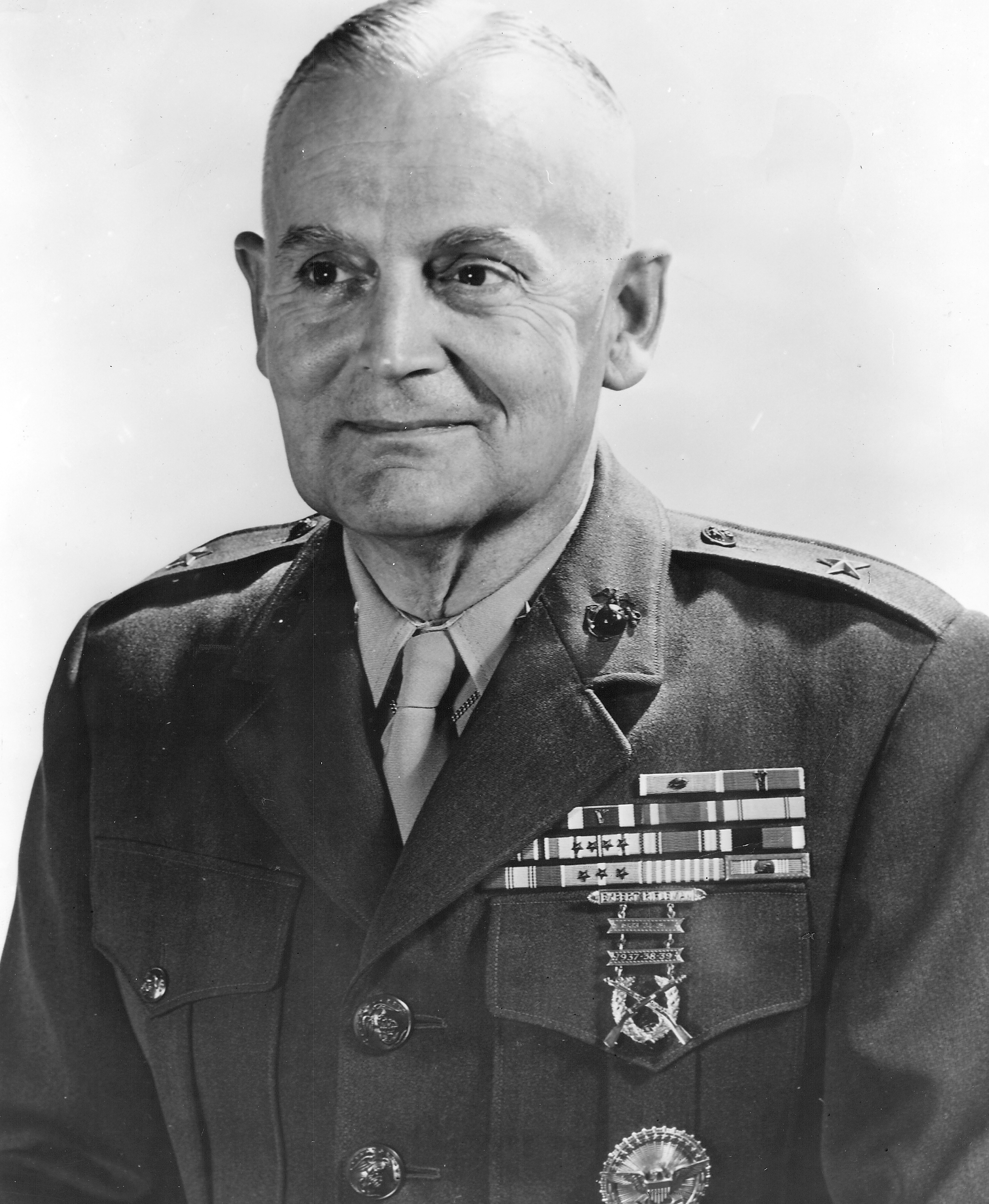
- Forney as Brigadier general, USMC
- Born: August 16, 1909; Denver, Colorado, US
- Died: January 21, 1965 (aged 55); San Francisco, California, US
- Burial place: Arlington National Cemetery
- Military career
- Allegiance: United States
- Branch: United States Marine Corps
- Service years: 1931–1959
- Rank: Brigadier general
- Service number: 0-4652
- Commands: 3rd Defense Battalion
- Conflicts: World War II: New Georgia Campaign; Bougainville Campaign; Battle of Okinawa; Korean War: Battle of P'ohang-dong; Battle of Inchon; Second Battle of Seoul; Battle of Chosin Reservoir; Blockade of Wonsan
- Awards: Legion of Merit (2); Bronze Star Medal; Commendation Medal (2); Air Medal

Edward Hanna Forney (August 16, 1909 – January 21, 1965) was a highly decorated officer of the United States Marine Corps with the rank of brigadier general. He is most noted for his part during the Hungnam evacuation during the Korean War, the largest U.S. amphibious evacuation of civilians, under combat conditions, in American history.

== Early years ==
Forney was born on August 16, 1909, in Denver, Colorado, as the son of engineer Edward Francis Hanna Forney and his wife Pauline Lancaster Peyton. His family moved many times due to father's job and young Edward spent childhood in Havana, Cuba, Hollywood, California, New York City and finally in Washington, D.C. He also attended St. John's College High School there in 1927 and was admitted to the United States Naval Academy at Annapolis, Maryland. During his time at the academy, Forney was active in the football, cross country running or water polo and graduated on June 4, 1931, with bachelor's degree. He was commissioned a second lieutenant in the Marine Corps on the same date.

Upon his graduation, Forney was ordered to the Basic School at Philadelphia Navy Yard for further officer training and graduated one year later. He then served with 1st Marine Brigade in Haiti for brief period, before he was attached to the Marine detachment aboard the battleship USS Arkansas. Forney spent 30 months with that vessel and took part in the cruise to Plymouth, England, Nice, France, Naples, Italy, and Gibraltar.

He then served a brief stint at Marine Barracks, Parris Island, South Carolina, and Quantico, Virginia and subsequently completed the regular course at Army Field Artillery School at Fort Sill, Oklahoma in June 1939. Forney was then ordered to the Marine Corps Base San Diego and attached to the 2nd Battalion, 10th Marine Artillery Regiment and served under Lieutenant Colonel John B. Wilson as commander of Battery E.

Forney was then transferred to the newly activated 1st Defense Battalion under Lieutenant Colonel Bertram A. Bone. This new type of marine units consisted of the batteries with 5"/51 caliber guns, searchlight and aircraft sound locator and antiaircraft groups with M2 Browning and M1917 Browning machine guns and was ideal for the defense of the U.S. naval bases in South Pacific from the attack from the sea and air.

== World War II ==
Forney was transferred to the staff of Amphibious Corps, Pacific Fleet under Major General Clayton B. Vogel in October 1941 and sailed as major for Pacific theater one year later. He was stationed in Noumea, New Caledonia and following the redesignation to I Marine Amphibious Corps he was attached as liaison officer and observer to 9th Defense Battalion under the command of Lieutenant Colonel William J. Scheyer in summer 1943.

He took part in the capture and subsequent occupation of Rendova Island during New Georgia Campaign at the beginning of July 1943 and received the Bronze Star Medal with Combat "V" and Navy Unit Commendation for his service there. Forney, who just distinguished himself in last campaign, was ordered to New Zealand in order to relieve his Naval Academy classmate, lieutenant colonel Samuel G. Taxis as commanding officer of 3rd Defense Battalion on August 26, 1943. He was promoted to the rank of lieutenant colonel for his new assignment.

Following a brief stay there, 3rd Defense Battalion was ordered to Guadalcanal in September 1943 and then took part in Bougainville Campaign in November of that year. He landed on Bougainville right behind the first waves of assault troop and commanded his battalion during the occupation and defense of Cape Torokina. His unit provided support to ground troops ashore until December 1943 and Forney received Navy Commendation Medal with Combat "V" for his service at Cape Torokina, Bougainville.

Forney then took part in consolidation of Northern Solomons and following the redesignation of his unit to 3d Antiaircraft Artillery Battalion in June 1944, he led his unit back to Guadalcanal. One of Forney's last assignment on Guadalcanal was construction of camp near the village of Tetere and he was subsequently transferred to 10th Marine Regiment, 2nd Marine Division. He served as Regimental executive officer under his old superior, Colonel Bertram A. Bone and participated in the amphibious exercise on Saipan in order to prepare 10th Marines for upcoming Okinawa campaign. However 10th Marines served as floating reserve force, and Forney did not see combat.

== Later service and Korean War ==
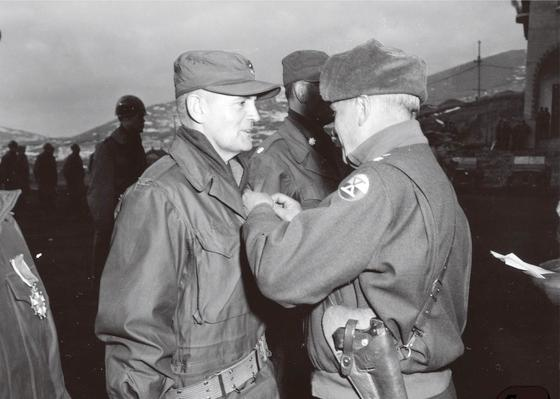
Col. Edward H. Forney, Deputy Chief of Staff, X Corps, receives Legion of Merit by MG Edward M. Almond, Commanding general X Corps, for his part in Hungnam Evacuation in December 1950.

Upon the surrender of Japan, Forney took part in the occupation duties near Nagasaki and finally returned to the United States in February 1946. He was subsequently promoted to the rank of colonel on May 1, 1948, and ordered to Washington, D.C., where assumed duties as advisor to the Inter-American Defense Board. Forney served in this capacity until December 1948, when he was ordered for instruction at Armed Forces Staff College in Norfolk, Virginia.

Forney graduated in July 1949 and joined Troop Training Unit, Amphibious Training Command, Pacific Fleet at Coronado, California, under the command of Brigadier General William S. Fellers. He served as Chief of Mobile Training Team Able and took part in the amphibious training of U.S. Pacific Fleet units. He was ordered to Japan in April 1950 in order to train army division for upcoming Operation Blue Hearts, landing at Pohang.

He was subsequently given additional temporary duty as assistant chief of staff for plans with 1st Cavalry Division under Major General Hobart R. Gay. Forney was later decorated with the Legion of Merit by the army for his service within amphibious training of army divisions in Japan and later with 1st Cavalry Division.

Colonel Forney was subsequently appointed deputy chief of staff, X Corps under Lieutenant General Edward M. Almond and his principal duties were to advise Almond on the use of Marine and navy forces. He took part in the Inchon Landing and recapture of Seoul in September 1950 and received Air Medal while engaged in observation flights over enemy held territory.

On November 27, 1950, Chinese launched massive offensive and sent 9th Army to infiltrate the northeastern part of North Korea. They surprised the X Corps units at the Chosin Reservoir area and quickly encircled 30,000 United Nations troops. The Chinese enriclement was later broken and U.N. forces retreated to the port city of Hungnam for evacuation. Colonel Forney was appointed Hungnam evacuation officer by General Almond and organized the withdrawal of over 100,000 servicemen – and their equipment, supplies, and vehicles – and evacuated over 100,000 North Korean refugees, the largest U.S. amphibious evacuation of civilians, under combat conditions, in American history.

Forney was decorated with second Legion of Merit for the organization of Hungnam evacuation and subsequently took part in the blockade of Wonsan. He was ordered to the United States at the beginning of June 1951 and assumed temporary command of Troop Training Unit, Amphibious Training Command, Pacific Fleet at Coronado, California. He held that command until he was relieved by Brigadier General John T. Selden one month later.

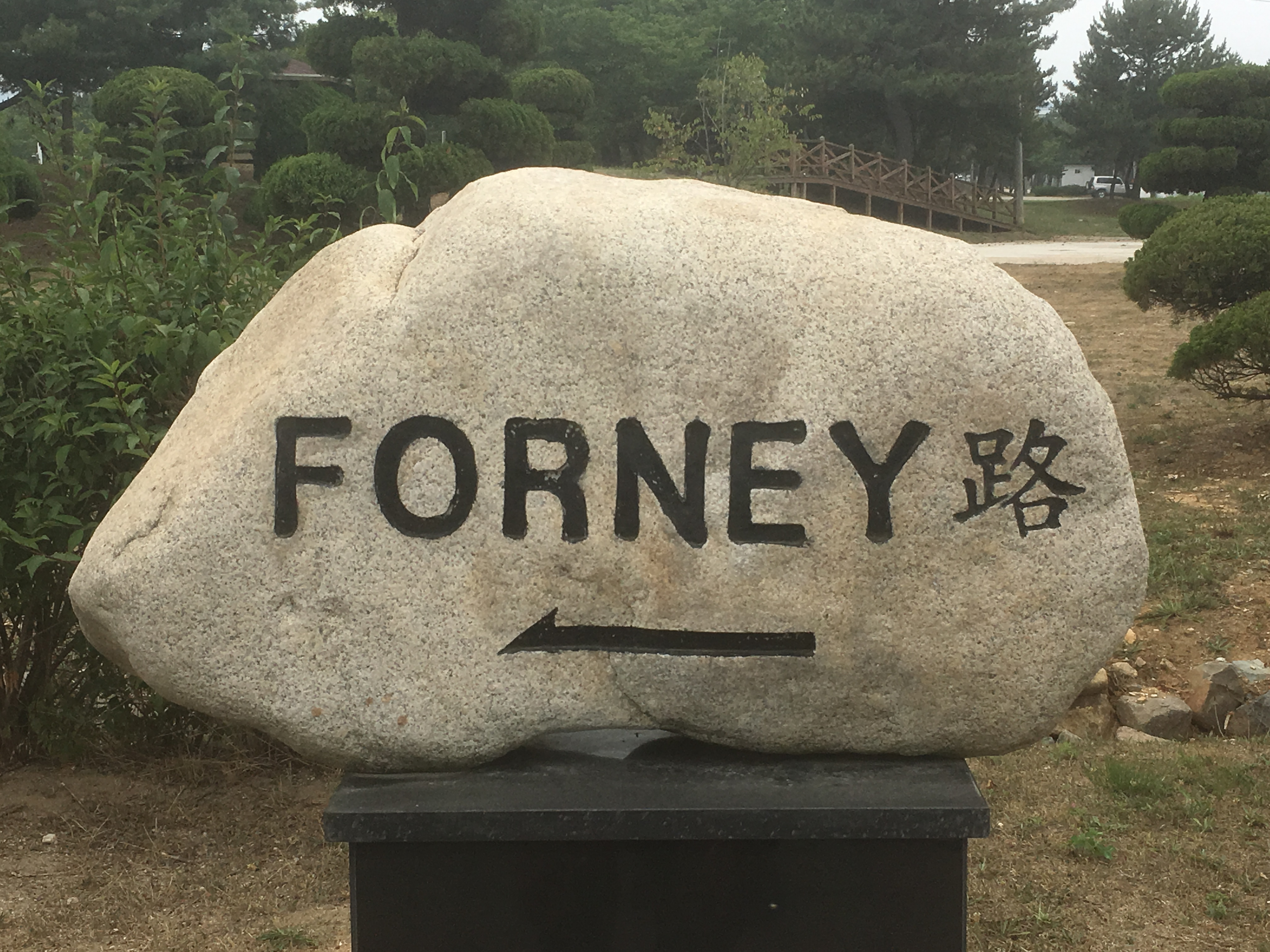
Stone commemorating the entrance to Forney Road on the ROK Marine Corps base in Pohang, South Korea. It opened in November 2010 at a ceremony involving the base commander and Forney's descendants.

He was ordered to Paris, France in September 1951 and spent next two years as an instructor at NATO Defense College. Forney then served assignments with the U.S. Element, Standing Group, NATO, Office of the Secretary of Defense (OSD), as a Member of the International Planning Teams and on U.S. Joint and Combined Committee.

In August 1956, Forney was attached to the Office of the Secretary of Defense in Washington, D.C., and served with assistant secretary for international security affairs as assistant for special programs until June 1957. Forney was subsequently ordered back to Korea and appointed commanding officer, U.S. Marine Corps Component, U.S. Naval Advisory Group. In this capacity he served as U.S. Marine Corps advisor to the Republic of Korea Marine Corps. During this time, Forney helped establish the 1st Marine Division base in Pohang, for which the division named a road in his honor in 2010. Forney retired from the Marine Corps after 28 years of active service in June 1959 and was advanced to the rank of brigadier general for having been specially commended in combat. He also received Army Commendation Medal for his second tour of duty in Korea.

== Vietnam War ==
Following his retirement from the Marines, Forney assumed assignment as the Public Safety Advisor with the U.S. Operations Mission (USOM), Agency for International Development at the U.S. Embassy in Saigon, South Vietnam. While in this capacity, he had an opportunity to analyse the situation in the country and relationship between Vietnamese civilians and U.S. military. As a veteran of Haitian campaign, he used his own experiences and proposed that the United States operation in South Vietnam should not be tied in with the MAAG; but rather an effort to be linked with the Civil Guard, the Self-Defense Corps, and the local Militia in the village and boondock level. This would be similar to the Guardia effort in Nicaragua or the Gendarmerie operation in Haiti and Santo Domingo.

Forney met with then-Chief of Staff, Headquarters Marine Corps, Lieutenant general Wallace M. Greene in Saigon in February 1963 and discuss his conclusions with him. Unfortunately Forney's health began failing and he was diagnosed with the cancer. He lost his fight with the illness on January 21, 1965, and died in Letterman Army Hospital in San Francisco, California. He was buried with full military honors at Arlington National Cemetery, Virginia.

== Decorations ==
Here is the ribbon bar of Brigadier General Edward H. Forney:

1st Row	Legion of Merit with Oak Leaf Cluster		Bronze Star Medal with Combat "V"	Air Medal
2nd Row	Navy Commendation Medal with Combat "V"	Army Commendation Medal	Navy Unit Commendation	American Defense Service Medal
3rd Row	American Campaign Medal	Asiatic-Pacific Campaign Medal with four 3/16 inch service stars	World War II Victory Medal	Navy Occupation Service Medal
4th Row	National Defense Service Medal	Korean Service Medal with three 3/16 inch service stars	United Nations Korea Medal	Republic of Korea Presidential Unit Citation
Office of the Secretary of Defense Identification Badge
