= Henry Pierson Crowe =

United States Marine Corps officer

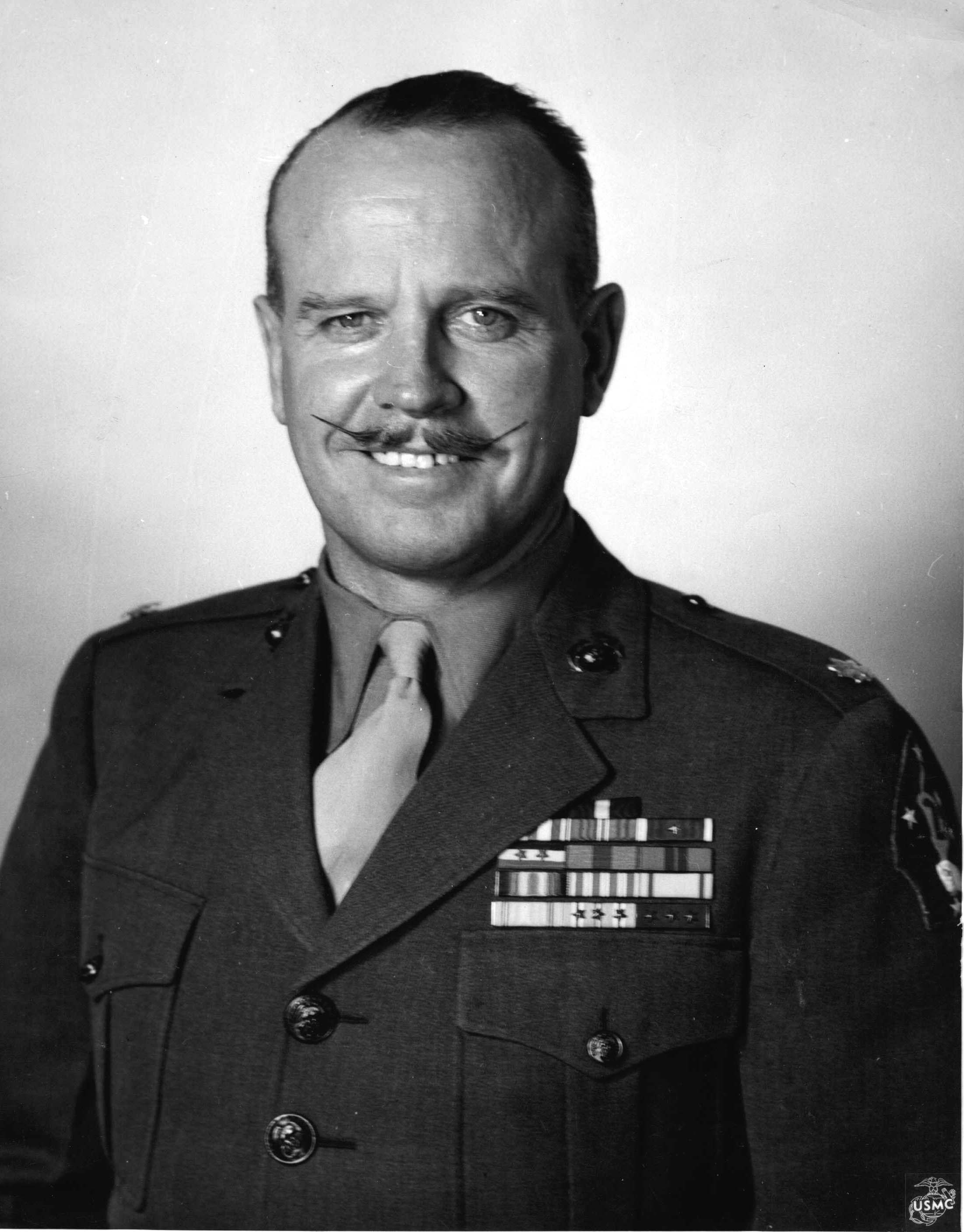
- Henry Pierson Crowe, Lt Col USMC
- Born: April 7, 1899; Boston, Kentucky, US
- Died: June 27, 1991 (aged 92); Portsmouth, Virginia, US
- Burial place: at sea
- Military career
- Allegiance: United States of America
- Branch: United States Marine Corps
- Service years: October 28, 1918–December 1919; 1921–March 1, 1960
- Rank: Colonel
- Nickname: Jim
- Service number: 0-5028
- Commands: regimental weapons co, 8th Marines 2nd Battalion, 8th Marines; 1st Shore Party Bn, 1st Marine Division; H&S Bn, Marine Corps Recruit Depot San Diego Marine Barracks, Norfolk Naval Shipyard
- Conflicts: World War I: no combat; World War II: Battle of Guadalcanal; Battle of Tarawa; Battle of Saipan; Korean War: Inchon Landing
- Awards: Navy Cross; Silver Star Medal; Distinguished Service Cross (United Kingdom); Legion of Merit (Combat V) (2); Bronze Star Medal (3 gold stars); Purple Heart Medal (gold star)
- Other work: Chief of Police, Portsmouth, VA (1960–1969)

Henry Pierson Crowe (March 7, 1899 – June 27, 1991) was a Marine of World War I, the Banana Wars, World War II, and the Korean War.

== Biography ==
Henry "Jim" Pierson Crowe was born March 7, 1899, in Boston, Kentucky, the fourth of the five children of Samuel Lee Crowe (1865–1921) and Alvada T. Crowe (1868–1942). After attending high school at Mount Pulaski, Illinois, for three years, he entered the Marine Corps on October 28, 1918. After boot camp at Marine Corps Recruit Depot Parris Island, he served in port security at Brest, France, under General Smedley D. Butler (after the World War I Armistice), returned as a private first class, and was discharged December 1919. He reenlisted in 1921. He served in the Dominican Republic (1921–1923), in Nicaragua (1928), and at various other posts and stations. He was also a frequent participant in local and national shooting competitions, winning the coveted Distinguished Marksman Medal in 1927.

Appointed a Marine Gunner (a warrant officer rank) in September 1934, he served on Pacific maneuvers and at several stations in the United States during the next two years. He embarked for China in October 1936, and after three years with the Marine Detachment at the American Embassy, Beiping, he returned to the U.S. in October 1939, to join the 6th Marine Regiment at San Diego, California. He was transferred to the 8th Marine Regiment in April 1940, and was promoted to chief Marine gunner in February 1941.

Chief Marine Gunner Crowe embarked with the 8th Marines for Samoa in January 1942, and the following month was promoted from chief gunner to captain. He was promoted to major in March 1943 and to lieutenant colonel in January 1944.

He commanded the regimental weapons company of the 8th Marines at Guadalcanal, where he was awarded both a Silver (U.S. Army) and Bronze Star Medal. He said there (January 13, 1943) "You'll never get a Purple Heart hiding in a foxhole! Follow me!"

He commanded 2d Battalion, 8th Marines, at Tarawa and Saipan. At Tarawa, his battalion landed from the USS Heywood (APA-6) on Beach Red-3.

He was awarded the Navy Cross and British Distinguished Service Cross at Tarawa, and the Purple Heart with Gold Star in lieu of a second award for wounds received at Saipan.

Lieutenant Colonel Crowe served with the 8th Marines in New Zealand and Hawaii before he returned to the United States in September 1944, for treatment of wounds sustained at Saipan. He was released from the U.S. Naval Hospital at San Diego in March 1945, and the following month was named Training Officer of Fleet Marine Force, Pacific, at Pearl Harbor, Territory of Hawaii.

After the war's end, Lt Col Crowe served briefly with the 29th Marines in China, and with Marine Garrison Forces, 14th Naval District, at Pearl Harbor. He returned to the United States in March 1946, and after duty at San Diego and Quantico, Virginia, entered the Senior Course in the Amphibious Warfare School at Quantico in September 1947. He completed the course in May 1948, and reported to the 1st Marine Division at Camp Pendleton, California, the following month. There, he served as a battalion executive officer, as division special services officer, played himself in a cameo in the film Sands of Iwo Jima and was executive officer of the 1st Shore Party Battalion before taking command of the unit in July 1950.

He arrived in Japan in August 1950 to assist in preparations for the Inchon landing in Korea. He remained with the 1st Shore Party Battalion, 1st Marine Division from September 1950 to May 1951 and was awarded the two Legions of Merit with Combat "V" (one by the army) for outstanding service during the Inchon-Seoul Campaign and Wonsan landing. He returned to the United States in May 1951.

Lieutenant Colonel Crowe was promoted to colonel in December 1951, while serving as chief of the Tactical School Section, Troop Training Unit, Amphibious Training Command, at Coronado, California. He later served there as chief of the Administrative Schools Section before assuming command of the headquarters and service battalion at Marine Corps Recruit Depot San Diego, in January 1953. He was assigned additional duties as a technical advisor for the movie Battle Cry (December 1953–June 1954). Following his detachment from San Diego, he completed his final tour of duty June 1957 to March 1960, as commanding officer, Marine Barracks, Norfolk Naval Shipyard, Portsmouth, Virginia.

Colonel Crowe retired from active duty March 1, 1960, after 40 years service in the Marine Corps, including 14 1/2 years as an enlisted man and seven and a half years as a warrant officer. Immediately after retirement, he served as Chief of Police in Portsmouth, Virginia, for nine years, retiring in 1969. He died on June 27, 1991, in Portsmouth after a long illness. As he had instructed, his remains were cremated and his ashes scattered at sea.

He was memorialized in the Tarawa diorama at the Marine Corps Museum, then in the Washington Navy Yard, that depicted him standing on the coconut log seawall.

In addition to the decorations already mentioned, Col Crowe's awards also include the Presidential Unit Citation Ribbon with three bronze stars; the Good Conduct Medal with three bronze stars; the World War I Victory Medal; the Expeditionary Medal; the Second Dominican Campaign Medal; the Second Nicaraguan Campaign Medal; the China Service Medal; the American Defense Service Medal; the Asiatic-Pacific Area Campaign Medal with three bronze stars; the World War II Victory Medal; the National Defense Service Medal; the Korean Service Medal with three bronze stars and the United Nations Service Medal.

== Navy Cross ==
Crowe's leadership during action against enemy Japanese forces at Betio Island earned him the Navy Cross.

The citation reads:

The President of the United States takes pleasure in presenting the Navy Cross to Henry Pierson Crowe (0-5028), Major, U.S. Marine Corps, for extraordinary heroism and distinguished service while serving as Commanding Officer of the Second Battalion, Eighth Marines, Second Marine Division, in action against enemy Japanese forces at Betio Island, Tarawa Atoll, Gilbert Islands, from 20 to 22 November 1943. Courageously leading his Battalion ashore in the face of savage enemy resistance, Major Crowe maintained continuous aggressive pressure for three days from the limited beachhead established by his command in the midst of Japanese emplacements and strongholds. Constantly exposing himself to hostile fire and working without rest, he effectively coordinated the efforts of his own hard-pressed Battalion, attached units and subsequent reinforcement, directing their combined attacks skillfully and with unwavering determination, and succeeded in overcoming one of the most heavily defended Japanese centers of resistance on Tarawa Atoll. Major Crowe's inspiring leadership, brilliant tactical ability and indomitable fighting spirit under extremely perilous conditions reflect great credit upon himself, his valiant command and the United States Naval Service.

== Awards and honors ==
Colonel Crowe's medals and decorations include:

1st Row	Navy Cross	Silver Star	Legion of Merit w/ valor device and award star	Bronze Star w/ 3 award stars
2nd Row	Purple Heart w/ 1 award star	Navy Presidential Unit Citation w/ 3 stars	Good Conduct Medal w/ three bronze stars	World War I Victory Medal
3rd Row	Marine Corps Expeditionary Medal	Second Dominican Campaign Medal	Second Nicaraguan Campaign Medal	China Service Medal
4th Row	American Defense Service Medal	American Campaign Medal	Asiatic-Pacific Campaign Medal w/ three Bronze Stars	World War II Victory Medal
5th Row	National Defense Service Medal	Korean Service Medal w/ four bronze service stars	British Distinguished Service Cross	United Nations Service Medal
