= Senator Bolton =

Senator Bolton may refer to:

- Chester C. Bolton (1882–1939), Ohio State Senate
- William P. Bolton (1885–1964), Maryland State Senate
