= 3rd Littoral Anti-Air Battalion =

3d Littoral Anti-Air Battalion
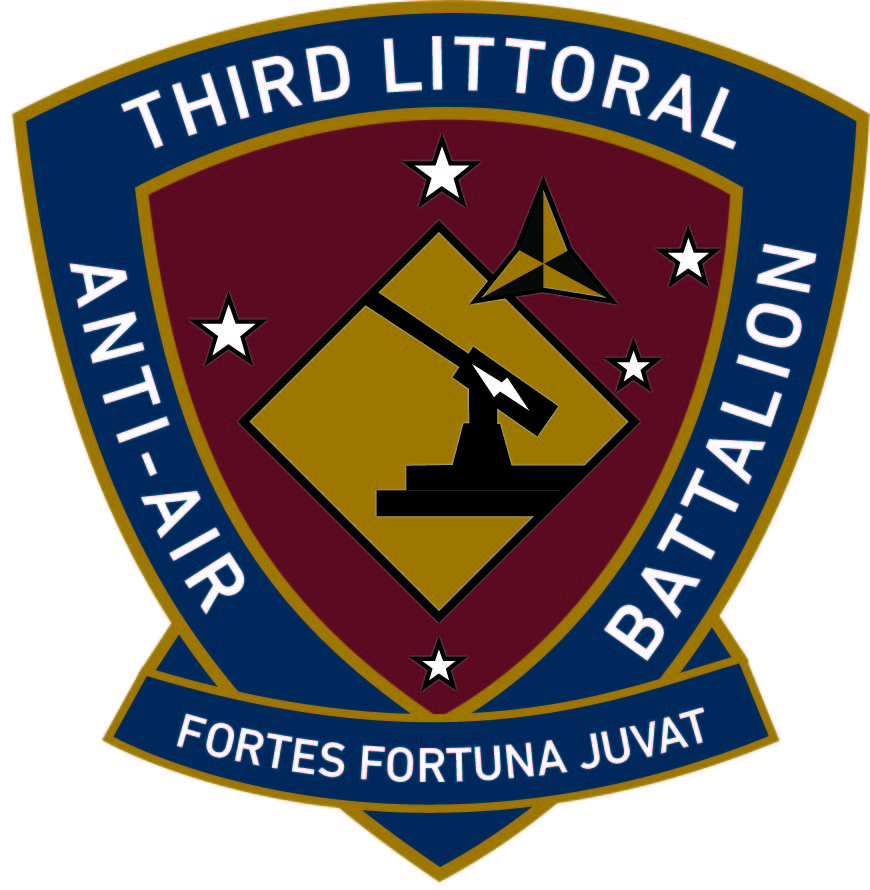
- 3d LAAB insignia
- Active: 20 Jul 1939 – 15 Dec 1944 11 Oct 1951 – 30 Sep 1994 11 Feb 2022 - Present
- Country: United States of America
- Branch: United States Marine Corps
- Type: Command and control Air Defense
- Part of: 3rd Marine Littoral Regiment; 3rd Marine Division
- Nickname: Riptide
- Mottos: Fortes Fortuna Juvat "Fortune Favors the Bold"
- Engagements: World War II: Attack on Pearl Harbor; Battle of Midway; Battle of Guadalcanal; Battle of Bougainville; Cuban Missile Crisis Gulf War

Commanders
- Current commander: LtCol Matthew E. Sladek
- Notable commanders: Robert H. Pepper; Edward H. Forney

3rd Littoral Anti-Air Battalion (3d LAAB) is a United States Marine Corps aviation command and control and air defense unit that is optimized for operations in the first island chain. The battalion is based at Marine Corps Base Hawaii and falls under the command of the 3rd Marine Littoral Regiment and the 3rd Marine Division.

Originally formed prior to World War II, the battalion was known as the 3rd Defense Battalion and took part in combat operations at Pearl Harbor, Midway, Guadalcanal and Bougainville. The unit was decommissioned in late 1944 but was brought back into service as the Marine Corps began to transition to Surface-to-air missiles for its air defense needs in the early 1950s. During the mid to late 1950s, the battalion was based at Marine Corps Air Ground Combat Center Twentynine Palms in California and was one of two Marine Corps units that operated the land-based version of the RIM-2 Terrier Missile. In January 1963, 3rd LAAM battalion was moved to Marine Corps Air Station Cherry Point, North Carolina eventually falling under the command of Marine Air Control Group 28 (MACG-28) and the 2nd Marine Aircraft Wing (2nd MAW). 3rd LAAM Battalion's final combat tour saw it providing air defense for the Marine Corps area of operations during Operation Desert Shield/Desert Storm. 3rd LAAM Battalion was decommissioned again on 30 September 1994, as part of the post-Cold War draw down of forces and because the Marine Corps had made the decision to divest itself of its medium-range air defense.

The battalion was reactivated on 11 February 2022, as part of the Commandant of the Marine Corps Force Design 2030 initiative.

== History ==
=== Early years ===
The defense battalions were first conceived from the fixed defense concept during the Marine Corps', as well the United States Navy's, critical change in their traditional sea service role to a more "aggressive" amphibious landing force. The first battalions were created in 1939, when the outbreak of World War II caused concerns that overseas bases might be attacked by the Imperial Japanese Navy.

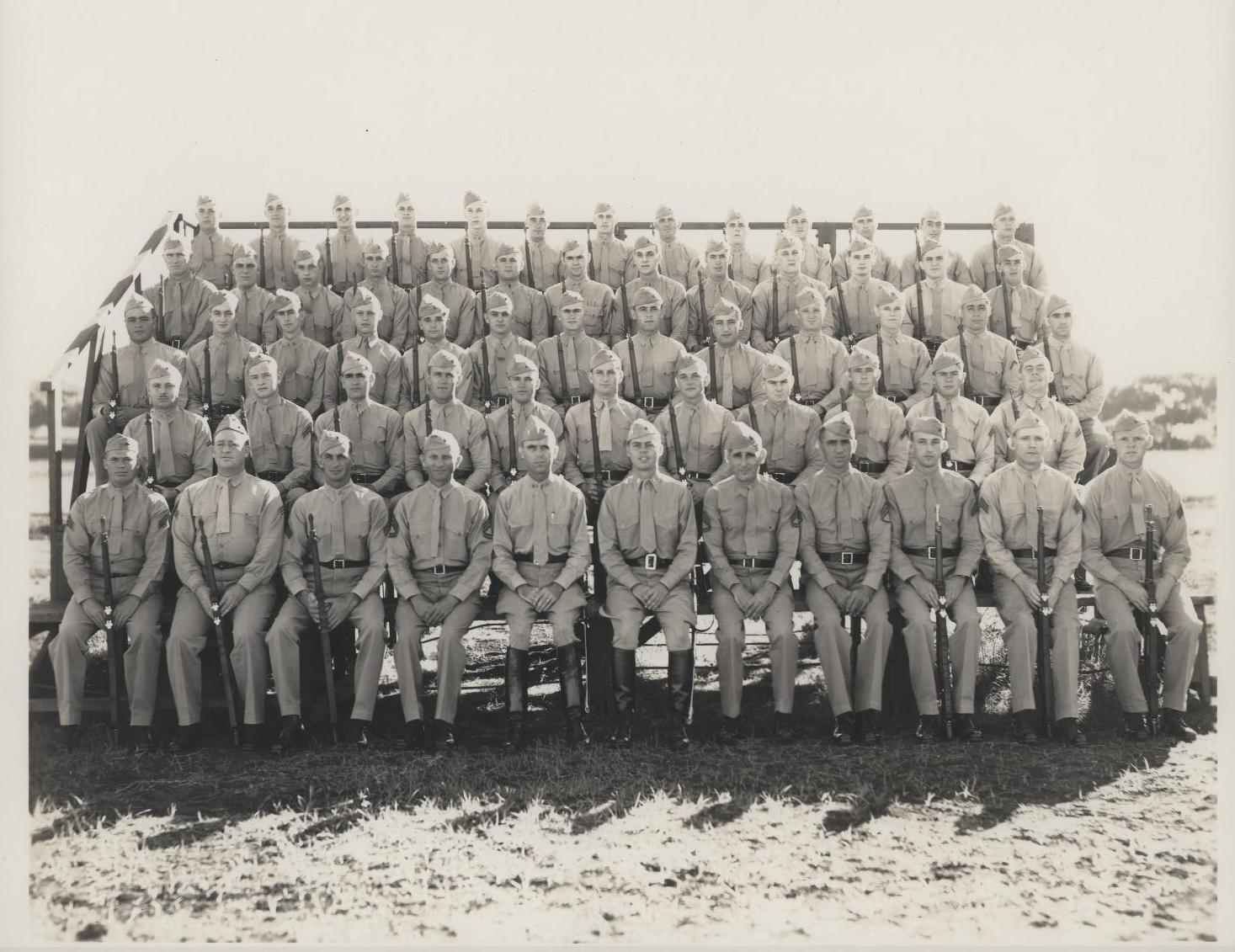
Battery G, 3d Defense Battalion, Pearl Harbor, 1940

The 1st Antiaircraft Battalion was commissioned on 20 July 1937 at Marine Corps Base Quantico, Virginia. 1st Battalion, 15th Marines was officially organized at Marine Corps Base Quantico, Virginia on 19 December 1938 with the establishment of a Headquarters and Service Battery on top of the already existing" "A Battery (3" AA Guns) and "B" Battery (Machine Guns). The battalion moved to Marine Corps Base Paris Island, South Carolina in early October 1939 and was redesignated as the 3rd Defense Battalion on 10 October 1939 under Lieutenant colonel Robert H. Pepper. By December 1939 the battalion consisted of a Headquarters & Services Battery, the 5" Artillery Unit (H&S, A, B, and C Batteries), the 3" AAA Unit (H&S, D, E, and F Batteries), Battery G (Searchlights), Battery H (.50 cal Machine Guns) and Battery I (.30 cal Machine Guns). After winter training on Parris Island and Hilton Head Island, the battalion boarded USS Chaumont on 5 April 1940 at Charleston, South Carolina. They sailed for Pearl Harbor, Territory of Hawaii arriving on 7 May 1940. A number of Marine Corps defense battalions were sent to the Pacific during this time period in order to defend outlying American possessions as detailed in War Plan Orange. During their first 8 months in Hawaii the battalion supplied numerous reconnaissance and advance parties to begin the preliminary work of supplying and defending the installation on Midway Island. On 27 January 1941 the Chief of Naval Operations directed the 3rd Defense Battalion to move to Midway. They arrived at Midway on 14 February 1941 and remained garrisoned there 11 September when they were relieved by the 6th Defense Battalion. 3rd Defense Battalion returned to Hawaii on 15 September 1941 on board USS Wharton.

=== World War II ===
==== Pearl Harbor & Midway ====
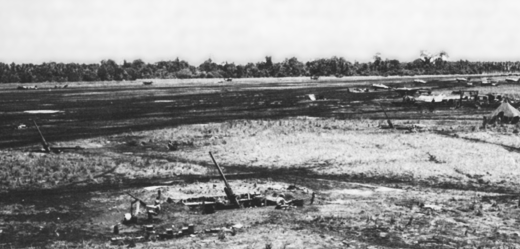
90MM antiaircraft guns of the 3rd Defense Battalion point skyward at Henderson Field on Guadalcanal alert against the attacks of Japanese bombers in September 1942. (USMC 61608)

The battalion was stationed at the Marine Barracks, Pearl Harbor during the 7 December 1941 attack on Pearl Harbor. Immediately following the events at Pearl Harbor, 3rd Defense Battalion provided reinforcements for the outlying US garrisons at Midway, Johnston, and Palmyra Islands. During this time the battalion also added two additional batteries in May 1942, Battery K under the Machine Gun Group and Battery L (20 mm AA Btry).

On 22 May 1942 the battalion's anti-aircraft group consisting of H&S, D, E, F, L & K batteries were sent back to Midway Island via USS Kitty Hawk. They arrived at Midway on 26 March and would take part in the Battle of Midway on 4–5 June 1942. Following the fighting at Midway the detachment returned to Hawaii on 15 June 1942. At this time the 3’ AA Group was re-designated as the 90mm Group and the Machine Gun Group was re-designated as the Machine Gun Group. Searchlight battery was made part of the 90mm Group at this time. After the reorganization, the battalion spent most of July 1942 preparing for future offensive amphibious operations.

==== Guadalcanal Campaign ====
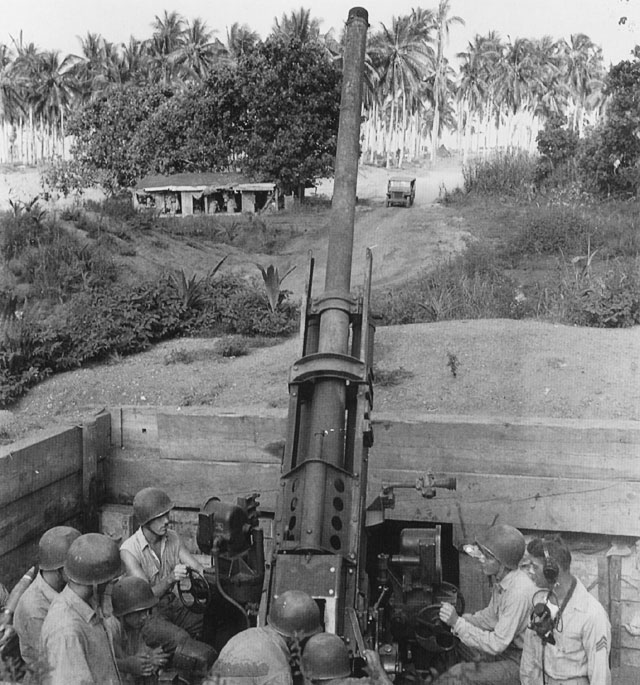
3rd Defense Battalion with a 90 mm antiaircraft gun at Guadalcanal

On 21 July 1942 the battalion embarked upon USS Zeilin and USS Betelgeuse heading for Guadalcanal. On 7 August 1942, the 3rd Defense Battalion, landed along with the 1st Marine Division's on Guadalcanal and Tulagi. 3rd Defense Battalion troops on USS Zeilin were disembarked at Tulagi while USS Betelgeuse off-loaded Marines on Guadalcanal. The battalion participated in the defense of the islands against numerous Japanese counterattacks over the ensuing months. The battalions machine gun and antiaircraft artillery units were able to get ashore almost immediately however the seacoast artillery units were not able to establish themselves until the end of August. The battalions 90mm anti-aircraft guns were emplaced on the periphery of Henderson Field on 12 August. The battalion established its SCR-270 near the 1st Marine Aircraft Wing's pagoda in the vicinity of Henderson Field. During these early stages of the battle, 3rd Defense Battalion was tasked with providing air and coastal defense for the nascent Marine Corps beachhead surrounding Henderson Field. The battalion participated in the month's long struggle for control of the island. In mid-October, during the main Japanese counter-offensive, the battalion was assigned defensive responsibilities along the Lunga River. During this time they also scored several direct hits against Japanese shipping that wandered too close to their guns. The battalion, less the 5" Battery on Tulagi, departed Guadalcanal on 9 February 1943 on board USS George Clymer sailing for New Zealand. It was the last unit of the original invasion force to depart the island. The battalion disembarked at Wellington, New Zealand on 16 February 1943 and headed for Solway near Masterton the following day. The battalion remained in New Zealand until September 1943 focusing on rest, rehabilitation and training. On 12 September 1943 the battalion departed New Zealand to return to Guadalcanal. The battalion was transferred in four echelons embarked upon USS Libra, USS Crescent City, USS Hunter Liggett, and USS Fomalhaut. Once the entire battalion had arrived by 6 October 1943 they began to conduct training and rehearsals for the next major assault which was to take place on Bougainville.

==== Bougainville and deactivation ====
3rd Defense Battalion embarked upon amphibious shipping at Guadalcanal on 26 October 1943. The battalion was spread between USS Alchiba, USS Alhena, USS Libra, USS Titania and USS George Clymer. On 1 November 1943 the 90 mm AA Batteries and Special Weapons Group of the 3rd Defense Battalion landed at Cape Torokina at Empress Augusta Bay under the command of lieutenant colonel Edward H. Forney right behind the first waves of assault troops. On 7 November, the Japanese successfully landed four destroyer-loads of men just beyond the eastern limit of the American beachhead. 3rd Defense Battalion was part of the Marine contingent that annihilated this force the next day in the Battle of Koromokina Lagoon. On 28–29 November, in an effort to block reinforcements from the Japanese 23rd Infantry Regiment, the 1st Marine Parachute Battalion carried out a raid on Koiari, about 9.3 miles (15 km) from Torokina. After landing unopposed, the Japanese counterattacked heavily and the Marines, facing being overrun, had to be rescued by landing craft, which took three attempts to get ashore. Protective fires from the 155mm guns of the 3rd Defense Battalion helped keep the Marines from being overrun until they could be withdrawn. 3rd Defense Battalion remained on Bougainville until 21 June 1944 when it was finally withdrawn. It was the last unit that had landed the previous November that still remained on the island. Prior to their move, the battalion was re-designated as the 3rd Antiaircraft Artillery Battalion attached to the III Amphibious Corps. Upon their return to Guadalcanal the battalion set out building a camp on the beach near the village of Tetere. The battalion was still at this location on 26 November 1944 received orders directing he immediate deactivation of the battalion. They were officially deactivated on 15 December 1944.

=== Reactivation and surface-to-air missiles ===
On 11 October 1951 the 1st Provisional Marine Guided Missile Battalion was activated at Naval Ordnance Test Station, China Lake, California. On 1 February 1955 the battalion was renamed the 1st Terrier Surface-to-Air Missile Battalion and shortly thereafter on 1 June 1956 it was moved to Marine Corps Training Center, Twentynine Palms, CA. On that same day the battalion was redesignated as the 1st Medium Antiaircraft Missile Battalion (1st MAAM Bn).

=== Transition to HAWK, Cuban crisis and relocation ===
The Marine Corps began to transition its various ari defense units to the MIM-23 HAWK Missile in 1960. 1st LAAM Battalion was the first to transition on 2 May 1960 followed by 2nd LAAM Battalion which stood up shortly thereafter on 1 August 1960. 1st MAAM Battalion was the next to get re-designated when it was re-designated as the 3rd Light Antiaircraft Missile Battalion on 1 December 1961. As part of this transition, the Marine Corps stoodup an inter-battalion HAWK School in order for these missilemen to receive instruction on the HAWK missile that had previously been given at Fort Bliss, Texas.

On 18 October 1962, as the Cuban Missile Crisis was unfolding, CINCLANT requested the transfer of a light antiaircraft missile battalion from United States Pacific Command. 3rd LAAM Battalion at Marine Corps Base 29 Palms was directed to deploy to Guantanamo Bay Naval Base, Cuba. Beginning on 23 October 1962, the battalion was moved by airlift from George Air Force Base to Marine Corps Air Station Cherry Point, North Carolina. The airlift required 92 sorties and was complete on 25 October 1962. A site survey of the Guantanamo Bay base showed that only one battery of HAWK missiles could be installed on the small area of the Navy base. Charlie Battery, 3rd LAAM Battalion with its 48 HAWK Missiles was selected to go forward to Guantanamo Bay and was subsequently airlifted there. Upon arrival the battery was attached to Marine Aircraft Group 32 (MAG 32) and emplaced on John Paul Jones Hill, the highest point on Guantanamo Bay. At the conclusion of the crisis the battalion returned to MCB 29 Palms on 13 December 1962. only to be informed later that month that they would be permanently transferring to MCAS Cherry Point. 3rd LAAM officially departed MCB 29 Palms on 15 January 1963.

3rd LAAM Battalion did not support combat operations in Vietnam during the conflict. They remained on the east coast participating in air defense exercises up and down the coast and throughout the Caribbean.

=== 1970s & 1980s ===
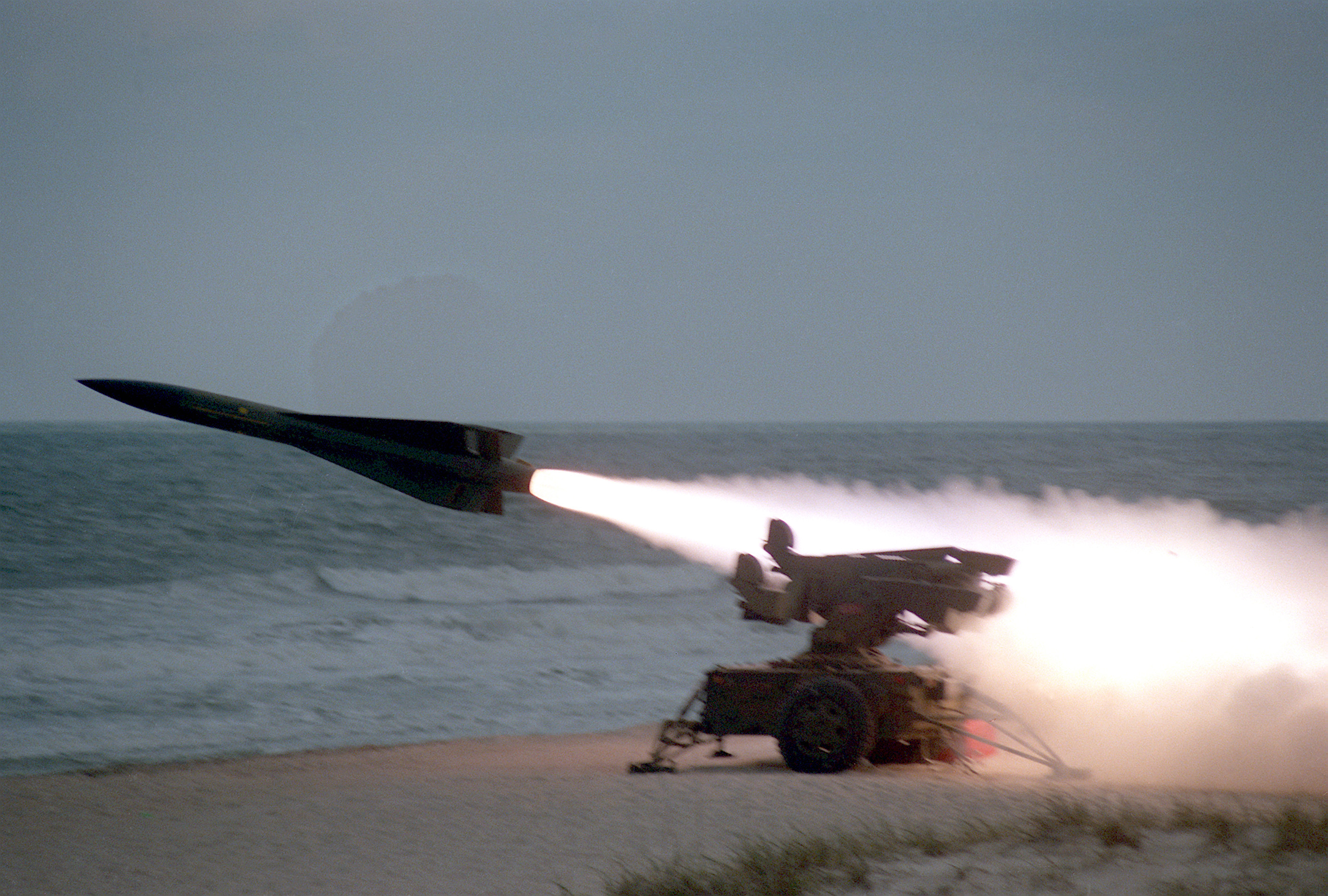
An MIM-23 Hawk missile is fired by the 3rd Light Anti-aircraft Missile Battalion during a training exercise at Marine Corps Base Camp Lejeune, North Carolina

=== Gulf War and deactivation ===
On 15 August 1990, "B" Battery, 3rd LAAM Battalion boarded USS Spartanburg County at Morehead City, NC to support Operation Desert Shield in Southwest Asia as part of the 4th Marine Expeditionary Brigade (4th MEB). They arrived in Saudi Arabia on 14 October and were placed under the operational control of 2nd Light Antiaircraft Missile Battalion (2nd LAAM) who had arrived a month earlier. The remainder of 3rd LAAM did not depart until December. The commanding officer and 63 Marines flew into theater as part of the battalion's advanced party arriving on 25 December while the main body, which departed 14 December, arrived via the merchant ship "Sterna Trader" on 4 January 1991. 3rd LAAM's "A" Battery was sent to Bahrain to provide air defense for Shaikh Isa Air Base while the remainder of "B" Battery remained in Saudi Arabia. HAWK Batteries from 2nd and 3rd LAAM Battalions covered the 1st and 2nd Marine Divisions at the breach point where they entered Kuwait. The batteries were tied in with the Tactical Air Operations Center (TAOC) run by Marine Air Control Squadron 2 (MACS-2) for the air defense picture. No HAWK missile engagement took place during the conflict. On 11 March 1991 the battalion began preparation for retrograde back to their home station.

Upon their return from overseas the battalion participated in the Desert Storm Victory Parade in Raleigh, North Carolina.

On 15 May 1994, 3rd LAAM Battalion received word that it was going to be deactivated. On 29 August 1994 the battalion held its formal deactivation ceremony which was attended by the leadership of the 2nd Marine Aircraft Wing and numerous former commanding officers of the battalion. On 30 September, the commanding officer, LtCol Thomas Adkins, oversaw the last official task of 3rd LAAM Battalion which consisted of its final unit diary entry stating "DEACTD AS RUC 23960, HIST: 3D LAAM, AUTH:MCBUL 5400."

=== Reactivation as 3d LAAB ===
3d Littoral Anti-Air Battalion was reactivated at MCB Kaneohe Bay, Hawaii on 11 February 2022. When fully operational, the battalion will provide ground based air defense, early warning, tactical air control, and Forward arming and refuelling points in support of Marine Corps littoral operations.

== Unit awards ==
A unit citation or commendation is an award bestowed upon an organization for the action cited. Members of the unit who participated in said actions are allowed to wear on their uniforms the awarded unit citation. The 3rd Littoral Anti-Air Battalion has been presented with the following awards:

| Streamer | Award | Year(s) | Additional Info |
|---|---|---|---|
| | Presidential Unit Citation Streamer | 1942 | Guadalcanal |
| | Joint Meritorious Unit Award Streamer | 1990 | |
| | Navy Unit Commendation Streamer | 1990–1991 | Southwest Asia |
| | Meritorious Unit Commendation Streamer | 1984-85 | |
| | American Defense Service Streamer with one Bronze Star | 1941 | World War II |
| | Asiatic-Pacific Campaign Streamer with one Silver & one Bronze Stars | 1941-1944 | Pearl Harbor, Midway, Guadalcanal, Northern Solomons, Bougainville |
| | National Defense Service Streamer with three Bronze Stars | 1951-53, 1961–1974, 1990–1995, 2022- | Korean War, Vietnam War, Gulf War, GWOT |
| | Southwest Asia Service Streamer with two Bronze Stars | September 1990 – February 1991 | Desert Shield, Desert Storm |
| | Global War on Terrorism Service Streamer | 2022–present | |

== See also ==
- Marine defense battalions
- United States Marine Corps Aviation
- List of United States Marine Corps aviation support units
- History of ground based air defense in the United States Marine Corps
