= Hugh Meade =

American politician (1907–1949)

Member of the U.S. House of Representatives from Maryland's 2nd district
- In office January 3, 1947 – January 3, 1949
- Succeeded by: William P. Bolton

Member of the Maryland House of Representatives from the 3rd district
- In office 1935–1936

Personal details
- Born: April 4, 1907 Netcong, New Jersey, U.S.
- Died: July 8, 1949 (aged 42) Washington, D.C., U.S.
- Resting place: New Cathedral Cemetery; Baltimore, Maryland, U.S.
- Party: Democratic
- Spouse: Isabel Muth (m. 1931)
- Children: 6
- Education: Loyola College in Maryland (BA); University of Maryland Law School
- Occupation: Lawyer; politician

Hugh Allen Meade (April 4, 1907 – July 8, 1949) was an American politician and lawyer from Maryland. He served as a member of the Maryland House of Delegates from 1935 to 1936. He would later serve as a U.S. Congressman, representing the second district of Maryland from 1947 to 1949.

== Early life ==
Hugh Allen Meade was born on April 4, 1907, in Netcong, Morris County, New Jersey, to Jeremiah P. Meade. He attended public schools in Netcong. He moved to Baltimore, Maryland in 1923 to live with his aunt and uncle, Mr. and Mrs. Francis X. Donnelly. He graduated from Loyola High School in 1925, and from Loyola College in Maryland in 1929 with a Bachelor of Arts. He later graduated from the University of Maryland Law School in 1932. He was a member of the Phi Kappa Sigma fraternity. He also played football in college. He was admitted to the bar in 1933.

== Career ==
Meade began practicing law in Baltimore. He served as secretary to Governor Albert Ritchie in 1934. He served as a member of the Maryland House of Delegates, representing Baltimore City, district 3, from 1935 to 1936. He resigned his seat to become supervisor of assessments of the city of Baltimore. He served until 1938 and was then Assistant Attorney General of Maryland from 1938 to 1946.

During World War II, Meade served in the United States Navy as a lieutenant (junior grade) in 1944 and 1945. He resigned from the attorney general's office in 1946 to enter the private practice of law.

Meade was elected as a Democrat in 1946 to the Eightieth Congress. He was an unsuccessful candidate for renomination in 1948, losing to William P. Bolton in the primary election. He served one full term from January 3, 1947, to January 3, 1949. He was a member of the Merchant Marine and Fisheries Committee. He advocated for an investigation into the American occupational conditions in Germany. He also appealed to President Harry S. Truman to appoint a nonpartisan committee to investigate food prices and introduced a bill to embargo shipments to Russia. He suggested a tuberculosis hospital at the intersection of Loch Raven Boulevard and Alameda in Baltimore. He also attacked the proposed St. Lawrence River seaway project and worked for the advancement of the Port of Baltimore.

After Congress, Meade was appointed general counsel of the Merchant Marine and Fisheries Committee of the United States House of Representatives in January 1949 and served until his death. In 1949, he represented two Baltimore firms that advertise optometry and helped them fight a bill that defined the practice of optometry as a learned profession to the House Committee on Public Health and Welfare.

== Personal life ==
Meade married Isabel Muth, daughter of Charles Muth, in 1931. They had six children, Mary Isabel, Hugh A. Jr., Charles Philip, Margaret Alice, James, and John. He was a member of St. Mary's Catholic Church in Govans, Baltimore. He was also a member of the American Legion, Baltimore Country Club, Merchants Club, and the American Law Institute. He lived on North Charles Street in Baltimore.

Meade died of a heart attack on July 8, 1949, at his hotel room at Willard Hotel in Washington, D.C. He is interred in the New Cathedral Cemetery in Baltimore.

U.S. House of Representatives
Preceded by H. Streett Baldwin	U.S. Congressman from the 2nd district of Maryland; 1947–1949	Succeeded by William P. Bolton
