= William P. Bolton =

United States congressman

Member of the U.S. House of Representatives from Maryland's 2nd district
- In office January 3, 1949 – January 3, 1951
- Preceded by: Hugh A. Meade
- Succeeded by: James Devereux

Personal details
- Born: William P. Bolton; July 2, 1885 Whiteford, Maryland
- Died: November 22, 1964 (aged 79) Baltimore, Maryland, U.S.
- Resting place: Mount Maria Cemetery, Towson, Maryland
- Party: Democratic

William P. Bolton (July 2, 1885 – November 22, 1964) was a one-term U.S. Congressman who represented the second district of Maryland from 1949 to 1951 until defeated by Republican General James Devereux.

Born near Whiteford, Maryland, Bolton attended the public schools and St. Francis Parochial School in Baltimore County, Maryland. He graduated from the University of Baltimore Law School in 1909, and became a lawyer in private practice. He served as trial magistrate in Towson, Maryland, from 1941 to 1946.

Bolton served in the Maryland State Senate from 1946 to 1948. He was elected as a Democrat to the Eighty-first Congress, serving from January 3, 1949, to January 3, 1951. He was an unsuccessful candidate for reelection to the Eighty-second Congress in 1950 and again in 1954.

During his short time in the Maryland Senate he proposed a far reaching amendment to the Maryland Constitution that was approved by the city of Baltimore voters to limit the city's ability to annex portions of Baltimore County, something that was previously a right of the city. This amendment, Question 5, was approved on November 2, 1948, by a majority of the city voters: 139,974 to 103,687.

After Congress, Bolton served as director of Baltimore County Civil Defense in 1951, and died in Baltimore in 1964. He is interred in Mount Maria Cemetery of Towson.

U.S. House of Representatives
Preceded by Hugh A. Meade	U.S. Congressman from the 2nd district of Maryland; 1949–1951	Succeeded by James Devereux
