= Bertram A. Bone =

U.S. Marine Corps Brigadier General (1893–1961)

Bertram Allison Bone
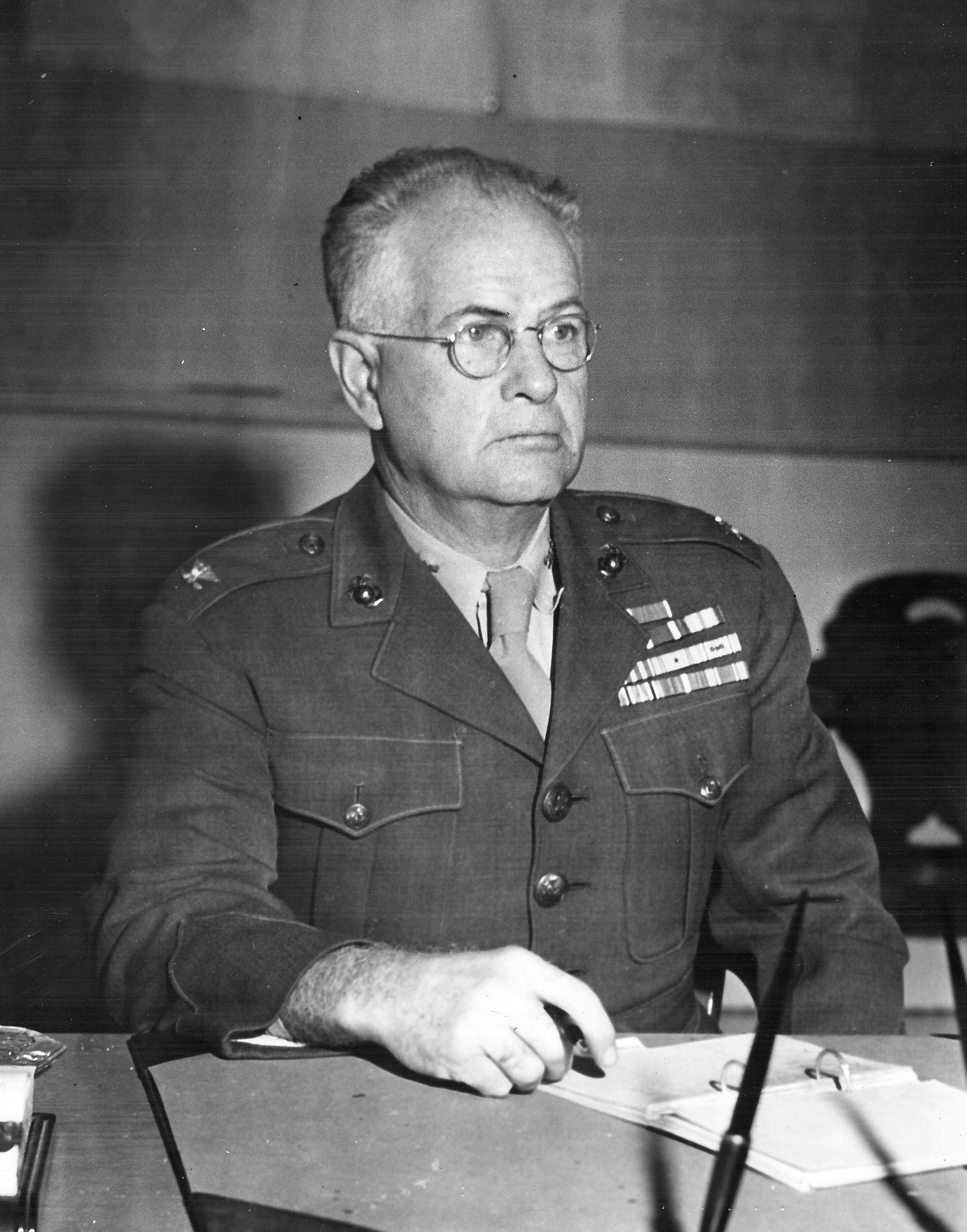
- Bertram A. Bone as colonel, USMC
- Born: September 19, 1893; San Diego, California, US
- Died: October 22, 1961 (aged 68); San Diego, California, US
- Burial place: Fort Rosecrans National Cemetery
- Military career
- Allegiance: United States
- Branch: United States Marine Corps
- Service years: 1917–1949
- Rank: Brigadier general
- Nickname: "Bert"
- Service number: 0-92
- Commands: 10th Marine Regiment; 1st Defense Battalion; 2nd Defense Battalion
- Conflicts: World War I Nicaraguan Campaign; World War II: Attack on Pearl Harbor; Battle of Leyte; Battle of Okinawa
- Awards: Legion of Merit; Navy Commendation Medal

Bertram Allison Bone (September 19, 1893 – October 22, 1961) was a decorated officer of the United States Marine Corps with the rank of brigadier general. He is most noted for his service as commanding officer, 1st Defense Battalion during the early phase of the World War II. He later served with V Amphibious Corps during Battle of Leyte and led 10th Marine Regiment during the Battle of Okinawa.

== Early years ==
Bertram A. Bone was born on September 19, 1893, in San Diego, California, and studied high school there. Upon the graduation, he attended University of California, Berkeley and graduated with Bachelor of Science degree in civil engineering in April 1917. He was commissioned second lieutenant in the Marine Corps one month later and ordered to the Basic School for further officers' training. Bone was subsequently attached to the Marine barracks at Mare Island Navy Yard and ordered for his duty overseas.

He was posted to the Marine detachment, American Legation in Peking, China, and spent next year and half with guard duties at American Embassy there. Bone returned to the United States in October 1919 and was attached to the Marine barracks at Naval Air Station San Diego. While there, he reached the rank of first lieutenant on June 4, 1920. Bone was ordered for his first tour of sea duty in February 1922, when he was attached to the Marine detachment aboard the cruiser USS Charleston. Aboard that vessel, he served within Destroyer Squadrons, Pacific Fleet until his promotion to the rank of captain on June 15, 1923.

He was then transferred to Marine Corps Base San Diego and served one year there, before was sent for the instruction at Marine Corps Schools, Quantico as a student of Company Officers' course. Bone graduated one year later and was appointed commanding officer of the Marine detachment aboard the battleships USS Tennessee. While aboard that vessel, he took part in the support actions of U.S. Marines during Second Nicaraguan Campaign.

Bone was later detached from "Tennessee" and ordered to instruction at the Army Field Artillery School at Fort Sill, Oklahoma. Upon graduation, he served at Marine Corps Base Quantico until he was ordered to command the Marine detachment aboard the battleship USS Nevada. He was promoted to the rank of major on October 30, 1934, and ordered to course at Army Field Service Ordnance School at Metuchen, New Jersey.

In January 1935, Bone was attached to the Bureau of Ordnance, Navy Department under Read Admiral Harold R. Stark. Bone was detached from Washington, D.C., in July 1938 and ordered for Senior Course at Marine Corps Schools, Quantico. He was then appointed instructor within reserve 15th Marine Regiment in San Diego.

== World War II ==
With the increasing danger of Japanese expansion in Pacific during 1939, chairman of navy's Special Board, Admiral Arthur J. Hepburn, recommended the activation of Marine defense battalions. These special marine units were designated the defense force of the Pacific naval bases and should be placed on Midway Atoll, Wake Island, Johnston Atoll and Palmyra Atoll. Bone was meanwhile promoted to the rank of lieutenant colonel in May 1939.

In November 1939, the 1st Defense Battalion was activated in San Diego with Bone as its commanding officer. As experienced artillery officer, Bone supervised the formation and initial training. His battalion consisted of the batteries with 5"/51 caliber guns, searchlight and aircraft sound locator and antiaircraft groups with M2 Browning and M1917 Browning machine guns and were ideal for the defense of the islands from the attack from the sea and air.

At the beginning of March 1940, 2nd Defense Battalion was activated at San Diego Base and Bone again supervised the formation. He handed over the command to Major Lewis A. Hohn in July of that year and retook command of 1st Defense Battalion.

His battalion was transferred to Hawaii in March 1941 and Bone was subsequently in charge of the construction of anti-aircraft, seacoast and beach defenses on Palmyra Atoll and the establishment of logistical facilities for his command there. In spite of a severe shortage of building materials and equipment and limited shipping facilities for procuring them, he displayed sound judgment and high professional skill in solving the many problems which confronted him.

During the Japanese Attack on Pearl Harbor on December 7, 1941, Bone was stationed on Hawaii and coordinated the trucks with ammunition. For his service on Palmyra atoll, he was decorated with Legion of Merit.

In May 1942, Bone was transferred to the staff of South Pacific Island Base Inspection Board under Rear Admiral Richard E. Byrd and travelled to the South Pacific Area as a member of the inspecting party. He was promoted to the rank of colonel on July 24, 1942.

During September of that year, Bone was transferred to Washington, D.C., and appointed Chief of the Gunnery Section, Division of Plans and Policies at Headquarters Marine Corps. He was tasked with the administrative work until April 1944, when he was ordered back to the Pacific area as Assistant Corps Artillery Commander and Artillery Executive Officer, V Amphibious Corps under Major General Harry Schmidt. Bone took part in the support actions during Battle of Leyte within Philippines Campaign and received the Navy Commendation Medal for his service.

Bone was appointed commanding officer of 10th Marine Regiment stationed on Saipan at the beginning of January 1945. His regiment participated within 2nd Marine Division in the Okinawa campaign in April 1945. The 10th Marines served as floating reserve force, and Bone did not see combat.

== Retirement ==
Colonel Bone was appointed officer in charge of the Ordnance Section, Service Command Fleet Marine Force, Pacific under Major General Earl C. Long. In this capacity, Bone was co-responsible for the supply, salvage, evacuation, construction, personnel management, quartering and sanitation needs of all FMFPac units and other marine units in its area. He was ordered back to the States in May 1946 and following the brief leave home, he was appointed commanding officer of the Recruit Depot within Marine Corps Base San Diego under Major General Leo D. Hermle. In this capacity, he was responsible for the recruit training of all new marines on the West Coast of the United States.

When Marine Corps Base San Diego was redesignated Marine Corps Recruit Depot in January 1948, Bone was appointed assistant chief of staff for operations and training. He served in this capacity until his retirement on June 30, 1949. Bone was advanced to the rank of brigadier general for having been specially commended in combat.

He settled in his native San Diego and died on October 22, 1961.

== Decorations ==
Here is the ribbon bar of Brigadier General Bertram A. Bone:

1st Row	Legion of Merit			
2nd Row	Navy Commendation Medal	World War I Victory Medal	Second Nicaraguan Campaign Medal	American Defense Service Medal with Base Clasp
3rd Row	Asiatic-Pacific Campaign Medal with three 3/16 inch service stars	American Campaign Medal	World War II Victory Medal	Philippine Liberation Medal

Military offices
Preceded by Raphael Griffin	Commanding Officer of 10th Marine Regiment; January 1, 1945 - June 6, 1945	Succeeded by Saville T. Clark
