= Expeditionary Medal =

United States military award

An Expeditionary Medal is a United States military award which is awarded to its military personnel for deployment to a foreign region to participate in a campaign or conflict. Expeditionary medals are unique to the United States Armed Forces, but similar medals are commonly known as campaign medals or service medals in foreign militaries. The United States also awards campaign and service medals for service in specific countries or regions while expeditionary medals are frequently awarded for service in regions and nations for which there is no specific service medal, or the specific service medal for that country or region is not approved or currently awarded. Expeditionary medals are considered superior to (ranked above) campaign service medals (in the order of display) and normally ranked below individual commendation decorations.

In the United States armed forces, the following expeditionary medals are maintained:

- Armed Forces Expeditionary Medal
- Navy Expeditionary Medal
- Marine Corps Expeditionary Medal
- Global War on Terrorism Expeditionary Medal
- Merchant Marine Expeditionary Medal

== See also ==
- Awards and decorations of the United States government
- US Military awards and decorations
- Awards and decorations of the United States Army
- Awards and decorations of the United States Navy and Marine Corps
- Awards and decorations of the United States Air Force
- Awards and decorations of the United States Coast Guard
- Inter-service decorations of the United States military
