= Wake Island Device =

US WWII military award

"W" Wake Island Device
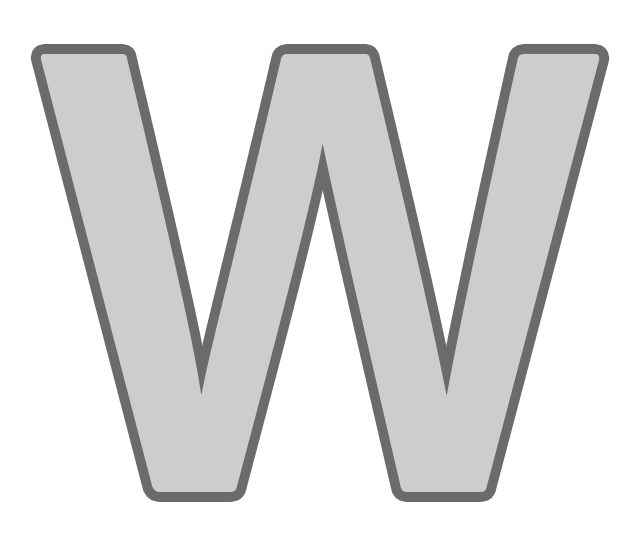
- Wake Island "W" Ribbon Device
- Type: Ribbon Device
- Awarded for: Service on Wake Island (1941)
- Presented by: United States Army
- Status: Not Currently Awarded
- Established: 1941
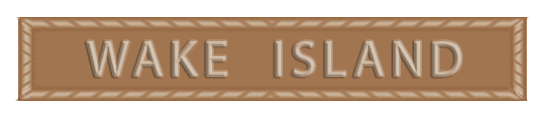
- Wake Island Medal Clasp

The Wake Island Device ("W" Device) is an award device of the United States military which is presented as a campaign clasp to both the Navy and Marine Corps Expeditionary Medals.

The Wake Island Device is authorized for any sailor or Marine who was awarded the Navy or Marine Corps Expeditionary Medal due to service during the defense of Wake Island during the opening days of U.S. involvement in the Second World War. To be awarded the Wake Island Device, a service member must have been awarded either the Navy Expeditionary Medal, or the Marine Corps Expeditionary Medal, and must have served on Wake Island between December 7 and December 22, 1941.

The Wake Island Device is worn as a campaign clasp, inscribed with the words “Wake Island”, centered on the upper portion of the Navy or Marine Corps Expeditionary Medal. When wearing the Expeditionary Medal as a ribbon, the Wake Island Device is annotated by a silver “W” device, centered on the decoration.

A total of only 449 Marine Corps and 68 Navy personnel were eligible for the Wake Island Device, making it one of the rarest of United States military awards. As a point of comparison, there were a total of 472 Medal of Honor recipients during World War II.

Wake Island Ribbon and Medal Devices
Navy Expeditionary Medal	Marine Corps Expeditionary Medal

== See also ==
- Awards and decorations of the United States military
- United States military award devices
