= Navy Expeditionary Medal =

Military award

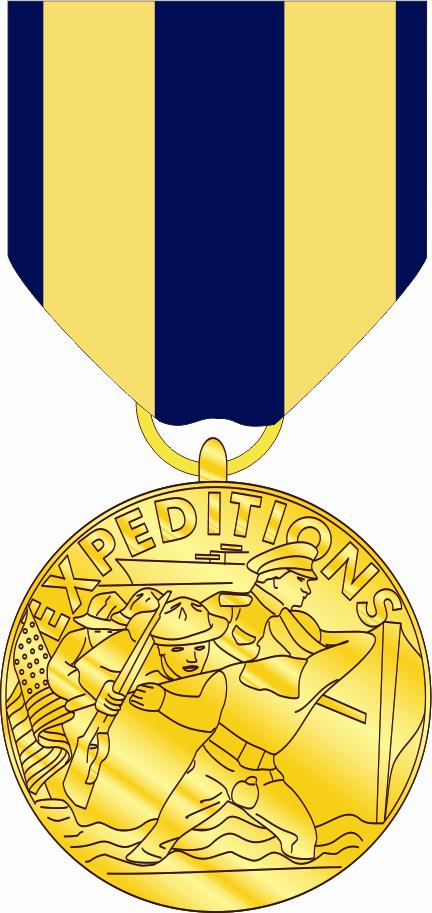
- Obverse
- Type: Military medal Service medal
- Awarded for: Landed on foreign territory and engaged in operations against armed opposition, or operated under circumstances which, after full consideration, shall be deemed to merit special recognition and for which service no campaign medal has been awarded.
- Presented by: the Department of the Navy
- Eligibility: US Navy officers and enlisted
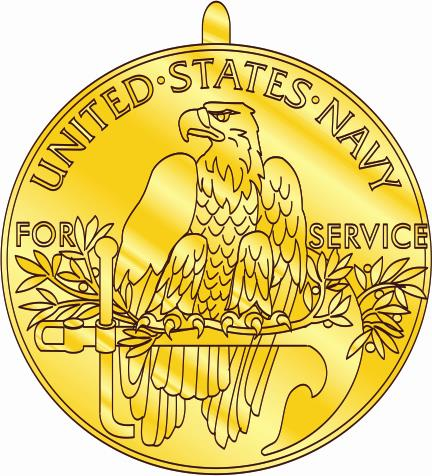
- Reverse
- Clasps: Wake Island
- Status: Currently Awarded
- Established: August 5, 1936
- First award: 12 Feb 1874 (Retroactive) (Honolulu, Hawaiian Islands)
- Final award: 14 Jan 2025
- Service ribbon

Precedence
- Next (higher): U.S. Marine Corps - Selected Marine Corps Reserve Medal; Navy - Good Conduct Medal
- Equivalent: U.S. Marine Corps - Marine Corps Expeditionary Medal
- Next (lower): National Defense Service Medal
- Related: Armed Forces Expeditionary Medal; Air and Space Expeditionary Service Ribbon

The Navy Expeditionary Medal is a military award of the United States Navy which was established in August 1936.

== Award criteria ==
The General Orders of the Department of the Navy which established the medal states, "The medal will be awarded to the officers and enlisted men of the Navy who were confirmed to have landed on foreign territory and engaged in operations against armed opposition, or operated under circumstances which, after full consideration, shall be deemed to merit special recognition and for which no service or campaign medal has been awarded. The Navy Expeditionary Medal is retroactively authorized to February 12, 1874."

== Design ==
The medal was designed by A. A. Weinman and features a sailor beaching a craft carrying Marines, an officer, and a US flag with the word "Expeditions" above. On the reverse of both the Marine Corps Expeditionary Medal and Navy Expeditionary Medal, in the center of the bronze medallion an eagle is shown alight upon an anchor; the eagle is facing to the left and the flukes of the anchor are to the right. The eagle is grasping sprigs of laurel, which extend beyond the anchor in both directions. Above the eagle are the words UNITED STATES MARINE CORPS or UNITED STATES NAVY presented as an arch. Above the laurel are the words FOR SERVICE presented horizontally. The eagle is the American bald eagle and represents the United States, the anchor alludes to Marine Corps or Navy service, and the laurel is symbolic of victory and achievement.

== Marine Corps eligibility ==
The medal is one of the few Navy awards which are not concurrently bestowed to the United States Marine Corps, as Marine Corps personnel are eligible for the Marine Corps Expeditionary Medal as an equivalent award. In addition, since 1961, some Navy commands have permitted service members to choose between the Navy Expeditionary Medal and the Armed Forces Expeditionary Medal for participation in certain operations. Both awards may not be bestowed simultaneously for the same action.

== Additional awards ==
Additional awards of the Navy Expeditionary Medal are denoted by service stars.

== Wake Island Device ==
The Wake Island Device is authorized for those service members who were awarded the Navy Expeditionary Medal through the defense of Wake Island. As the vast majority of the defenders of Wake Island were U.S. Marines, the Navy Expeditionary Medal with the Wake Island device is one of the rarest awards in the U.S. military history, with only 68 eligible recipients.
