= Baltimore County Fire Department =

Operational area
- Country: United States
- State: Maryland
- County: Baltimore County

Agency overview
- Annual calls: 150,066 (2022)
- Staffing: Combination
- Fire chief: Joe Dixon
- EMS level: ALS
- IAFF: 1311

Facilities and equipment
- Stations: 54
- Engines: 74
- Trucks: 10
- Platforms: 2
- Rescues: 6
- Ambulances: 58
- Tenders: 4
- USAR: 1
- Light and air: 3

Website
- Official website
- IAFF website

The Baltimore County Fire Department (B.Co.F.D.) provides fire protection and emergency medical services to the 800,000 residents of Baltimore County, Maryland. The department consists of both county operated and full-time staffed stations and independent volunteer companies located throughout the county.

As of 2019, it had 1,043 members. In 2022, the department responded to 155,066 calls for help, 105,776 of which were EMS related.

== History ==
Sworn in as fire chief on July 1, 2019, Joanne R. Rund became the first female chief to be permanently appointed to the position.

In June 2023 a vote of no confidence was taken, issued by the firefighter's union, criticizing the fire chiefs for poor morale, inconsistent disciplinary procedures, unsafe decisions and falsifying documents.

== Stations and apparatus ==
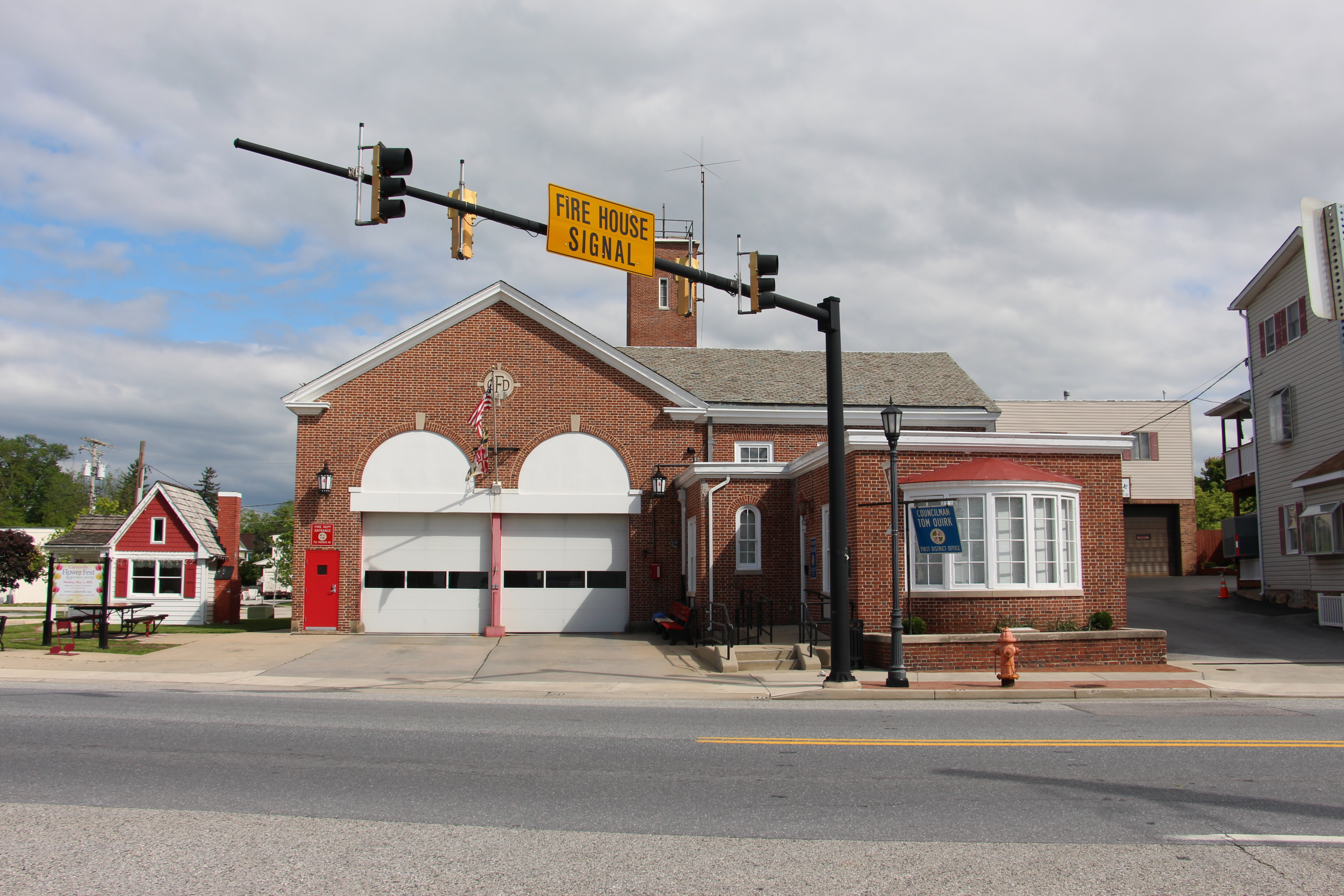
Baltimore County Fire Department Station 4 in Cantonsville, Maryland.

As of 2020, the department is composed of 25 career staffed fire stations. Stations 1,4,6 and 7 have 2 Engines.

Fire Station	Location	Engine Company	Truck Company	EMS units	Other units
1 Towson	Towson	Engine 1 Engine 101	Truck 1	Medic 1 Medic 101	Brush 1
2 Pikesville	Pikesville	Engine 2		Medic 2 Medic 102	Brush 2
3 Woodlawn	Baltimore	Engine 3		Medic 3 Medic 103 EMS 8	Brush 3
4 Catonsville	Catonsville	Engine 4 Engine 41		Medic 4	Brush 4
5 Halethorpe	Baltimore	Engine 5	Truck 5	Medic 5 EMS 2	Brush 5
6 Dundalk	Dundalk	Engine 6 Engine 61		Medic 6 Medic 106	Brush 6
7 Essex	Essex	Engine 7 Engine 71		Medic 7 Medic 107	Brush 7
8 Fullerton	Baltimore	Engine 8	Truck 8	Medic 8 EMS 6	Brush 8
9 Edgemere	Baltimore	Engine 9		Medic 9 Bariatric 9	Brush 9
10 Parkville	Parkville	Engine 10		Medic 10 Medic 110	Brush 10
11 Hillendale	Baltimore	Engine 11		Medic 11 EMS 1	Air Unit 11 ATV 11 Brush 11
12 Middle River	Baltimore	Engine 12		Medic 12 Medic 112 EMS 4	Brush 12
13 Westview	Baltimore	Engine 13	Truck 13	Medic 13 Medic 113	Brush 13 Hazmat Support 13
14 Brooklandville	Lutherville	Engine 14		Medic 14	Brush 14 Hazmat 114 Foam Unit 14
15 Eastview	Baltimore	Engine 15	Truck 15	Medic 15 EMS 3	Brush 15 Hazmat Support 15
16 Golden Ring	Baltimore	Engine 16		Medic 16 Medic 116	Brush 16
17 Texas	Cockeysville	Engine 17	Tower 17	Medic 17 Medic 117 EMS 7	Brush 17 Special Unit 17 USAR 17 ATR 17
18 Randallstown	Randallstown	Engine 18	Truck 18	Medic 18 Medic 118	Brush 18
19 Garrison	Owings Mills	Engine 19		Medic 19 EMS 5	Air Unit 19 Brush 19
54 Chase	Baltimore	Engine 54		Medic 54	Brush 54 Decontamination 54
55 Perry Hall	Perry Hall	Engine 55		Medic 55	Brush 55
56 Franklin	Reisterstown	Engine 56		Medic 56	Brush 56
57 Sparrows Point	Baltimore	Engine 57			Air Unit 57 Brush 57
58 Back River Neck	Baltimore			Medic 58	
60 Parkton	Parkton	Engine 60		Medic 60	Brush 60

== Volunteer companies ==
The department is also supported by 29 volunteer fire companies, which respond to emergencies within their respective jurisdictions. Station 30 has 3 engines while many other stations have 2 engines. Each company is organized as an independent corporation under the Baltimore County Volunteer Firefighter's Association (BCVFA).

Fire Station	Fire Company	Location	Engine Company	Truck Company	EMS units	Other units
-	Box 234 Association, Inc.	Pikesville				Canteen Unit 156 Utility 157
20	White Marsh Volunteer Fire, EMS, Rehab	White Marsh	Engine 201 Engine 202		Medic 203 Medic 204	ATV 20 Brush 207 Utility 205 Utility 206 Rehab 20 Canteen 20
21	Bowleys Quarters Volunteer Fire Department	Middle River	Engine 211			Squad 213 Special Unit 214 Utility 215 Brush 218 Marine Unit 216 Marine Unit 217 Marine Unit 219
26	North Point Edgemere Volunteer Fire Department	Baltimore	Engine 261 Engine 263			Squad 262 Utility 265 Brush 266 Special Unit 267 Boat 268 Boat 269
27	Wise Avenue Volunteer Fire Company	Dundalk	Engine 271 Engine 272		Ambulance 275	Brush 276 Utility 277
28	Rosedale Volunteer Fire Company	Baltimore	Engine 281 Engine 282		Medic 285	Special Unit 283 Utility 287
29	Providence Volunteer Fire Company	Towson	Engine 291	Truck 297		Brush 294 Special Unit 298 Utility 299 ATV 29
30	Lutherville Volunteer Fire Company	Lutherville-Timonium	Engine 301 Engine 302 Engine 307			Squad 303 Utility 204 Special Unit 306
31	Owings Mills Volunteer Fire Company	Owings Mill	Engine 312	Truck 313	Medic 315	Brush 314 Utility 318 Special Unit 319
32	Pikesville Volunteer Fire Company	Pikesville	Engine 321	Tower 323	Medic 325	Squad 322 Utility 329 Confined Space Support Unit 32 (Utility with CS Tech)
33	Woodlawn Volunteer Fire Company	Gwynn Oak	Engine 331		Medic 335	Utility 333
35	Arbutus Volunteer Fire Department	Arbutus	Engine 351 Engine 352		Medic 355 Medic 356	Squad 354 Utility 357 Utility 358 Special Unit 359 Boat 351 Boat 353
36	Lansdowne Volunteer Fire Department	Lansdowne	Engine 361 Engine 362		Medic 365	Special Unit 367 Utility 369
37	English Consul Volunteer Fire Department	Baltimore	Engine 371 Engine 372		Medic 375	Brush 377 Utility 378 Bus 379
38	Long Green Volunteer Fire Company	Glen Arm	Engine 381 Engine 382			Brush 384 Special Unit 387 Utility 386 ATV 38
39	Cockeysville Volunteer Fire Company	Cockeysville	Engine 391 Engine 392		Medic 395	Special Unit 393 Tanker Support 394 Utility 397
40	Glyndon Volunteer Fire Department	Glyndon	Engine 401	Truck 404	Ambulance 405	Utility 408 Special Unit 407
41	Reisterstown Volunteer Fire Company	Reisterstown	Engine 412 Engine 413		Medic 415	Squad 414 Utility 419 Special Unit 418
44	Hereford Volunteer Fire Company	Monkton	Engine 441 Engine 442			Brush 443 Tanker Support 444 Tanker 446 Special Unit 448 Utility 449 ATV 44
45	Maryland Line Volunteer Fire Company	Maryland Line	Engine 451 Engine 452		Medic 455	Tanker 454 Utility 457
46	Liberty Road Volunteer Fire Company	Randallstown	Engine 461		Medic 465	Brush 462 Utility 463 Special Unit 468
47	Jacksonville Volunteer Fire Company	Phoenix	Engine 471 Engine 473		Medic 475	Special Unit 476 Brush 472 Utility 477 ATV 47
48	Kingsville Volunteer Fire Company	Kingsville	Engine 481		Medic 485	Squad 483 Tanker 488 Special Unit 486 Utility 487 ATV 48 Boat 48
49	Butler Volunteer Fire Company	Butler	Engine 494			Brush 492 Tanker Support 491 Utility 497
50	Chestnut Ridge Volunteer Fire Company	Owings Mills	Engine 501 Engine/Tanker 503		Medic 505 Medical Support Unit 507	Brush 506 Tanker Support Unit 504 Utility 502 Special Operations Response Team 50 ATV 50
51	Essex Volunteer Fire Company	Essex	Engine 511 Engine 512		Medic 515	Special Unit 513 Brush 514 Utility 516
53	Monkton Volunteer Emergency Medical Services (formally known as Herford Volunteer Ambulance Association)	Monkton			Medic 535 Medic 536	Special Unit 532 ATV 53
74	Middle River Volunteer Fire and Rescue Co.	Middle River	Engine 742	Truck 741	Medic 746	Squad 743 Utility 747 Utility 749 Dive Unit 748
85	Upperco Volunteer Fire Company	Upperco	Engine 851 Engine 852		Medic 855	Utility 857 Utility 859 Brush 858 ATV 85
