= USS Regulus (AK-14) =

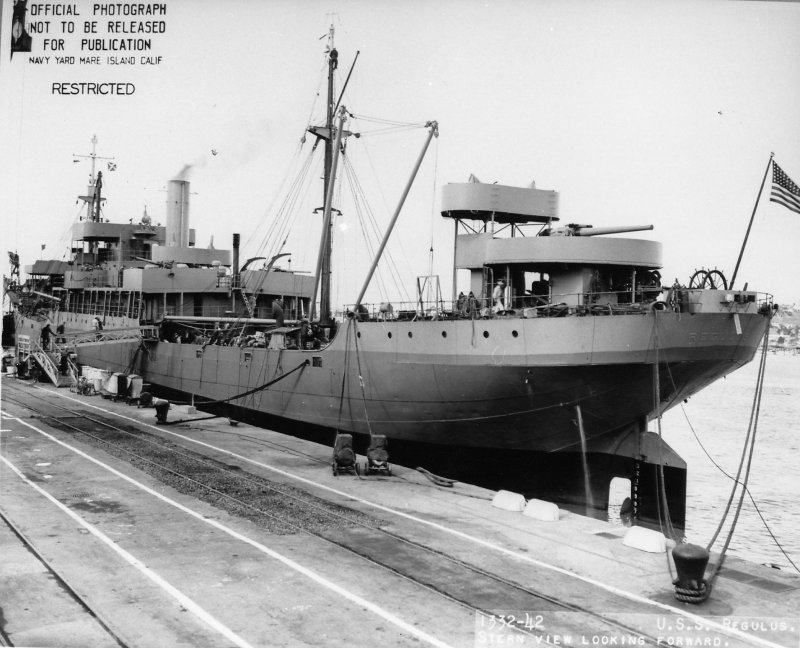
- Stern view of USS Regulus (AK-14) at Mare Island, 13 March 1942. Regulus was under repairs at Mare Island from 17 January to 20 March 1942. Note the exposed after steering station on her stern.

History

United States
- Name: Glenora; Regulus
- Namesake: Regulus
- Launched: 14 August 1920
- Acquired: 7 November 1921
- Commissioned: 14 December 1940
- Decommissioned: 25 March 1946
- Stricken: 17 April 1946
- Home port: Pearl Harbor (1941-1945)
- Identification: Hull symbol: AK-14
- Fate: Sold for scrapping, 10 September 1947

General characteristics
- Class & type: Regulus-class cargo ship
- Displacement: 3,590 t (3,530 long tons) (standard); 10,480 t (10,310 long tons) (full load)
- Length: 491 ft 9 in (149.89 m)
- Beam: 52 ft 2 in (15.90 m)
- Draft: 24 ft (7.3 m)
- Installed power: 2,500 shp (1,900 kW)
- Propulsion: 1 × Bethlehem Shipbuilding vertical triple-expansion steam engine; 3 × Scotch boilers, 200psi Sat°; 1 × shaft
- Speed: 11.5 kn (13.2 mph; 21.3 km/h)
- Capacity: 4,900 DWT
- Complement: 21 officers 199 enlisted
- Armament: 1 × 5 in (130 mm)/38 caliber dual purpose gun; 4 × 3 in (76 mm)/50 caliber dual purpose guns

USS Regulus (AK-14) was a cargo ship acquired by the U.S. Navy for service in World War II. She was responsible for delivering necessary goods and equipment to ships and stations in the war zone.

== Construction ==
The first ship named Regulus by the Navy, she was built as SS Glenora in 1920, by the Bethlehem Steel Wilmington (aka Harlan and Hollingsworth), Wilmington, Delaware, was acquired by the Navy from the War Shipping Board 7 November 1921. In reserve for almost two decades, she was commissioned in ordinary 8 August 1940.

== World War II Pacific Theatre operations ==
Commissioned in full at New York City 14 December 1940, Regulus steamed via the U.S. West Coast to Pearl Harbor, her homeport from February 1941 through the end of World War II. Assigned to the 14th Naval District, she carried supplies to Wake Island and Midway Island until the Japanese attack on Pearl Harbor. At Midway on 7 December 1941, Regulus returned to Pearl Harbor on the 14th, then sailed to the West Coast, whence, through May, she carried cargo to Hawaii. After the Battle of Midway in early June, she resumed resupply runs to that island and continued them until September 1943. Assigned then to ServRon 8, she operated among the Samoan and Ellice Islands until she resumed west coast-Hawaii cargo runs in April 1944.

== Supplying the troops in the South Pacific ==
After the invasion of the Philippines, Regulus again carried cargo westward. On 21 November, she arrived at Eniwetok, whence she continued on to Ulithi. Arriving 30 November, she moved on to Manus in mid-January 1945 and returned to the Carolines at the end of the month. Remaining at Ulithi into May, she sailed for the Philippines on the 20th. She anchored off Leyte on the 25th and 2 weeks later got underway for Okinawa, where she conducted cargo operations for the remainder of the war and into the fall of 1945.

== End-of-war operations ==
On 26 November she sailed east, arriving at San Francisco, California, and reporting for inactivation 8 January 1946. Decommissioned 25 March, she was struck from the Navy list 17 April; transferred to the Maritime Commission 1 July; and sold for scrap to the Kaiser Co., on 29 September 1947.
