= Medal bar =

Thin metal bar attached to the ribbon of a medal as an additional award

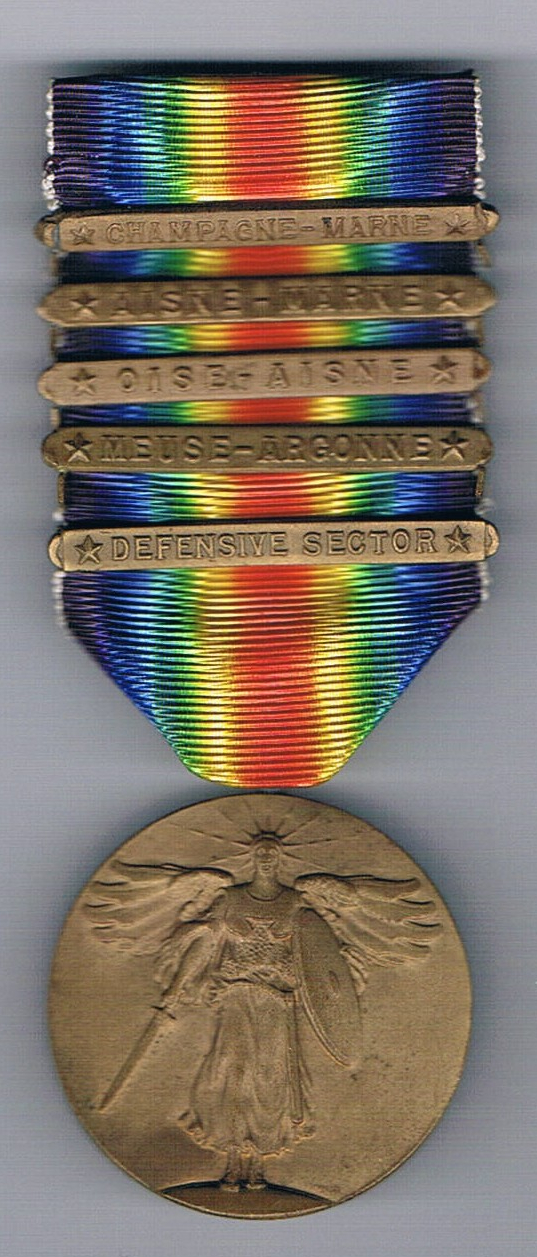
A United States World War I Victory Medal, with five medal bars

A medal bar or medal clasp is a thin metal bar attached to the ribbon of a military decoration, civil decoration, or other medal. It most commonly indicates the campaign or operation the recipient received the award for, and multiple bars on the same medal are used to indicate that the recipient has met the criteria for receiving the medal in multiple theatres.

When used in conjunction with decorations for exceptional service, such as gallantry medals, the term "and bar" means that the award has been bestowed multiple times. In the example, "Group Captain Leonard Cheshire, VC, OM, DSO and two bars, DFC", "DSO and two bars" means that the Distinguished Service Order was awarded on three occasions. A British convention is to indicate bars by the use of asterisks; thus, DSO** would denote a DSO and two bars.

Bars are also used on long-service medals to indicate the length of service rendered.

The two terms are used because "bar" and "clasp" refer to two parts of the medal: the indicator discussed in this article, and the part of the medal connected to the ribbon.

== History ==
Prior to the early 19th century, medals and decorations were only awarded to ranking officers; occasions existed where medals were presented to soldiers (other ranks or enlisted men) or seamen (naval ratings), but these were often private efforts. One exception was the Army Gold Medal issued to higher ranking participants in the Peninsular War. A medal was given for service, with a clasp for each battle fought. After four clasps were earned the medal was turned in for a cross with the battle names on the arms, and additional clasps were then added. The maximum was achieved by the Duke of Wellington, with a cross and nine clasps.

Over the next 40 years, it became customary for governments to present a medal to all soldiers and officers involved in a campaign. These medals were often engraved with the names of the major battles the recipient had fought in during the campaign. The main disadvantages of this system were that new medals had to be created for each campaign or war, and that it was impossible to tell at a glance if the recipient was only a participant in the campaign overall, or if he had been involved in one or several major actions. (The first gallantry medal to be awarded to ordinary British soldiers was the Victoria Cross in 1856.)

The Sutlej Medal was the earliest medal to use such bars. It was awarded to British Army and Honourable East India Company soldiers who fought in the First Anglo-Sikh War between 1845 and 1846. The first battle the recipient participated in would be engraved on the medal itself. If the recipient had participated in multiple engagements, silver bars bearing the name of each additional battle were attached to the medal's ribbon. This method of notation evolved again on the Punjab Campaign medal, where the standard medal was awarded to all that had served during the campaign, with bars produced for the three major battles; the Battle of Chillianwala, the Siege of Multan, and the Battle of Gujarat.

The creation of bars led to the development of 'General Service' medals, which would be presented to any soldier serving in a general region or time frame. Bars would be awarded to denote the particular campaign or war the recipient fought in. The 1854 India General Service Medal was awarded to soldiers over a 41-year period. Twenty-three clasps were created for this award, becoming one of the more extreme uses of this system. The British Naval General Service Medal, was authorised in 1847 with some 231 clasps (of which about 10 were never issued) for actions ranging from relatively minor skirmishes to certain campaigns and all full-fledged battles between 1793 and 1840.

The Crimea Medal was issued with ornate battle bars. Since then the general trend has been to have simple horizontal devices.

== Types of bar ==
Illustration of the three versions of the Wintered Over Device from the United States Antarctica Service Medal

- Campaign bars or battle bars are used to denote the particular campaign, battle, or region the recipient operated in to receive the award. This is the most common use of medal bars on military decorations. In the United Kingdom, campaign bars are usually known as clasps and when the ribbon alone is worn they are sometimes indicated by rosettes, although this is not commonly authorised. Examples of ones that were issued are the "under enemy fire" clasp on the 1914 Star and the Battle of Britain clasp on the 1939-45 Star. In the United States Military, Service stars are used to indicate participation in multiple battles or campaigns, although the World War I Victory Medal had an extensive system of bars. Starting with World War II the Arrowhead device was authorized for assault landings. Also in this conflict a unique variation of the Service star was the Wake Island Device, a "W" placed on the ribbons of the Navy and Marine Corps Expeditionary Medals. This was issued to represent the medal bar for fighting in the Battle of Wake Island.
- Achievement bars are used to indicate a particular or additional feat associated with the medal. As an example, the Wintered Over Device attached to the United States Antarctica Service Medal indicates that the recipient performed a tour of duty during the Antarctic winter.
- Service bars indicate the length of service a person has provided to the organisation presenting the award. This type of bar is most commonly found on long service medals for the military and emergency services.
- Multiple award bars display the number of times a decoration for merit or distinguished service has been awarded. In the United States, Oak Leaf Clusters (Army and Air Force) and Stars (Navy and Marine Corps), rather than bars, are issued for receiving the same award multiple times. In the United Kingdom, each bar is indicated by a rosette when the ribbon alone is worn (or, in the case of the Victoria Cross or George Cross, by an additional miniature model of the cross itself, since one of these is always worn on the ribbon of these two awards).

== See also ==
- United States military award devices
