= Marine Corps Expeditionary Medal =

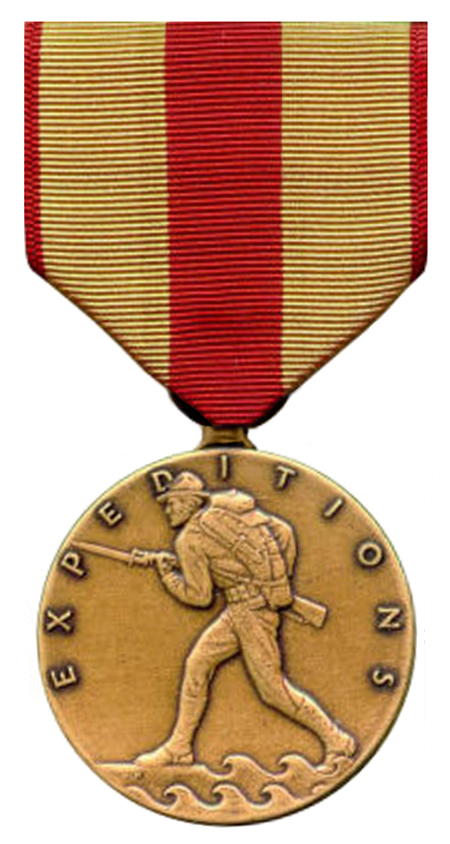
- Obverse
- Type: Military medal Service medal
- Awarded for: Land on foreign territory, engage in operations against armed opposition, or who operate under circumstances deemed to merit special recognition and for which no campaign medal has been awarded.
- Presented by: The Department of the Navy
- Eligibility: Officers and enlisted members of the US Marine Corps
- Clasps: Wake Island
- Status: Currently Awarded
- Established: 8 May 1919
- First award: Panama 1873 (retroactive)
- Service ribbon and streamer

Precedence
- Next (higher): Marine Corps Selected Marine Corps Reserve Medal; Navy – Fleet Marine Force Ribbon
- Equivalent: Navy – Navy Expeditionary Medal
- Next (lower): China Service Medal
- Related: Armed Forces Expeditionary Medal; Air and Space Expeditionary Service Ribbon

The Marine Corps Expeditionary Medal is a military award of the United States Marine Corps. It was established on 8 May 1919 as the Marine Corps Expeditionary Ribbon. A full-sized medal was authorized on 1 March 1921. The Marine Corps Expeditionary Medal is therefore one of the oldest medals of the United States military which is still issued to active duty personnel.

== Award criteria ==
To be awarded the Marine Corps Expeditionary Medal, a Marine must have engaged in a landing on foreign territory, participated in combat operations against an opposing force, or participated in a designated operation for which no other service medal is authorized. After 1961, some commands permitted eligible personnel to choose between the Marine Corps Expeditionary Medal, or the Armed Forces Expeditionary Medal, depending on the nature of the operation in question.

== Design ==
In 1919, the Corps established the Expeditionary Ribbon to recognize "limited service against an opposing force." Two years later, in 1921, the ribbon became the Marine Corps Expeditionary Medal (MCEM). The medal was designed by Walker Hancock and features a 1920s-era Marine in full combat gear, advancing with one foot in the water and one foot on land, bayonet at the ready, with the word "Expeditions". On the reverse of both the Marine Corps Expeditionary Medal and Navy Expeditionary Medal, in the center of the bronze medallion an eagle is shown alight upon an anchor; the eagle is facing to the left and the flukes of the anchor are to the right. The eagle is grasping sprigs of laurel, which extend beyond the anchor in both directions. Above the eagle are the words UNITED STATES MARINE CORPS or UNITED STATES NAVY presented as an arch. Above the laurel are the words FOR SERVICE presented horizontally. The eagle is the American bald eagle and represents the United States, the anchor alludes to Marine Corps or Navy service, and the laurel is symbolic of victory and achievement.

Subsequent awards of the Marine Corps Expeditionary Medal were originally denoted by award numerals. After 1921, multiple awards were denoted by bronze service stars. The Fleet Marine Force Combat Operation Insignia is also authorized for navy personnel who were on duty with and attached to a Marine Corps unit that participated in combat. The Wake Island Device is authorized for any personnel who were awarded the Marine Corps Expeditionary Medal as part of the defense of Wake Island during the opening days of World War II.

== See also ==
- Awards and decorations of the United States military
