= Admiral Cunningham (disambiguation) =

Andrew Cunningham, 1st Viscount Cunningham of Hyndhope (1883–1963) was a Royal Navy Admiral of the Fleet.

Admiral Cunningham may also refer to:

- Charles Cunningham (1755–1834), British Royal Navy rear admiral
- John Cunningham (Royal Navy officer) (1885–1962), British Royal Navy admiral
- Winfield S. Cunningham (1900–1986), U.S. navy rear admiral
