= General Putnam (disambiguation) =

Israel Putnam (1718–1790) was a Continental Army major general. General Putnam may also refer to:

- Paul A. Putnam (1903–1982), U.S. Marine Corps brigadier general
- Rufus Putnam (1738–1824), Continental Army brigadier general
