= Henry T. Elrod =

US Marine Corps aviator and Medal of Honor recipient (1905–1941)

Henry Talmage Elrod
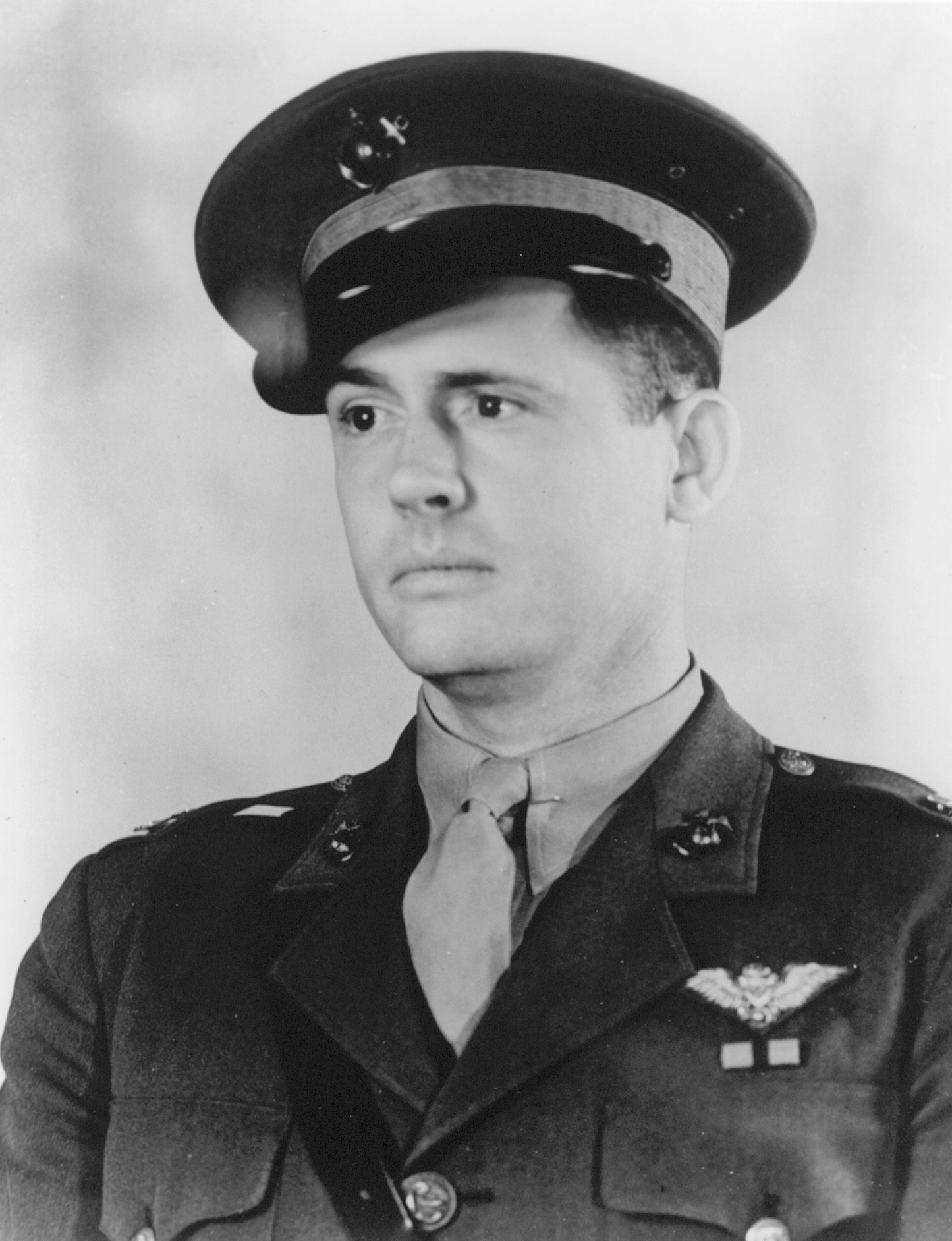
- Henry T. Elrod
- Born: September 27, 1905; Turner County, Georgia, US
- Died: December 23, 1941 (aged 36); Wake Island
- Burial place: Arlington National Cemetery, Arlington, Virginia
- Military career
- Allegiance: United States
- Branch: United States Marine Corps
- Service years: 1927–1941
- Rank: Major (posthumous)
- Nickname: "Hammering Hank"
- Unit: VMF-211
- Commands: Executive Officer
- Conflicts: World War II; Battle of Wake Island †
- Awards: Medal of Honor; Purple Heart; Marine Corps Expeditionary Medal with Wake Island Device

Henry Talmage "Hammerin' Hank" Elrod (September 27, 1905 – December 23, 1941) was a US Marine Corps aviator. He was the first aviator to receive the Medal of Honor during World War II, for his heroism in the defense of Wake Island.

== Marine Corps service ==
Elrod was born on September 27, 1905, in Turner County, Georgia. He enlisted in the Marine Corps in December 1927, and was appointed a Marine second lieutenant in February 1931. He attended the University of Georgia and Yale University prior to his entry into the Marine Corps.

Following over a year at the Marine Corps Basic School in Philadelphia as a student aviator, Lieutenant Elrod was ordered to the Naval Air Station Pensacola, Florida. There he served as a company officer and as student aviator. In February 1935, he earned his wings and was transferred to Marine Corps Base Quantico, where he served as a Marine Aviator until January 1938. In addition to his other duties, he was his squadron's school, personnel, and welfare officer.

In July 1938, Elrod was ordered to a squadron in San Diego and served as their material, parachute, and personnel officer until January 1941, when he was detached to the Hawaiian area.

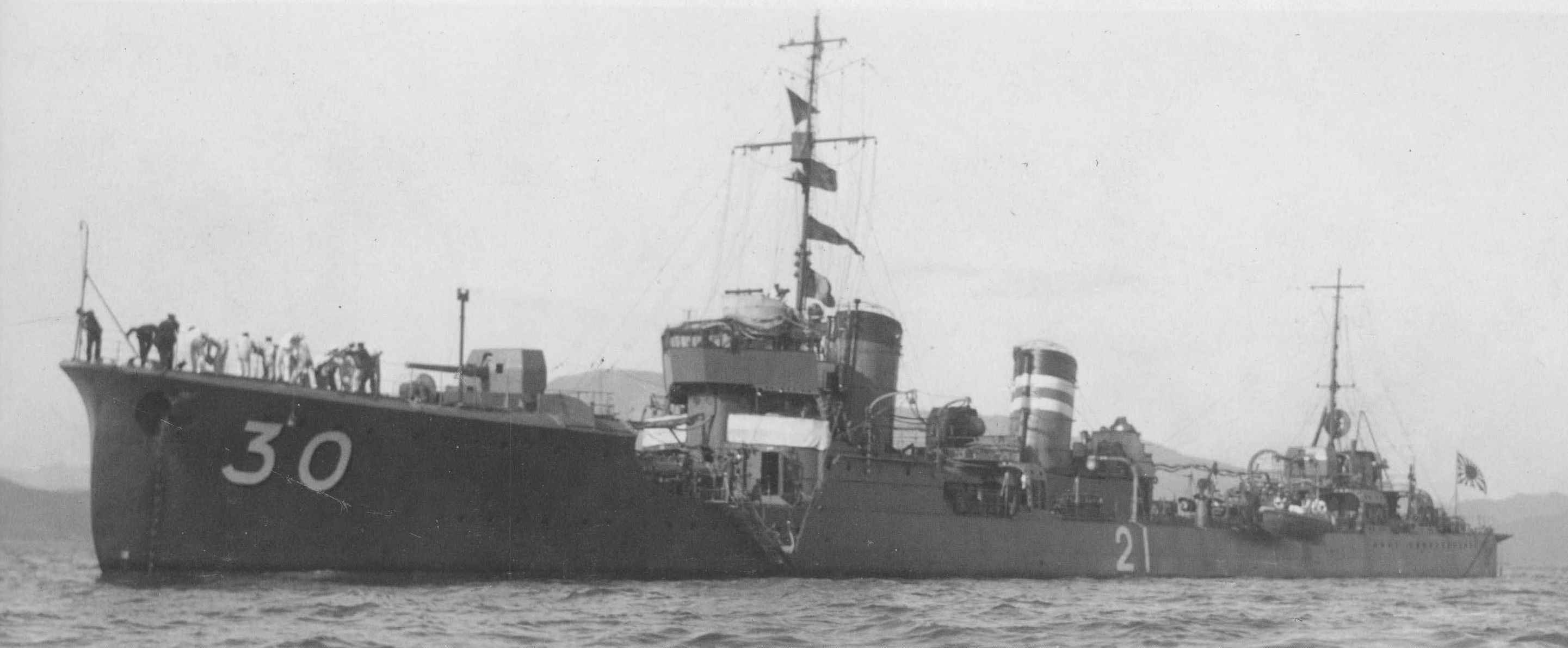
The Japanese destroyer Kisaragi

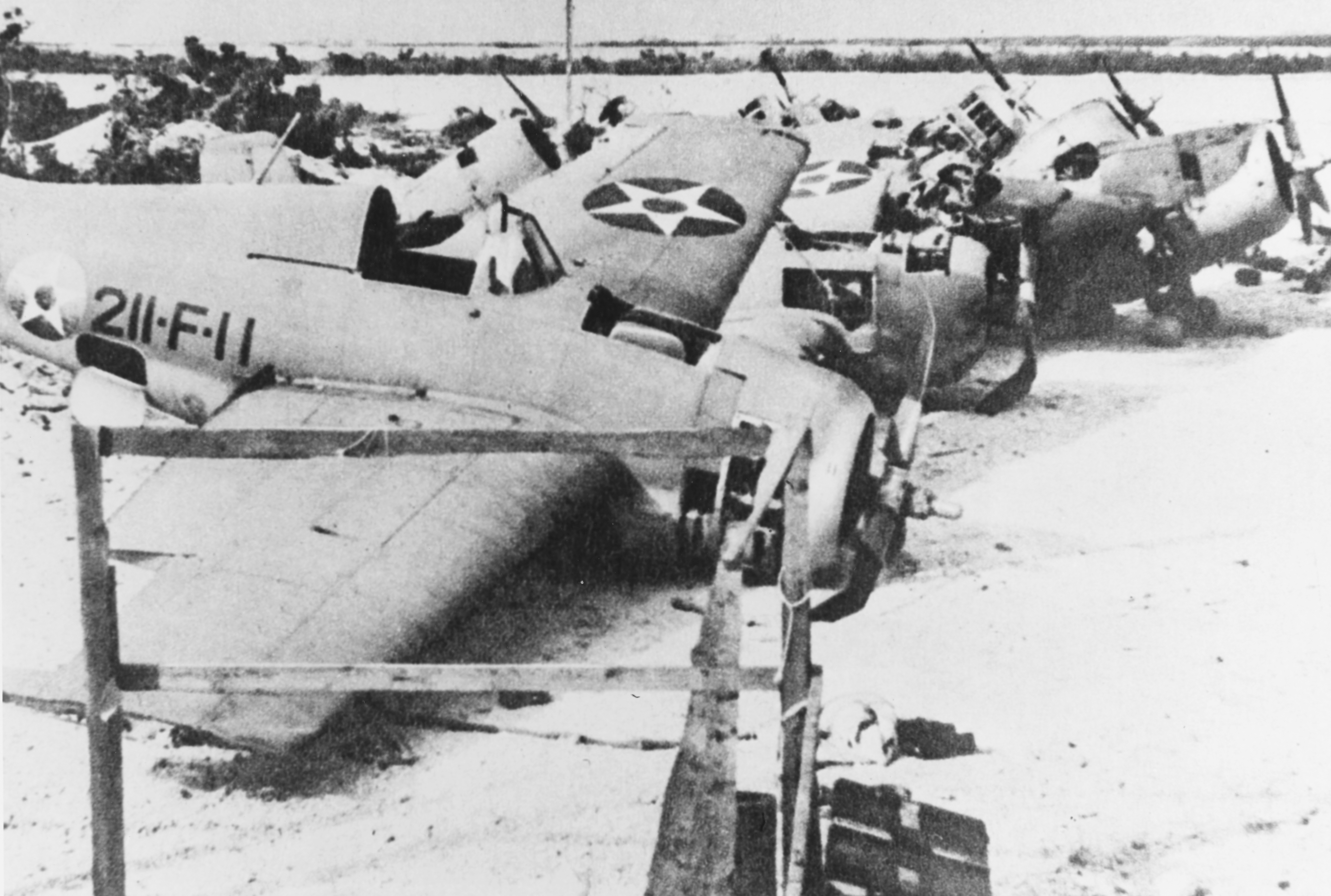
Wreckage of Wildcat 211-F-11, flown by Capt Elrod on December 11, in the attack that sank the Japanese destroyer Kisaragi

On December 4, 1941, Captain Elrod flew to Wake Island with twelve aircraft, twelve pilots, and the ground crew of Major Paul A. Putnam's fighter squadron, VMF-211. Hostilities in the air over Wake Island commenced on December 8, 1941. On December 12, he single-handedly attacked a flight of 22 enemy planes and shot down two. He executed several low-altitude bombing and strafing runs on enemy ships; during one of these attacks, he became the first man to sink a warship, the Japanese destroyer Kisaragi, with small-caliber bombs delivered from a Wildcat fighter aircraft, dropping the bombs onto the destroyer's stern, causing the depth charges to explode.

When all the U.S. aircraft had been destroyed by Japanese fire, he organized remaining troops into a beach defense unit which repulsed repeated Japanese attacks. On December 23, 1941, Captain Elrod was mortally wounded while protecting his men who were carrying ammunition to a gun emplacement.

He was posthumously promoted to major on November 8, 1946, and his widow was presented with the Medal of Honor for his heroic actions during the defense of Wake Island. His widow, the former Elizabeth Hogun Jackson, was the niece of Admiral Richard H. Jackson and served as a commissioned officer in the United States Marine Corps.

Major Elrod was initially buried on Wake Island, but was reinterred in Arlington National Cemetery in October 1947.

== Posthumous honors ==
The main road leading in to the Marine Corps Officer Candidate School is named after Elrod.

The City of Ashburn, Georgia (the county seat of Turner County) dedicated a park to Elrod in 2010.

The U.S. Navy Oliver Hazard Perry-class frigate, USS Elrod (FFG-55), is named in his honor. In 1995 Elrod was inducted into the Georgia Aviation Hall of Fame.

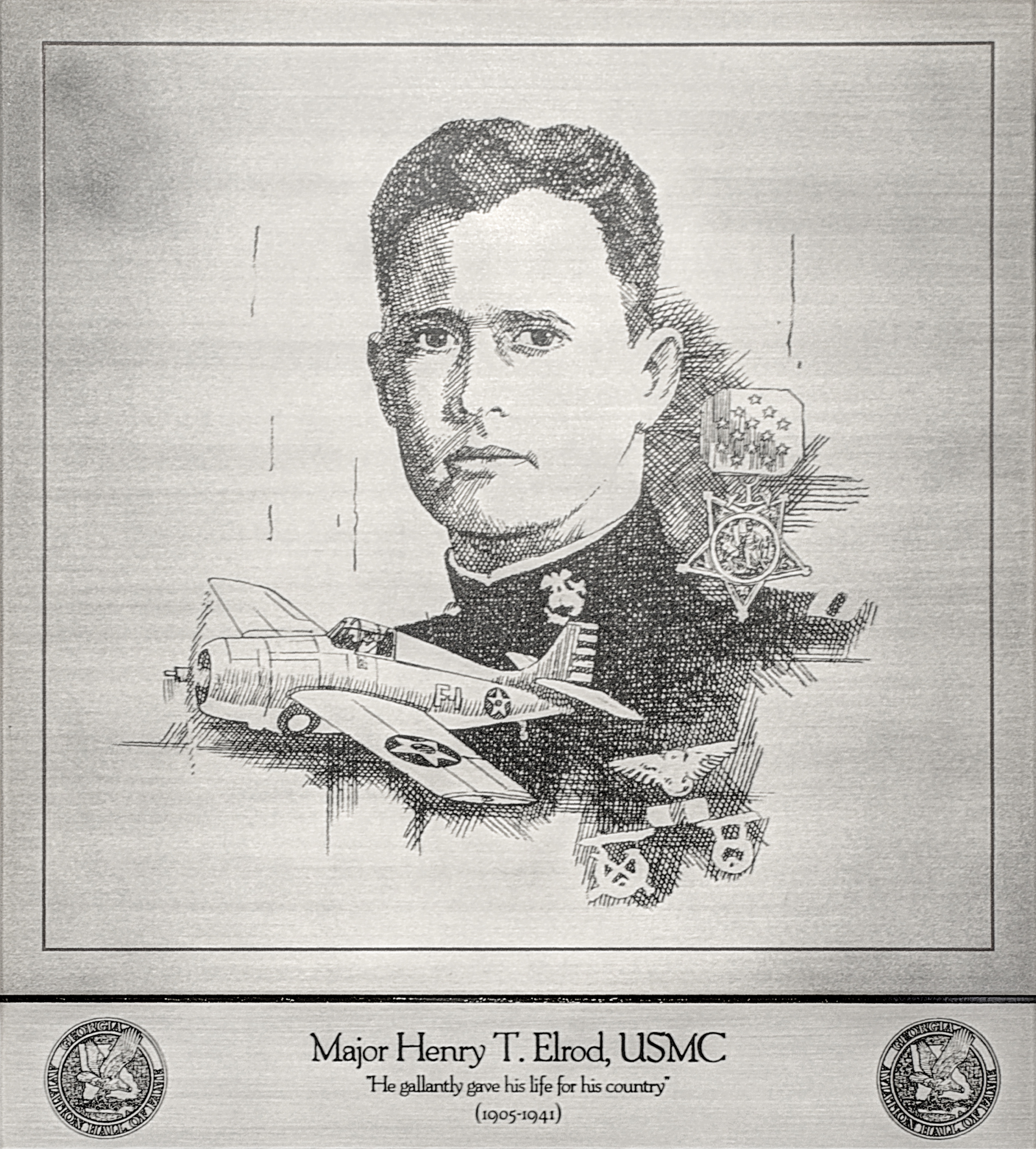
Plaque of Major Elrod at the Georgia Aviation Hall of Fame

== Awards ==

Naval Aviator Badge
Medal of Honor		Purple Heart
Navy Presidential Unit Citation	Marine Corps Expeditionary Medal with "Wake Island" clasp	American Defense Service Medal with "Base" clasp
American Campaign Medal	Asiatic-Pacific Campaign Medal with one battle star	World War II Victory Medal

All his awards, except for the American Defense Service Medal and a previous award of the Marine Corps Expeditionary Medal, were given posthumously.

=== Medal of Honor citation ===
The President of the United States takes pride in presenting the MEDAL OF HONOR posthumously to

CAPTAIN HENRY T. ELROD
UNITED STATES MARINE CORPS

for service as set forth in the following CITATION:

For conspicuous gallantry and intrepidity at the risk of his life above and beyond the call of duty while attached to Marine Fighting Squadron TWO HUNDRED ELEVEN, during action against enemy Japanese land, surface and aerial units at Wake Island, from 8 to 23 December 1941. Engaging vastly superior forces of enemy bombers and warships on 9 and 12 December, Captain Elrod shot down two of a flight of twenty-two hostile planes and, executing repeated bombing and strafing runs at extremely low altitude and close range, succeeded in inflicting deadly damage upon a large Japanese vessel, thereby sinking the first major warship to be destroyed by small caliber bombs delivered from a fighter-type aircraft. When his plane was disabled by hostile fire and no other ships were operative, Captain Elrod assumed command of one flank of the line set up in defiance of the enemy landing and conducting a brilliant defense, enabled his men to hold their positions and repulse determined Japanese attacks, repeatedly proceeding through intense hostile fusillades to provide covering fire for unarmed ammunition carriers. Capturing an automatic weapon during one enemy rush in force, he gave his own firearm to one of his men and fought on vigorously against the Japanese. Responsible in a large measure of the strength of his sector's gallant resistance, on 23 December, Captain Elrod led his men with bold aggressiveness until he fell, mortally wounded. His superb skill as a pilot, daring leadership and unswerving devotion to duty distinguished him among the defenders of Wake Island, and his valiant conduct reflects the highest credit upon himself and the United States Naval Service. He gallantly gave his life for his country.

== See also ==
- List of Medal of Honor recipients
- List of Medal of Honor recipients for World War II
