= Japanese destroyer Kisaragi (1925) =

Mutsuki-class destroyer

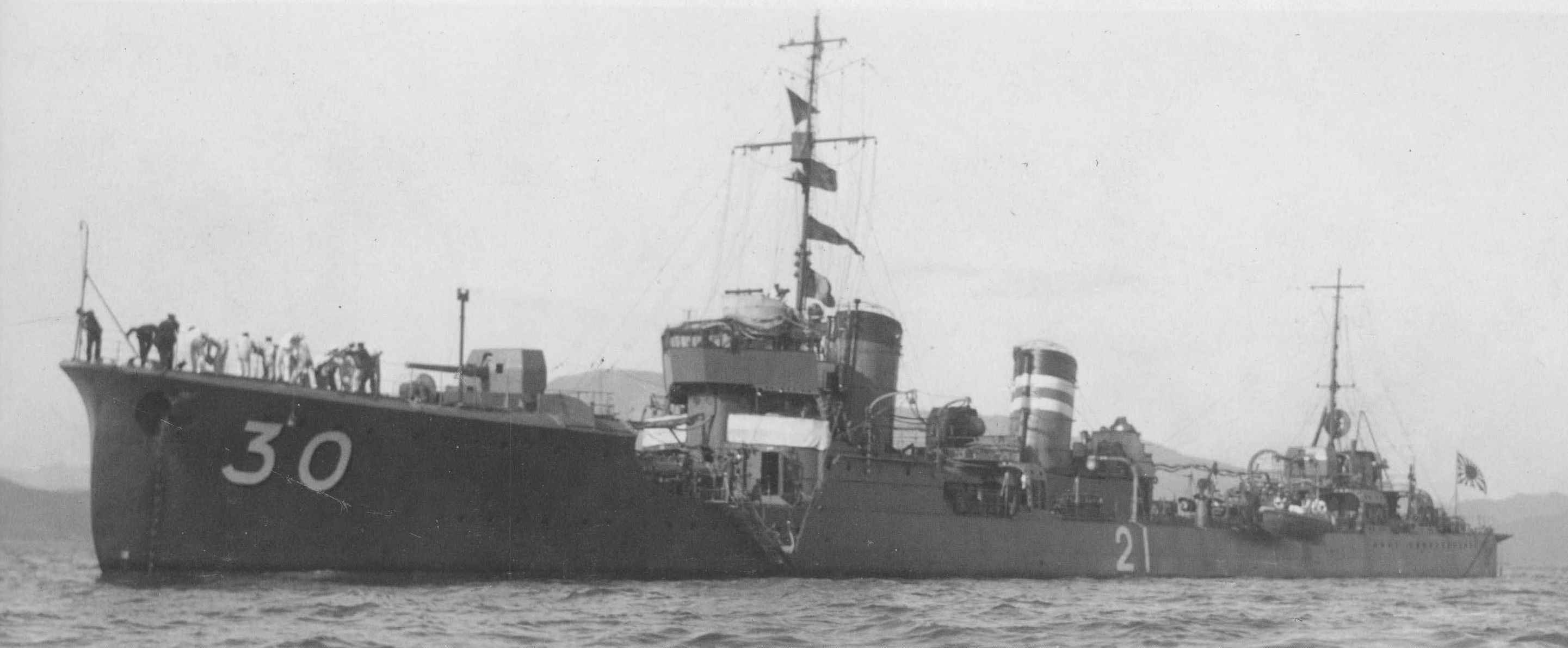
- Kisaragi at anchor, February 1927

History

Empire of Japan
- Name: Kisaragi
- Namesake: February
- Builder: Maizuru Naval Arsenal
- Laid down: 3 June 1924 as Destroyer No. 21
- Launched: 5 June 1925
- Completed: 21 December 1925
- Renamed: As Kisaragi, 1 August 1928
- Stricken: 15 January 1942
- Fate: Sunk, 11 December 1941

General characteristics
- Class & type: Mutsuki-class destroyer
- Displacement: 1,336 t (1,315 long tons) (normal); 1,800 t (1,772 long tons) (deep load)
- Length: 97.54 m (320 ft 0 in) (pp); 102.4 m (335 ft 11 in) (o/a)
- Beam: 9.16 m (30 ft 1 in)
- Draft: 2.96 m (9 ft 9 in)
- Installed power: 38,500 shp (28,700 kW); 4 × Kampon water-tube boilers
- Propulsion: 2 shafts; 2 × Kampon geared steam turbines
- Speed: 37.25 knots (68.99 km/h; 42.87 mph)
- Range: 4,000 nmi (7,400 km; 4,600 mi) at 15 knots (28 km/h; 17 mph)
- Complement: 150
- Armament: 4 × 12 cm (4.7 in) Type 3 guns; 2 × triple 61 cm (24 in) torpedo tubes; 18 × depth charges; 16 × mines

Service record
- Part of: Destroyer Division 30
- Operations: Battle of Wake Island

Kisaragi (如月, "February") was one of twelve Mutsuki-class destroyers, built for the Imperial Japanese Navy (IJN) during the 1920s. Retreating after the sinking of destroyer Hayate by American coast-defense guns during the Battle of Wake Island in December 1941, Kisaragi was sunk with all hands by American aircraft. She had the distinction of being the second major Japanese warship lost during the war (after Hayate earlier the same day). She should not be confused with an earlier World War I-period Kamikaze-class destroyer with the same name.

== Design and description ==
The Mutsuki class was an improved version of the Kamikaze-class destroyers and was the first with triple 61-centimeter (24 in) torpedo tubes. The ships had an overall length of 102.4 meters (335 ft 11 in) and were 94.54 meters (310 ft 2 in) between perpendiculars. They had a beam of 9.16 meters (30 ft 1 in), and a mean draft of 2.96 meters (9 ft 9 in). The Mutsuki-class ships displaced 1,336 metric tons (1,315 long tons) at standard load and 1,800 metric tons (1,772 long tons) at deep load. They were powered by two Parsons geared steam turbines, each driving one propeller shaft, using steam provided by four Kampon water-tube boilers. The turbines were designed to produce 38,500 shaft horsepower (28,700 kW), which would propel the ships at 37.25 knots (68.99 km/h; 42.87 mph). The ships carried 420 metric tons (413 long tons) of fuel oil which gave them a range of 4,000 nautical miles (7,400 km; 4,600 mi) at 15 knots (28 km/h; 17 mph). Their crew consisted of 150 officers and crewmen.

The main armament of the Mutsuki-class ships consisted of four 12-centimeter (4.7 in) Type 3 guns in single mounts; one gun forward of the superstructure, one between the two funnels and the last pair back to back atop the aft superstructure. The guns were numbered '1' to '4' from front to rear. The ships carried two above-water triple sets of 61-centimeter torpedo tubes; one mount was between the forward superstructure and the forward gun and the other was between the aft funnel and aft superstructure. Four reload torpedoes were provided for the tubes. They carried 18 depth charges and could also carry 16 mines. They could also fitted with minesweeping gear.

== Construction and career ==
Kisaragi was laid down at the Maizuru Naval Arsenal on 3 June 1922, launched on 5 June 1925 and completed on 21 December 1925. Originally commissioned simply as Destroyer No. 21, the vessel was assigned the name Kisaragi on 1 August 1928.

=== WWII ===
At the time of the attack on Pearl Harbor on 7 December 1941, Kisaragi was assigned to Destroyer Division 30 under Destroyer Squadron 6 of the 4th Fleet. She sortied from Kwajalein on 8 December as part of the Wake Island invasion force. This consisted of the light cruisers Yūbari, Tenryū, and Tatsuta, the destroyers Yayoi, Hayate, Mutsuki, Kisaragi, Oite, and Mochizuki, two old Momi-class vessels converted to patrol boats (Patrol Boat No. 32 and Patrol Boat No. 33), and two troop transports containing 450 Japanese Special Naval Landing Forces (SNLF) troops.

The Japanese approached the island early on the morning of 11 December, and the warships began to bombard the island at a range of 8,200 meters (9,000 yd) at 05:30. As none of the six American 5-inch (12.7 cm) coast-defense guns replied, Rear Admiral Sadamichi Kajioka, commander of the invasion forces, ordered his ships to close the island, believing that the American guns had been destroyed by the earlier aerial attacks. Encouraging this, Major James Devereux, commander of the United States Marine garrison, had ordered his men to hold their fire until he gave the order to do so. After the Japanese ships had closed to a range of 4,100 meters (4,500 yd), he ordered his guns to open fire. They did so with great effect, sinking Hayate, near-missing Kajioka's flagship Yubari, and causing to him to order his forces to disengage.

Kisaragi was sailing away from the island when she was attacked and sunk by Grumman F4F Wildcat fighters of Marine Fighter Squadron VMF-211 that had taken off earlier armed with 100-pound (45 kg) bombs. What happened next is unclear as sources disagree: older American accounts attribute her loss to a bomb dropped by Captain Henry Elrod that landed amongst her depth charges on Kisaragi's stern, which detonated and sank the destroyer; a more recent account says that Elrod dropped a bomb that penetrated belowdecks and started a fire and that she blew up later just as another pilot was preparing to attack. Japanese accounts say that one bomb demolished the ship's bridge and that she blew up five minutes later, with the blast originating from amidships. She sank with the loss of all 157 crewmembers about 30 miles (48 km) southwest of Wake Island at coordinates 18°55′N 166°17′E, the second major Japanese warship to be sunk during the war (after Hayate). Kisaragi was struck from the Navy List on 15 January 1942. The sinking of Kisaragi would contribute to Elrod being posthumously awarded the Medal of Honor.

== Sources ==
- Chesneau, Roger, ed. (1980). Conway's All the World's Fighting Ships 1922–1946. Greenwich: Conway Maritime Press. ISBN 0-85177-146-7.
- Howarth, Stephen (1983). The Fighting Ships of the Rising Sun: The Drama of the Imperial Japanese Navy, 1895–1945. Atheneum. ISBN 0-689-11402-8.
- Jentschura, Hansgeorg; Jung, Dieter & Mickel, Peter (1977). Warships of the Imperial Japanese Navy, 1869–1945. Annapolis, Maryland: United States Naval Institute. ISBN 0-87021-893-X.
- Nevitt, Allyn D.; Tully, Anthony D. (July 2014). "IJN Kisaragi: Tabular Record of Movement". Long Lancers. Combinedfleet.com.
- Watts, Anthony J. & Gordon, Brian G. (1971). The Imperial Japanese Navy. Garden City, New York: Doubleday. ISBN 0385012683.
- Whitley, M. J. (1988). Destroyers of World War Two. Annapolis, Maryland: Naval Institute Press. ISBN 0-87021-326-1.
- Wukovits, John (2010). Pacific Alamo: The Battle for Wake Island. NAL: Caliber. ISBN 978-1-101-65818-5.
