= Battle of Wake Island =

World War II battle in the Pacific Ocean (1941)

- Part of the Pacific Theater of World War II
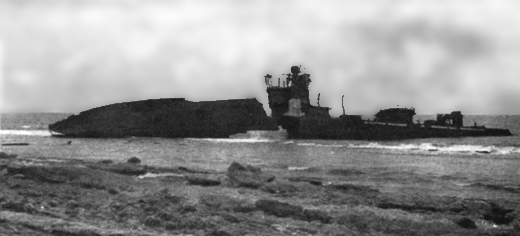
- Japanese Patrol Boat #33 (formerly Hagi) run aground on Wake.
Date	8–23 December 1941
Location	Wake Island, United States
Result	Japanese victory

Belligerents
Japan	United States

Commanders and leaders
Shigeyoshi Inoue; Sadamichi Kajioka; Shigematsu Sakaibara; Eiji Gotō; Tamon Yamaguchi	Winfield S. Cunningham (POW); James Devereux (POW); Paul A. Putnam (POW); Henry T. Elrod †

Strength
First Attempt (11 December): 3 light cruisers 6 destroyers 2 patrol boats 2 troop transports 1 submarine tender 3 submarines Reinforcements arriving for Second Attempt (23 December): 2 aircraft carriers 2 heavy cruisers 2 destroyers 2,500 infantry	449 USMC personnel consisting of: 399 infantry of the 1st Defense Battalion; 50 det. VMF-211; 6 coastal artillery pieces 12 aircraft 12 anti-aircraft guns 68 U.S. Navy personnel 5 U.S. Army personnel 1,221 civilian workers

Casualties and losses
First attempt: 2 destroyers sunk 340 killed 65 wounded 2 missing 1 submarine sunk Second attempt: 2 patrol boats wrecked 10 aircraft lost 21 aircraft damaged 600 casualties	52 killed 49 wounded 2 missing 12 aircraft lost 1 dredge seized 1 scow sunk 433 captured
- 70 civilians killed 1,104 civilians interned, of whom 180 died in captivity

The Battle of Wake Island was a battle of the Pacific campaign of World War II, fought on Wake Island. The assault was one of five simultaneous assaults on American naval and air bases in the Pacific on the morning of 8 December 1941 (7 December in Hawaii), with the Battle of Wake Island ending on 23 December, with the surrender of American forces to the Empire of Japan. It was fought on and around the atoll formed by Wake Island and its minor islets of Peale and Wilkes Islands by the air, land, and naval forces of the Japanese Empire against those of the United States, with marines playing a prominent role on both sides.

The battle started with a surprise bombing raid on 8 December 1941, within hours of Pearl Harbor, and the air raids continued almost every day for the duration of the battle. There were two amphibious assaults, one on 11 December 1941 (which was rebuffed) and another on 23 December, that led to the Japanese capture of the atoll. In addition, there were several air battles above and around Wake and an encounter between two naval vessels. The U.S. lost control of the island and 12 fighter aircraft; in addition to the garrison being taken as prisoners of war, nearly 1,200 civilian contractors were also captured by the Japanese. The Japanese lost about two dozen aircraft of different types, four surface vessels, and two submarines as part of the operation, in addition to at least 600 armed forces. It is typically noted that 98 civilian POWs captured in this battle were used for slave labor and then executed on Wake Island in October 1943. The other POWs were deported and sent to prisoner of war camps in Asia, with five executed on the sea voyage.

The island was held by the Japanese for the duration of the Pacific War; the remaining Japanese garrison on the island surrendered to a detachment of United States Marines on 4 September 1945, two days after Japan surrendered to General Douglas MacArthur on the battleship USS Missouri in Tokyo Bay.

== Prelude ==
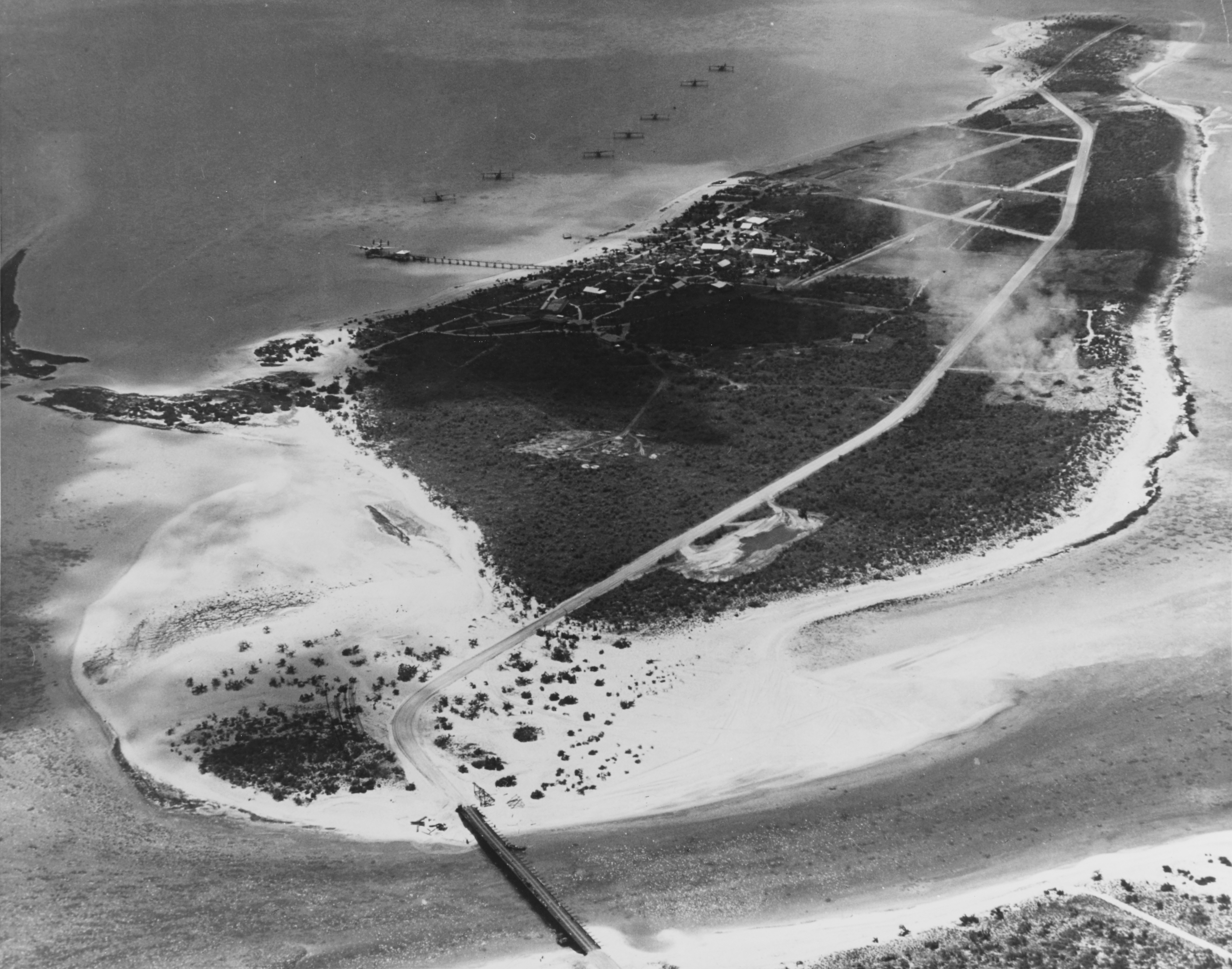
Peale islet in May 1941: The bridge across the channel goes to the rest of Wake. The Pan-American buildings, pier into the lagoon, and seaplanes are seen.

In January 1941, the United States Navy began construction of a military base on the atoll. On 19 August, the first permanent military garrison, elements of the 1st Marine Defense Battalion deployed to Wake Island under the command of Major J.P.S. Devereux, USMC with a force of 450 officers and men. Despite the relatively small size of the atoll, the Marines could not man all their defensive positions nor did they arrive with all their equipment, notably their air search radar units. The Marine Detachment was supplemented by Marine Corps Fighter Squadron VMF-211, consisting of 12 F4F-3 Wildcat fighters, commanded by Marine aviator Major Paul A. Putnam, USMC. Also present on the island were 68 U.S. Navy personnel.

About 1,221 civilian workers for the Morrison-Knudsen Civil Engineering Company were present on the island for the construction of the military facilities. Most of these men were veterans of previous construction programs for the Boulder Dam, Bonneville Dam, or Grand Coulee Dam projects. Others were men who were in desperate situations and great need for money. The construction plans included an airfield, a seaplane base, a submarine base, and a channel cut through Wilkes Island for submarines to be able to reach the lagoon. The 326-foot dredge Columbia arrived in April 1941 and immediately set about her task.

Pan American Airways also had facilities on the island, which served as one of the stops on the Pan Am Clipper trans-Pacific amphibious air service initiated in 1935. The civilian facility was part of a string of seaplane bases that opened the first commercial air route across the Pacific, and other stops were at islands across the Pacific. The flying boats were some of the largest fixed-wing aircraft of the day, and the tickets were very expensive but did allow a much faster trip to Asia and Australia. A couple dozen or so Pan-American employees, plus 45 Chamorro men (native Micronesians from the Mariana Islands and Guam) were employed at the company's facilities on Wake Island, which included a seaplane base and a hotel. Pan Am remained in operation up to the day of the first Japanese air raid in December 1941. The Marines were armed with six 5-inch (127 mm)/51 cal pieces, originating from the old battleship Texas; twelve 3 in (76 mm)/50 cal anti-aircraft guns (with only a single working anti-aircraft director among them); eighteen .50 in (12.7 mm) Browning heavy machine guns; and thirty .30 in (7.62 mm) heavy, medium, and light water- and air-cooled machine guns.

The Marines were still equipped with the bolt-action M1903 Springfield rifle (firing 30-06), as they had yet to switch over to the semi-automatic M1 Garand rifle. Other small arms included Thompson submachine guns and pistols in .45 caliber, as well as hand grenades.

One of the tasks of the newly built air base was resupplying B-17 bombers transiting the Pacific Ocean.

On 28 November, naval aviator Commander Winfield S. Cunningham, USN reported to Wake to assume overall command of U.S. forces on the island. He had ten days to examine the defenses and assess his men before war broke out. The United States had two Tambor-class submarines operating around Wake Island.

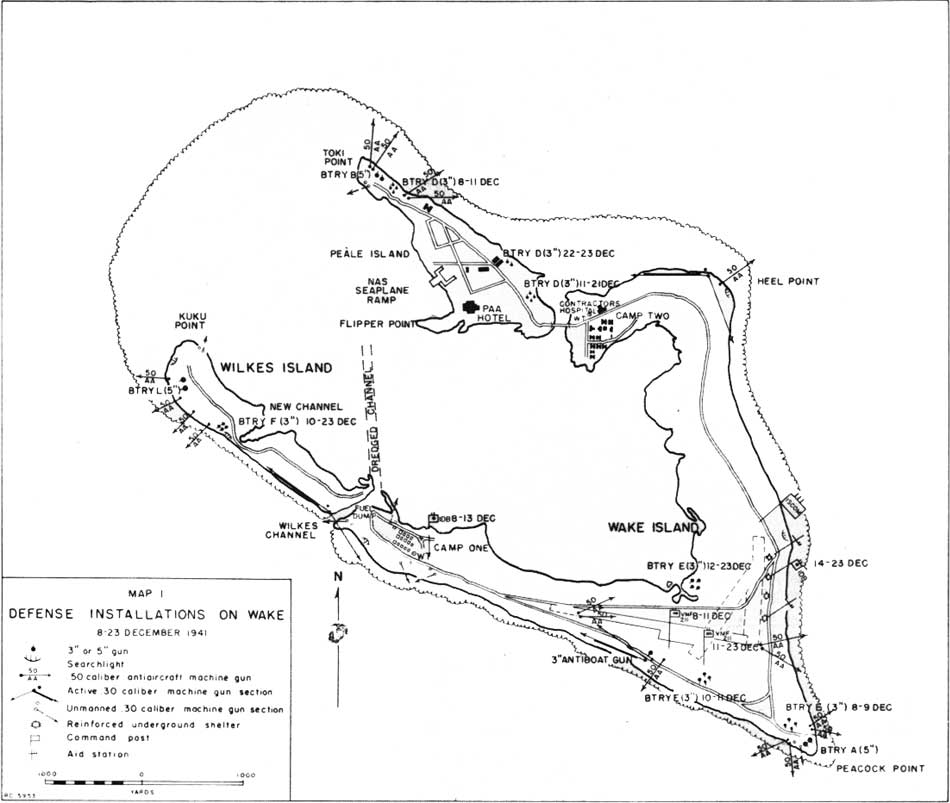
Wake Island in December 1941

On 6 December, Japanese Submarine Division 27 (Ro-65, Ro-66 and Ro-67) was dispatched from Kwajalein Atoll to patrol and blockade the pending operation. The attack would start with air raids from Japanese island bases at Kwajalein to the south. The invasion fleet for the amphibious assault was also being assembled. The date of the coming attack on Wake would be 8 December 1941, but it was the same time as the 7 December 1941 Pearl Harbor attack because it was on the other side of the date line.

== Initial airstrike and bombings ==
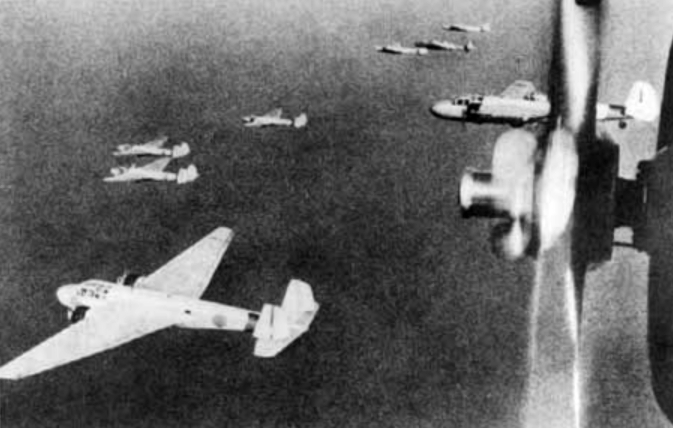
A group of Japanese G3M bombers in 1942, this is the type that bombed Wake (Allied codename "Nell")

Sunday 7 December 1941 was a clear day on Wake Island. The day before, Devereux ordered a practice drill for his Marines, which was the first one done because of the great need to focus on the island's defenses. The drill went well enough that Devereux commanded the men to rest and take their time relaxing, doing laundry, writing letters, thinking, cleaning, or doing whatever they wished.

On Monday, 8 December 1941, the day started normally enough, a China Clipper Martin M-130 had left and was on its way to Guam with passengers, when it received a radio message about the attack on Pearl Harbor, and was told to return to Wake. Wake was on the other side of the date line, so though just hours away in time from Pearl Harbor, the massive attacks by Japan came on Monday, not Sunday.

Just hours after receiving word of the attack on Pearl Harbor, 36 Japanese Mitsubishi G3M3 medium bombers flown from bases on the Marshall Islands attacked Wake Island, destroying eight of the 12 F4F-3 Wildcats on the ground and sinking the Nisqually, a former Design 1023 cargo ship converted into a scow. The remaining four F4F Wildcats were in the air patrolling, but because of poor visibility, failed to see the attacking Japanese bombers. These Wildcats shot down two bombers on the following day. All of the Marine garrison's defensive emplacements were left intact by the first raid, which primarily targeted the aircraft. Of the 55 Marine aviation personnel, 23 were killed and 11 were wounded. The Japanese bombing raid killed nine Pan Am employees and destroyed many of the buildings.

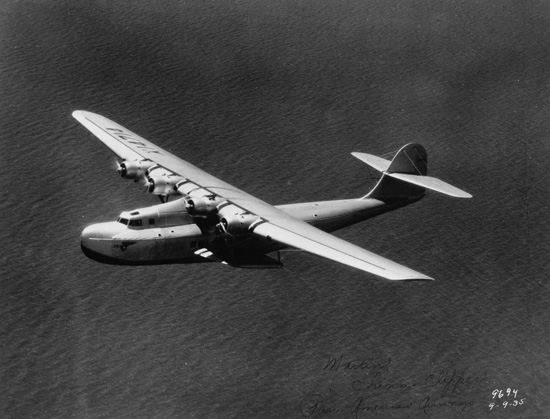
A Martin M130 Clipper, a 4-engined flying boat Pan-American used on commercial routes across the Pacific. Wake Island was one of their stopovers on the way to Guam.

Following this attack, the Pan Am employees were evacuated, along with the passengers of the Philippine Clipper, as the Martin 130 had survived the attack unscathed, save a few bullet holes. The surviving Chamorro workers did not board the plane and were left behind. The aircraft was stripped down to hold as many as possible, and about 40 passengers could fit but they had to sit on the bare floor. The Philippine Clipper took three take-off attempts to get airborne and then flew to Midway, then Honolulu, and finally San Francisco over three days, and the passengers provided first-hand accounts of the attack. The passengers not only experienced the Wake air raid, but also had seen damage at Midway and Pearl Harbor on the way back to San Francisco. Midway was also attacked that day along with Wake and Pearl; it was shelled by two Japanese destroyers that withdrew after being hit by Midway's shore batteries. The attack destroyed a PBY Catalina and there were several casualties, along with damage to the facilities there.

Of the 45 Chamorros, five were killed and five wounded in the initial airstrikes on 8 December, the five who were wounded died the next day in the hospital when the hospital was bombed. The military commander of Wake asked the surviving Chamorros if they would help defend the island; they agreed and helped fortify the island. They were taken POW, with 33 surviving the war, and in 1982 they were granted veteran status for their contributions during the battle.

Two more air raids followed in the following days. The main camp was targeted on 9 December, destroying the civilian hospital and the Pan Am air facility. The next day, enemy bombers focused on outlying Wilkes Island. Following the raid on 9 December, the four antiaircraft guns had been relocated in case the Japanese had photographed the positions. Wooden replicas were erected in their place, and the Japanese bombers attacked the decoy positions. A lucky strike on a civilian dynamite supply set off a chain reaction and destroyed the munitions for the guns on Wilkes.

Late on the night of 10 December 1941 the submarine USS Triton, operating south of Wake, fired four torpedoes at what it thought to be a Japanese destroyer in the landing invasion fleet destroyer picket line, that was going to arrive at Wake that morning of the 11th.

After an unsuccessful Japanese landing attempt on 11 December, there would be air raids most days by G3M "Nells" and/or flying boats, with the F4F Wildcats and anti-aircraft batteries trying to defend. Meanwhile, back at Pearl Harbor a plan was developed to resupply Wake and evacuate the civilian contractors.

== First landing attempt (11 December) ==
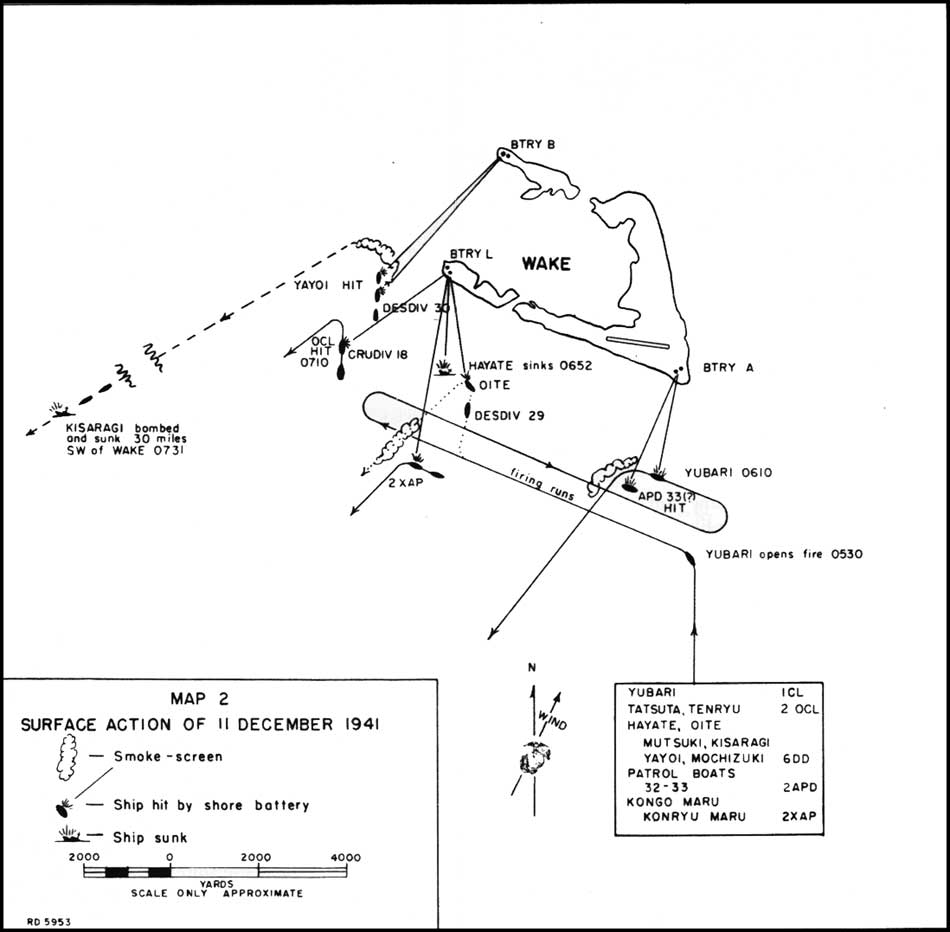
Diagram of the December 11 battle at Wake

Early on the morning of 11 December, the garrison, with the support of the four remaining Wildcats, repelled the first Japanese landing attempt by the South Seas Force.

The Japanese invasion fleet for the 11 December assault included the light cruisers Yūbari, Tenryū, and Tatsuta; the older Mutsuki and Kamikaze-class destroyers Yayoi, Mutsuki, Kisaragi, Hayate, Mochizuki and Oite, submarine tender Jingei, two armed merchantmen (Kinryu Maru and Kongō Maru), and two Momi-class destroyers converted to patrol boats that were reconfigured in 1941 to launch a landing craft over a stern ramp (Patrol Boat No. 32 and Patrol Boat No. 33) containing 450 Special Naval Landing Force troops. Submarines Ro-65, Ro-66, and Ro-67 patrolled nearby to secure the perimeter.

In the early morning hours of 11 December the Japanese fleet moved within range and began shelling the island around 06:00. The island was already on alert by morning because Cunningham had been informed the Japanese were trying to jam radio communication during the night. Prior to the landing assault, Cunningham had been working to get the civilians away, but Pearl Harbor had lost so many ships in the December 7 attack that there were fewer resources available for a relief mission. Because of the concern over radio jamming, Wake was able to send up four serviceable F4F Wildcats on patrol before the invasion fleet arrived.

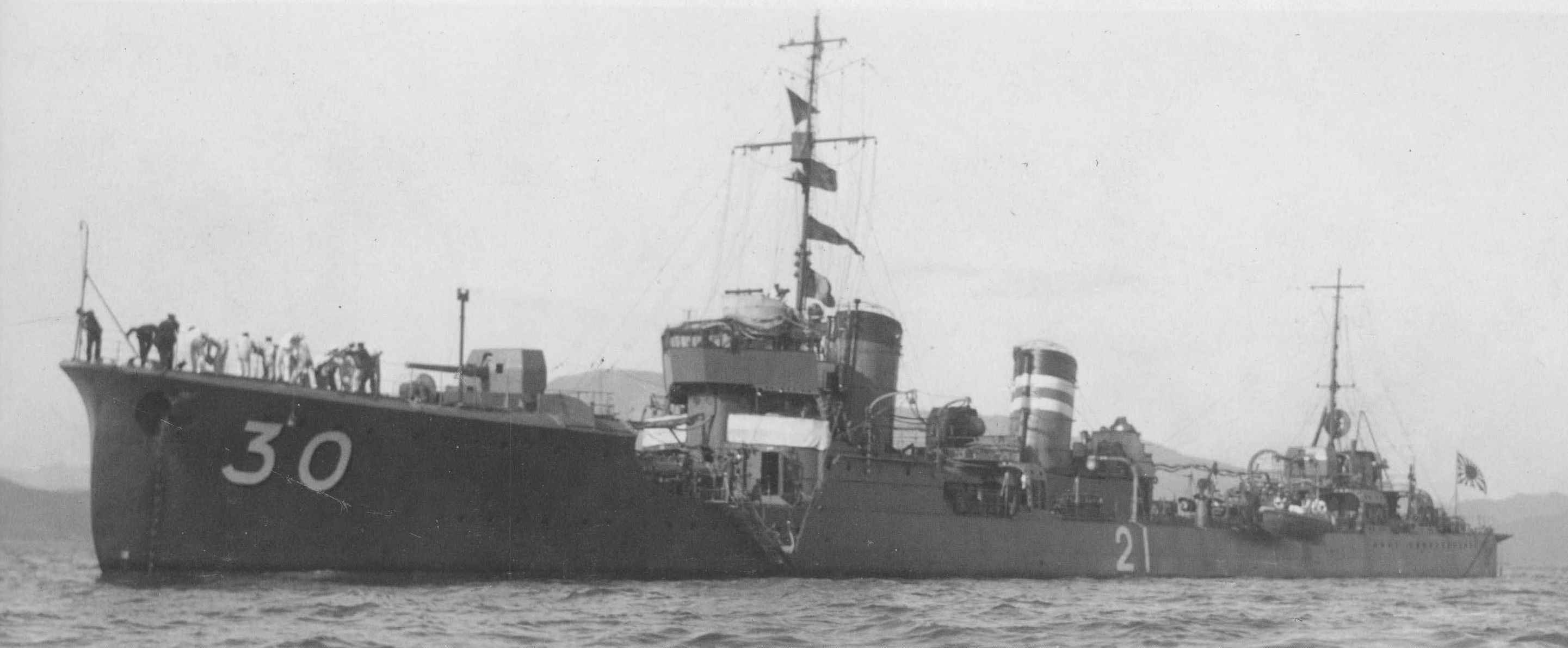
The Kisaragi (shown here in 1927) was lost in the December 11 assault.

After Japanese ships were spotted Cunningham ordered that the guns hold fire until they got into closer range. The US Marines began firing at the invasion fleet with their six 5-inch (127 mm) coast-defense guns as they approached the island.

"Battery L", on Peale islet, sank Hayate at a distance of 4,000 yd (3,700 m) with at least two direct hits to her magazines, causing her to explode and sink within two minutes, in full view of the defenders on shore. Battery A claimed to have hit Yubari several times, but her action report makes no mention of any damage. The four Wildcats also succeeded in sinking the destroyer Kisaragi by dropping a bomb on her stern, where the depth charges were stored, although some also suggest the bomb hitting elsewhere and an explosion amidships. Two destroyers were thus lost with nearly all hands (there was only one survivor, from Hayate), with Hayate becoming the first Japanese surface warship to be sunk in the war. The Japanese recorded 407 casualties during the first attempt. The Japanese force withdrew without landing, suffering their first setback of the war against the Americans.

Later in the day, the Japanese conducted an air raid of 17 G3M2 "Nell" bombers, of which, between the defending F4F Wildcats and anti-aircraft, they claimed two shot down and 11 damaged. The invasion fleet returned to the Japanese-controlled Marshall Islands, and preparations for the Wake relief mission continued in Hawaii. During the battle, one Wildcat had been hit by fire, which, although landing safely, rendered it unserviceable. This left three Wildcats available for air patrols.

After the initial raid was fought off, American news media reported that, when queried about reinforcement and resupply, Cunningham was reported to have quipped, "Send us more Japs!" In fact, Cunningham sent a long list of critical equipment—including gunsights, spare parts, and fire-control radar—to his immediate superior: Commandant, 14th Naval District. The siege and frequent Japanese air attacks on the Wake garrison continued, without resupply for the Americans, even though progress was being made on how to accomplish this.

The next day, 12 December, began with a bombing raid by a Kawanishi H6K Type 97 "Mavis" which was shot down by a Wildcat; later in the day, 26 G3M2 "Nell" attacked. Wake defenders shot down one Nell and damaged four, although there was some damage to a building and an AA gun. News of the battle reached the US mainland, which unfortunately reported in news broadcasts that the garrison on Wake Island was "very small"; on Wake they could hear these broadcasts, which was a bit disconcerting that their size was revealed, and there was no resupply yet.

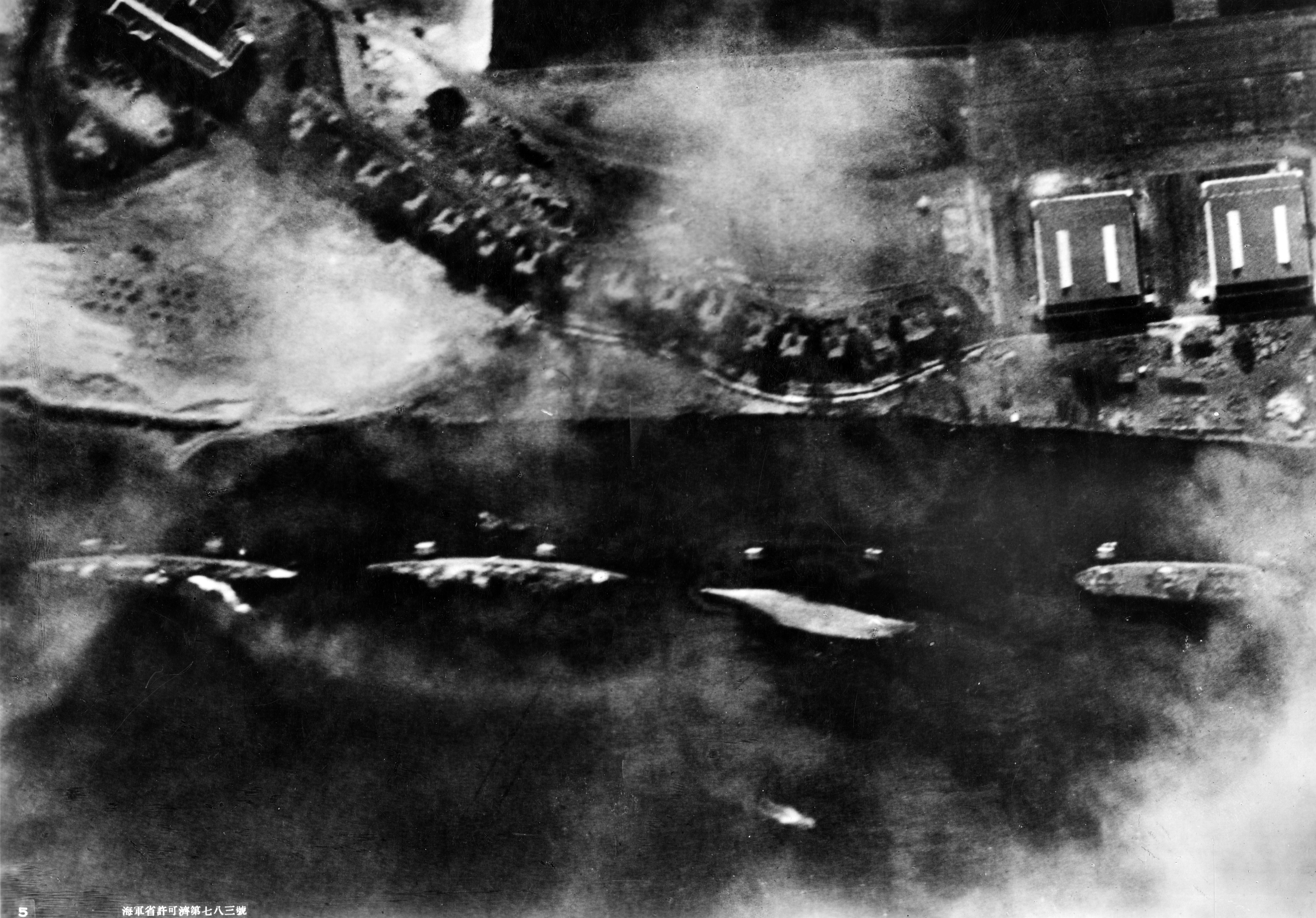
7 December 1941: Photograph taken from a Japanese Navy plane during the Pearl Harbor attack, the Tangier (AV-8) is the ship on the far right in this row.

A Wake resupply mission was under planning but was held back by the availability of ships. Finally, a Navy war-planning officer made a breakthrough; they realized that if they converted a seaplane tender (which was available) and the people on Wake took no possessions, they could squeeze everyone into it, even 1,500 people. So work to prepare the seaplane tender USS Tangier, which had survived the Pearl Harbor attack, got underway in Hawaii. A way to provide air and sea protection for the transport would have to be worked out, though.

== PBY visit and carrier strike (December 20–21) ==
A PBY arrived on December 20, 1941, with a delivery of mail. When it departed it took one passenger, Lt. Colonel Walter Bayler, who became known as the last Marine to leave Wake Island before its capture. Bayler was withdrawn because he was one of the few Marine Corps officers who had experience establishing air–ground communications networks and had knowledge of the still top-secret US radar program. The PBY was very exciting for the military and civilians on the island, especially those hoping for an evacuation; indeed, the PBY carried secret orders to begin the evacuation of civilians. The orders for the Wake commander were to prepare most of the contractors for evacuation and also to let him know what equipment was going to be supplied by the relief mission, such as a radar, ammunition, and additional personnel. This also allowed the Wake Island staff to provide a detailed account and paperwork for the battle that had been occurring. The PBY was refueled and took off the next morning of 21 December 1941, with one additional passenger.

The Japanese intercepted radio transmissions from the PBY, which caused them to move the second landing attempt forward one day. On the morning of 21 December, the second and larger invasion fleet departed their base in the Marshalls, and the carrier group accelerated. The carrier group came within range of Wake on 21 December.

On 21 December 49 aircraft attacked Wake, striking from a Japanese carrier group consisting of the Hiryū and Sōryū. After the raid, an F4F Wildcat was launched to try to follow the carrier planes back to their base, and the Wake commander also notified Pearl of the attack. There was an additional air raid later that day, with 33 G3M2 Nells striking Wake, and this killed a platoon sergeant and wounded several others; these came from the Japanese base on Roi.

On 22 December, a carrier air raid from the Hiyru and Soryu consisting of 39 planes arrived. The Wildcats defended, and in the ensuing air battle, both were shot down, with one just making it back to base and the other was not heard from. The Japanese admiral Abe of the carrier group was impressed by the courage of two Marine pilots and made a note of this.

Meanwhile, back at Pearl, Vice Admiral William S. Pye—the Acting Commander in Chief of the Pacific Fleet—who had gotten the reports from the PBY visit, was also impressed by the brave defense. This increased the Americans' resolve to rescue Wake even if it meant risking the Tangier. The idea would be to send the Tangier in with two destroyers to do the relief mission. Farther out to sea, the two carrier groups would support the operation. However, it was a race against time, as the Japanese fleet would arrive the morning of 23 December 1941.

During this time, there was a US Naval force on the way that was going to resupply Wake on 24 December, but it did not work as planned as the Japanese second wave took the island on 23 December before this could take place. American and Japanese dead from the fighting between December 8 and 23 were buried on the island even before the last stand on 23 December.

== Second assault (December 23) ==
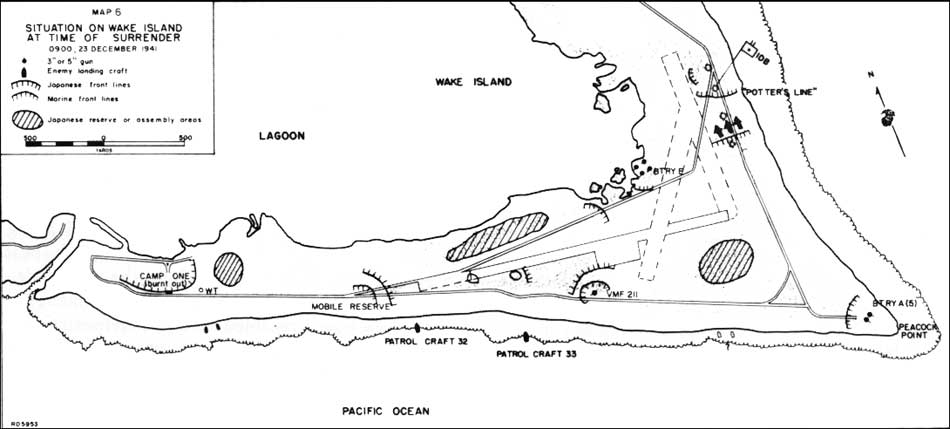
Diagram of battle lines at the conclusion of battle on Wake at the airfield

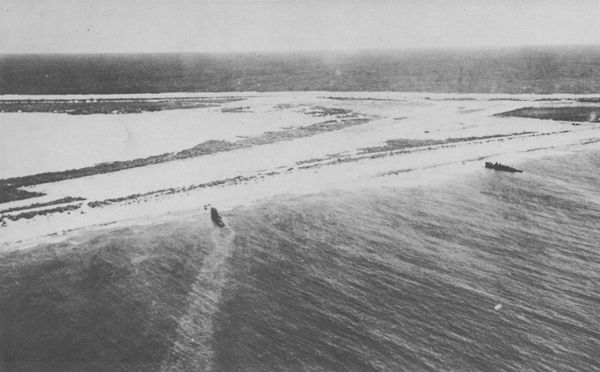
Japanese Patrol Boat No.32 (left) and Patrol Boat No.33

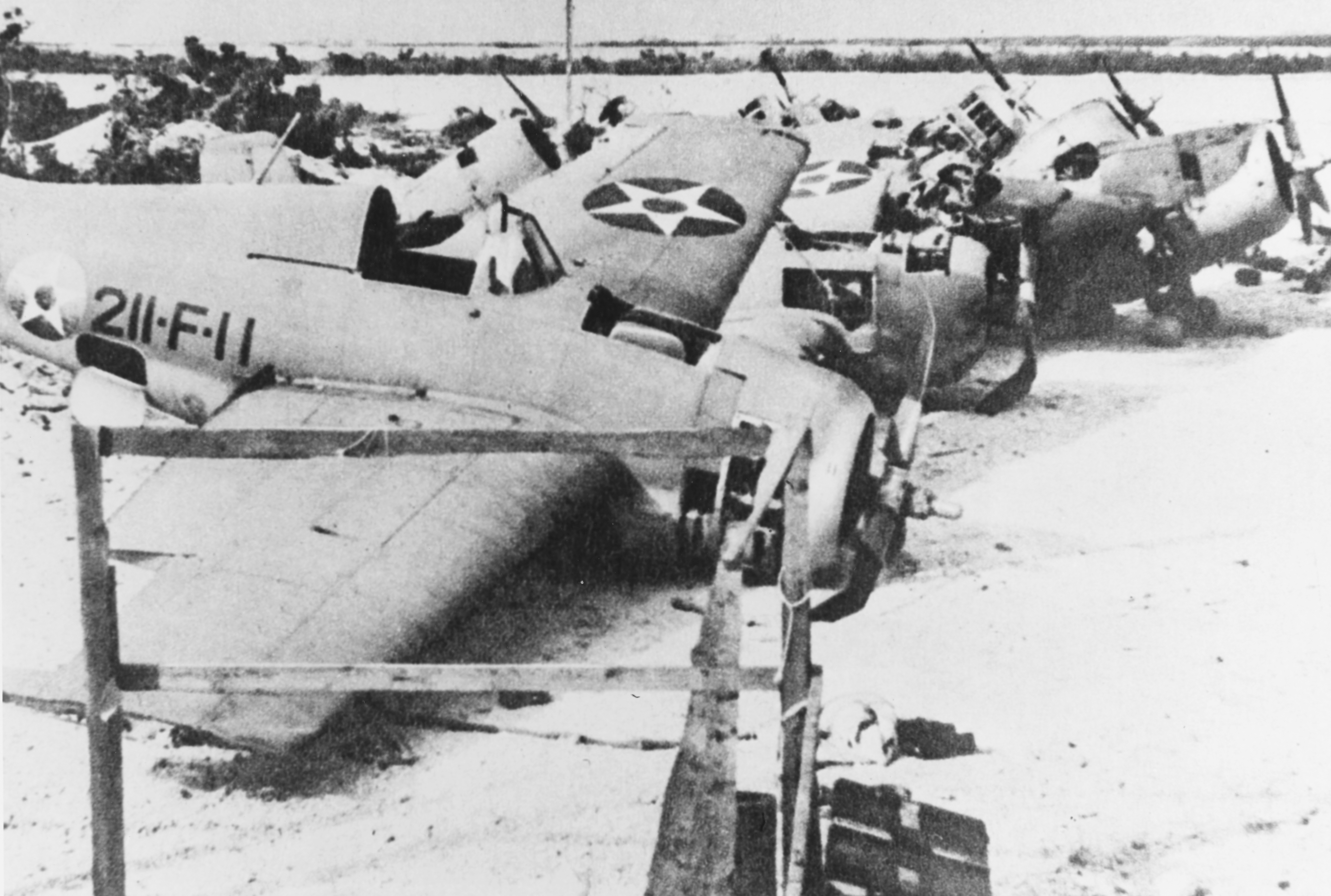
Wreckage of Wildcats including 211-F-11, flown by Captain Henry T. Elrod on December 11 in the attack that sank the Kisaragi.

The initial resistance offered by the garrison prompted the Japanese Navy to detach the Second Carrier Division (Sōryū and Hiryū) along with its escorts 8th Cruiser Division (Chikuma and Tone), and the 17th Destroyer Division (Tanikaze and Urakaze), all fresh from the assault on Pearl Harbor; as well as 6th Cruiser Division (Kinugasa, Aoba, Kako, and Furutaka), destroyer Oboro, seaplane tender Kiyokawa Maru, and transport/minelayer Tenyo Maru from the invasion of Guam; and 29th Destroyer Division (Asanagi and Yūnagi) from the invasion of the Gilbert Islands, to support the assault. The second Japanese invasion force came on 23 December, composed mostly of the ships from the first attempt plus 1,500 Japanese marines. The landings began at 02:35; after a preliminary bombardment, the Japanese landed at different points on the atoll. They were immediately faced with resistance by a "3"-inch gun manned by Lieutenant Robert Hanna. His gun destroyed the ex-destroyers Patrol Boat No. 32 and Patrol Boat No. 33. The Japanese marines bypassed the gun position and attacked the airfield. Meanwhile, a company of Japanese Special Naval Landing Forces Marines landed on Wake. They had advanced quite inland, until they were met with a strong US counterattack led by Captain Platt, which inflicted heavy casualties on the Japanese and forced them to retreat back to their landing area. After heavy fighting, the U.S. Marines guarding the airfield retreated to a final line northeast of the airfield. Unfortunately, Cunningham had received notification of the recall of an American relief expedition that had been dispatched by the Pacific Fleet. With communications disrupted by SNLF men cutting American field phone lines, Devereux assumed that most of his strongpoints on Wake's south shore had been overrun. Cunningham reluctantly issued orders to surrender, and Devereux headed toward the sounds of the fighting to make sure they were obeyed.

The US Marines lost 49 killed, two missing, and 49 wounded during the 15-day siege, while three US Navy personnel and at least 70 US civilians were killed, including 10 Chamorros, and 12 civilians wounded. 433 US personnel were captured. The Japanese captured all men remaining on the island, the majority of whom were civilian contractors employed by the Morrison-Knudsen Company.

In the aftermath of the battle, once the surrender was completed, most of the captured civilians and military personnel were sent to POW camps in Asia. However, some were enslaved by the Japanese and tasked with improving the island's defenses.

Japanese losses were 144 casualties, 140 SNLF and Army casualties with another four aboard ships. At least 28 land-based and carrier aircraft were also either shot down or damaged.

Captain Henry T. Elrod, one of the pilots from VMF-211, was awarded the Medal of Honor posthumously for his actions on the island: he shot down two Japanese G3M Nells, sank the Japanese destroyer Kisaragi, and led ground troops after no flyable U.S. aircraft remained. A special military decoration, the Wake Island Device, affixed to either the Navy Expeditionary Medal or the Marine Corps Expeditionary Medal, was created to honor those who had fought in the defense of the island.

== Surrender and aftermath ==
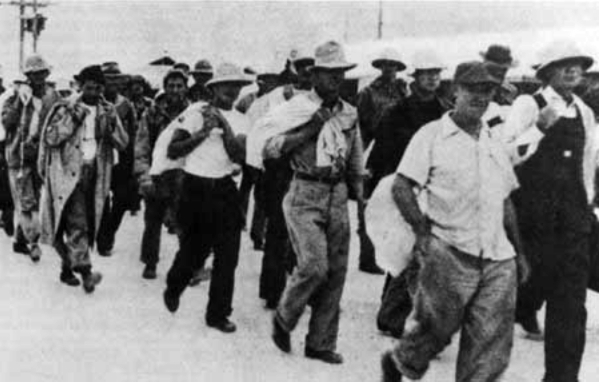
Wake POWs in 1941

After the US surrender on 23 December, the military and civilian POWs were processed by the Japanese. All but about 350-360 were sent away on the Nita Maru on 12 January 1942. In late February, there was the first raid on Wake by the US which consisted of a shore bombardment, some air raids on 23 and 24 of February, and a fight with Japanese patrol boats.

Ro-60, a Japanese submarine that had participated in the battle, but was damaged by an air attack and could no longer submerge, crashed on a reef going back to base on 29 December. All 66 crew members were rescued, but the submarine had to be abandoned there.

=== Nita Maru voyage ===
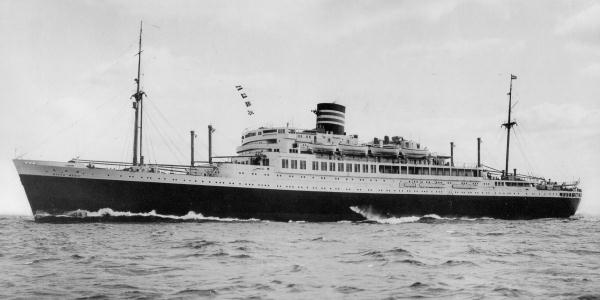
Nitta Maru in passenger service in 1940

At the end of the battle on 23 December, 1,603 people, of whom 1,150 were civilians, were taken prisoner. Three weeks later, all but roughly 350-360 were taken to Japanese prisoner of war camps in Asia aboard the Nita Maru (later renamed Chūyō). Many of those that stayed were those that were too badly wounded, and some were civilian contractors that knew how to operate the machinery on the island. The Nita Maru brought supplies and 500 additional Japanese troops to Wake on 12 January 1942. The POWs were separated; about 20 stayed at the hospital due to injuries; about 367 stayed on Wake due to their construction experience; and over 1,235 were put on the ship. The prisoners on the ship were under the authority of Toshio Saito, and the ship was noted as a "hell ship" for the POWs. Saito encouraged cruel treatment, and the POWs were given too little food and water in unsanitary conditions in the ship's holds, and were systematically beaten and tormented. On 17 January, the ship arrived in Japan, where the POWs were displayed to the Japanese press. On 20 January, it went on a voyage to the prisoner of war camp in Japanese occupied China. Admiral Kajioka had refused a request by an officer to execute some of the POWs, but this officer persisted and went to Saito directly to execute some of them on the voyage. On 22 January, Saito carried out the execution of the Wake POWs. Saito, picked five men at random and ordered them topside. There they were ordered to kneel, and he told them in Japanese: "You have killed many Japanese soldiers in battle. For what you have done you are now going to be killed ... as representatives of American soldiers." The Japanese then beheaded them. The bodies were used for bayonet practice and then thrown overboard.

Those POWs arrived in Shanghai and were transported by train to Woosung, where they spent several years. In 1945, they were taken by train to Manchuria, then Japan, to work in a coal mine. Finally, the war ended, and they were taken to a camp near Tokyo as ordered by the US. One of the last of the Wake POWs to die before repatriation was hit by a container of supplies dropped on the camp by aircraft trying to get food and aid to them. From Japan, they were taken to Guam for processing and medical recovery, then returned home.

==== Additional events ====
Between January and November, 45 POWs died from various causes. On 10 May 1942, one POW was executed. On 11 May 1942, 20 more POWs, including the last military POW, were shipped to China on the Asama Maru.

In September 1942, another 265 were taken off Wake aboard the Tachibana Maru; not including those that had died or been executed, that left 98 on the island.

Shigematsu Sakaibara arrived by aircraft to command Wake starting in December 1942.

In July 1943, a prisoner of war was executed for stealing food, as ordered by Sakaibara; however, the identity of this POW is unknown. On 7 October 1943, the prisoners of war were executed on order of Sakaibara. They were marched into an anti-tank ditch and executed by machine gun fire.

At the end of the war, the Japanese garrison surrendered and said the POWs had been killed in a bombing attack; however, that story broke down when some of the officers wrote notes explaining the true story, and Sakaibara confessed to the mass execution. (For further information, see the Japanese occupation section below.)

== USN relief plans and operations ==
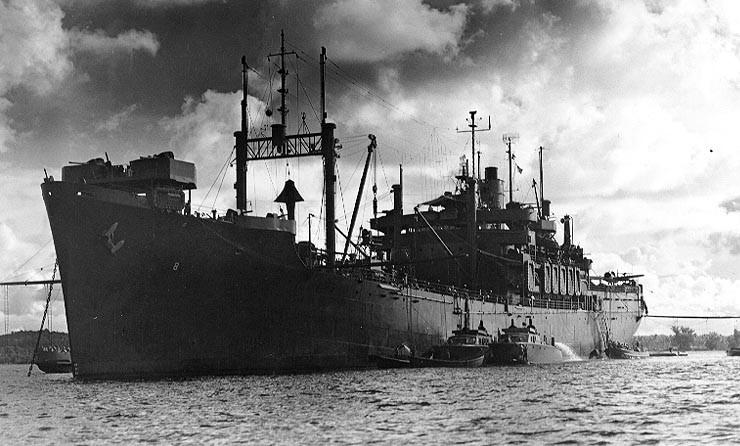
Relief plans centered on the USS Tangier bringing supplies and enable civilian evacuation; it was a survivor of the Pearl Harbor attack.

Admiral Fletcher's Task Force 14 (TF–14) was tasked with the relief of Wake Island while Admiral Brown's Task Force 11 (TF–11) was to undertake a raid on the island of Jaluit in the Marshall Islands as a diversion. A third task force, under Vice Admiral Halsey, centered around the Enterprise was tasked with supporting the other two task forces as the Japanese Second Carrier Division (第二航空戦隊) remained in the area of operations, presenting a significant risk.

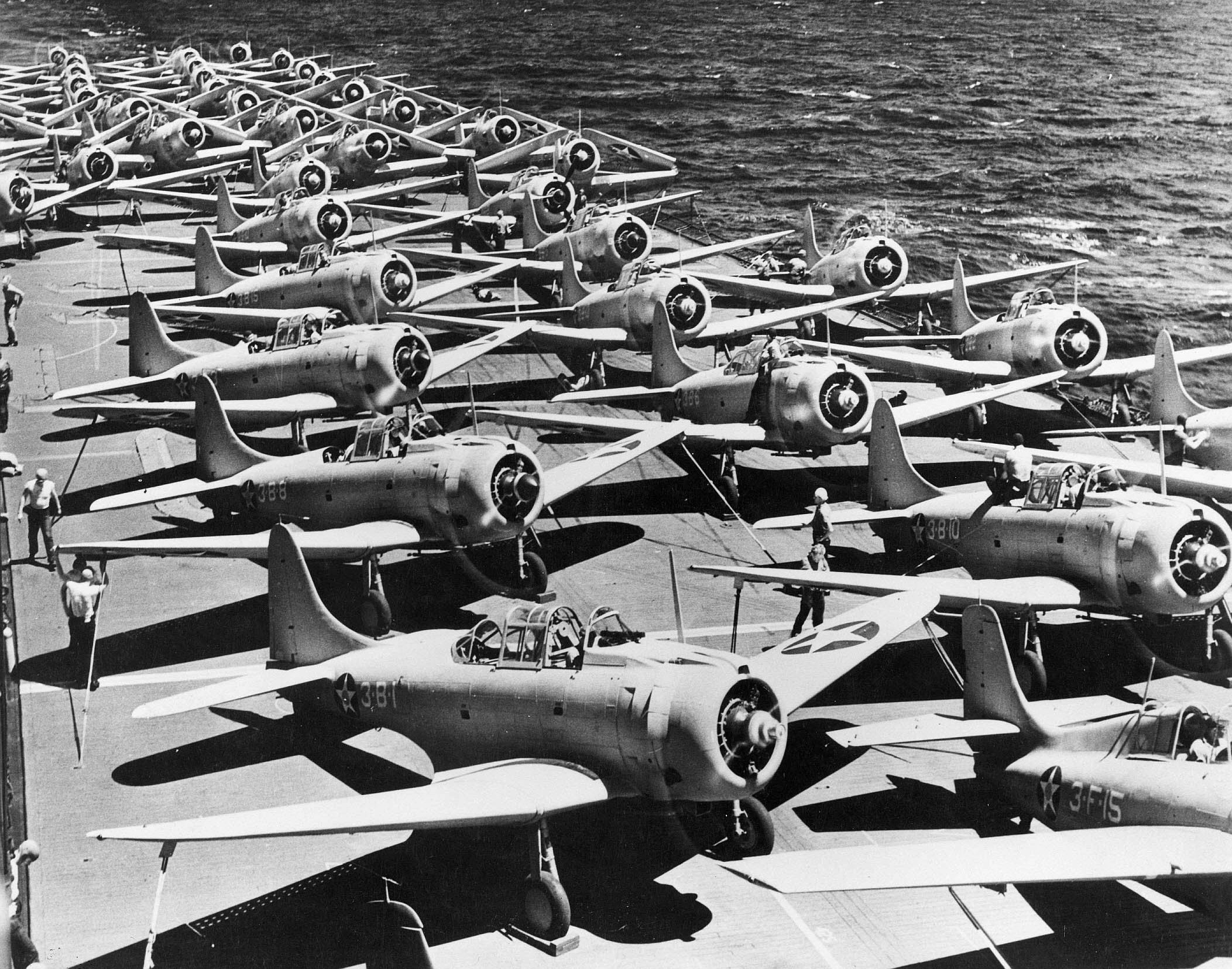
U.S. carrier Saratoga flight deck with Douglas SBD-3 Dauntless and F4F-3 Wildcats in the fall of 1941. Saratoga was en route to Wake when the island was captured

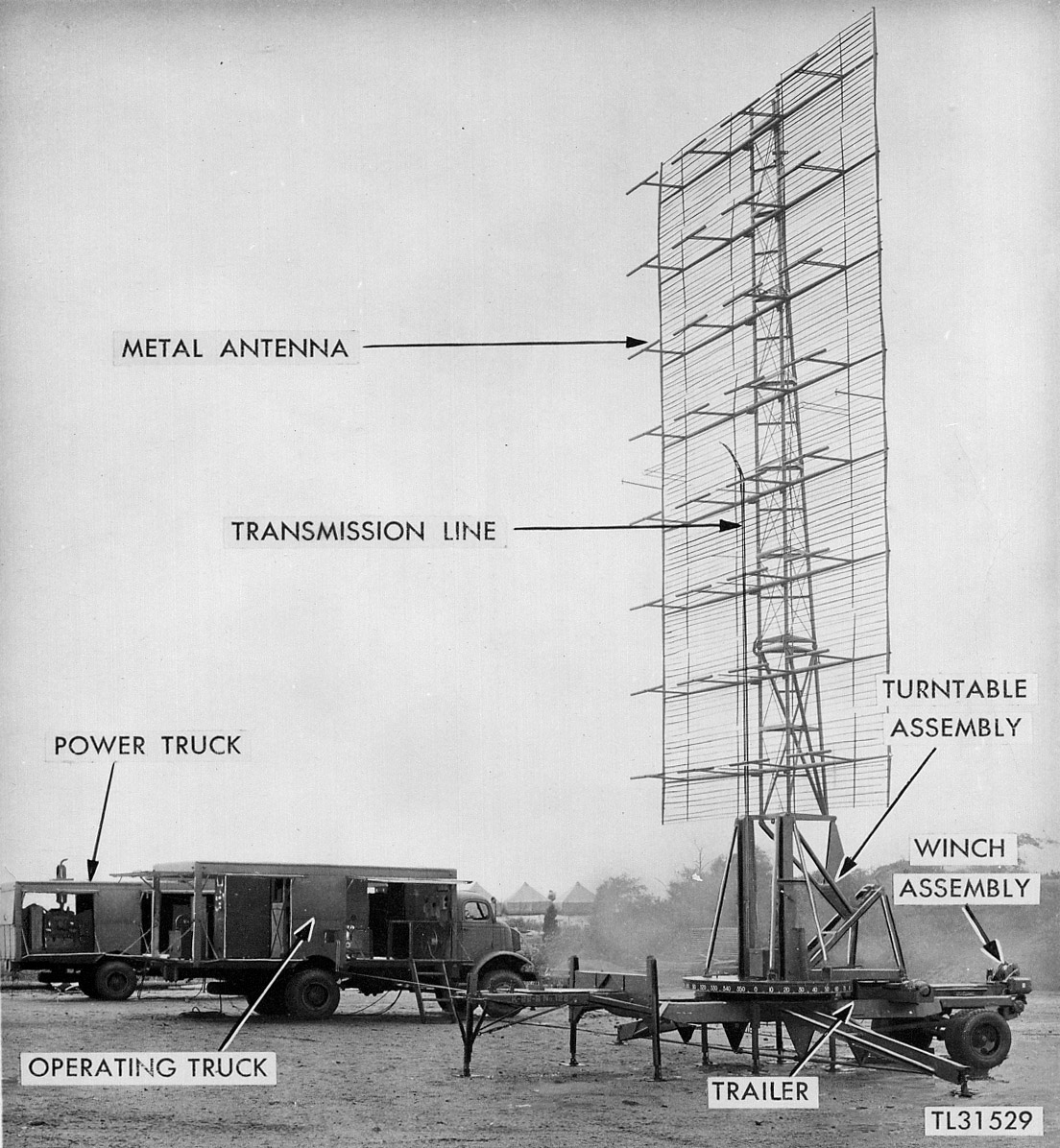
The relief mission was bringing a SCR-270 radar, that would have made it easier to detect air raids

TF–14 consisted of the fleet carrier Saratoga, the fleet oiler Neches, the seaplane tender Tangier (in this case it was outfitted for transport of cargo and people not seaplanes), three heavy cruisers (Astoria, Minneapolis, and San Francisco), and 8 destroyers (Selfridge, Mugford, Jarvis, Patterson, Ralph Talbot, Henley, Blue, and Helm). The convoy carried the 4th Marine Defense Battalion (Battery F, with four 3-inch AA guns, and Battery B, with two 5-inch/51 guns) and fighter squadron VMF-221, equipped with Brewster F2A-3 Buffalo fighters, along with three complete sets of Fire Control equipment for the 3-inch AA batteries already on the island, plus tools and spares; spare parts for the 5-inch coast defense guns and replacement fire control gear; 9,000 5-inch rounds, 12,000 3-inch (76 mm) rounds, and 3 million .50-inch (12.7 mm) rounds; machine gun teams and service and support elements of the 4th Defense Battalion; VMF-221 Detachment (the planes were embarked on Saratoga); as well as an SCR-270 air search radar and an SCR-268 fire control radar for the 3-inch guns, and a large amount of ammunition for mortars and other battalion small arms.

TF–11 consisted of the fleet carrier Lexington, the fleet oiler Neosho, three heavy cruisers (Indianapolis, Chicago and Portland), and the nine destroyers of Destroyer Squadron 1 (squadron flagship Phelps along with Dewey, Hull, MacDonough, Worden, Aylwin, Farragut, Dale, and Monaghan).

At 21:00 on 22 December, after receiving information indicating the presence of two IJN carriers and two fast battleships (which were actually heavy cruisers) near Wake Island, Vice Admiral Pye ordered TF 14 to return to Pearl Harbor.

Saratoga arrived at Pearl on 15 December 1941, refueled, and departed for Wake Island the following day. The ship was assigned to Task Force (TF) 14 under the command of Fletcher; VF-3 had been reinforced by two additional Wildcats picked up in Hawaii, but one SBD had been forced to ditch on 11 December. USS Saratoga rendezvoused with the seaplane tender Tangier, carrying reinforcements and supplies, and the slow replenishment oiler Neches. Saratoga's task force was delayed by the necessity to refuel its escorting destroyers on 21 December, before reaching the island. This process was prolonged by heavy weather, although the task force could still reach Wake by 24 December as scheduled. After receiving reports of heavy Japanese carrier airstrikes, and then troop landings, TF 14 was recalled on 23 December, the day Wake was captured by the Japanese. On the return voyage, Saratoga delivered VMF-221 to Midway on 25 December 1941. The ship arrived at Pearl Harbor, Hawaii on 29 December 1941 and Fletcher was replaced as commander of Task Force 14 by Rear Admiral Herbert F. Leary the following day. Leary made Saratoga his flagship and Rear Admiral Aubrey Fitch was transferred to a shore command that same day. The task force put to sea on 31 December and patrolled in the vicinity of Midway.

== Submarine actions ==
There were two Tambor-class U.S. submarines on patrol near Wake at the start of the battle, and at least six Japanese submarines participated. The Japanese ultimately lost two submarines in the operation, but not as a direct result of enemy action. Two Japanese submarines collided with each other, sinking one, and another crashed into a reef trying to get back to base after the battle. One US submarine engaged one Japanese vessel to no effect the night of 10 December. (See also Mark 14 torpedo)

The US submarines were its new fleet submarines, and the Japanese had three on patrol: Ro-65, 66, and 67. They then swapped out those three part way through the battle for Ro-60, 61, and 62. They were supported from Japanese base in the Marshall Islands and the submarine tender Jingei. Ro-66 was sunk in collision and Ro-60 damaged during the battle, collided with a reef but Jingei was able to rescue all hands before it sunk.

=== U.S. submarine actions ===
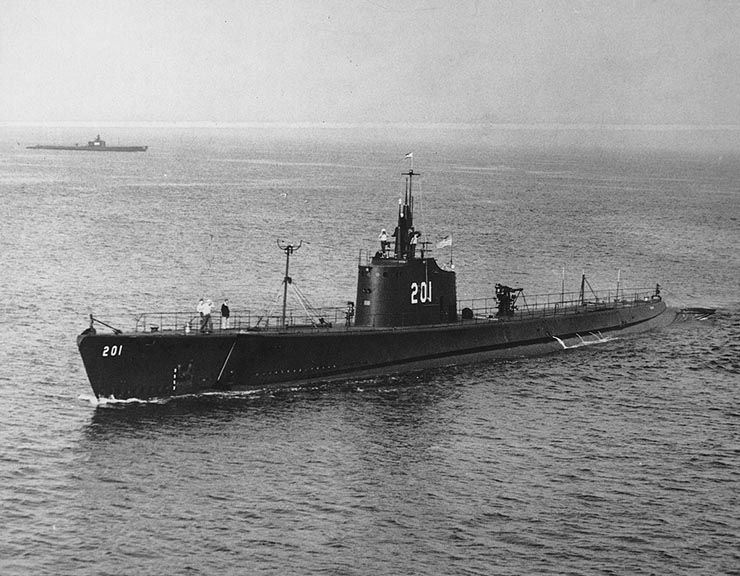
USS Triton around 1940

Prior to and at the start of hostilities, the waters around Wake were patrolled by two USN submarines, the USS Triton and the USS Tambor. Prior to the battle, a Triton crew member became sick and was dropped off at Wake Island on December 1, 1941. He became a prisoner of war at the conclusion of the battle and survived WWII.

Assigned to Submarine Division 62, Triton made a training cruise to Midway from 30 August to 15 September, then participated in local and fleet operations in the Hawaiian area. On 19 November, the submarine headed west to conduct a practice war patrol and arrived off Wake on 26 November 1941. On 8 December, she saw columns of smoke rising over the island, but assumed it was caused by construction work being done ashore. That night, when she surfaced to charge her batteries, she was informed by radio from Wake that Pearl Harbor had been bombed and was ordered to stay out of range of Wake's guns. The next morning, Triton observed the Japanese bombing the island. On the night of 10 December, she surfaced and was charging her batteries when flashes of light from Wake revealed a destroyer or light cruiser on a parallel course. The submarine was silhouetted against the moon, and the enemy ship turned towards her. Triton went deep and began evasive action. When the Japanese ship slowed astern, the submarine came to 120 feet (37 m) and fired four stern torpedoes—the first American torpedoes shot during World War II—on sonar bearings. She heard a dull explosion 58 seconds later and believed one had hit the target, then went to 175 feet (53 m) and cleared the area. (No sinking was recorded, and she was not credited with one.) After their initial repulse on 11 December, the Japanese returned with two aircraft carriers, Hiryū and Sōryū; Triton was not informed, and made no attacks on them. Neither did she make any effort to evacuate people from Wake. On 21 December, the submarine was ordered to return to Hawaii, and she arrived back at Pearl Harbor on 31 December 1941.

Tambor was one of the USN's new fleet submarines when it was commissioned in June 1940, and was on a peacetime patrol near Wake Island when war broke out. It was on patrol near Wake until it had an engine failure and had to go back to port. It had to be repaired and did not return service until early 1942. It was able to observe the Japanese invasion fleet on 10 December 1941, bombarding Wake and its subsequent withdrawal south; however, the Tambor did not pursue them as this was in Triton's patrol area so it headed north. Tambor had to return to its home port in Hawaii in mid-December due to mechanical difficulties and did not have any combat engagements.

=== Japanese submarine actions ===
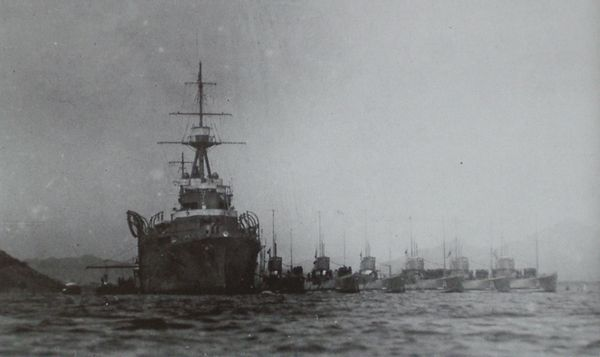
Japanese submarine tender Jingei with Ro-60 class subs. Jingei would rescue the crew of Ro-60 when the battle-damaged submarine ran aground heading back to base.

On 6 December 1941, Ro-66 got underway from Kwajalein with the commander of Submarine Squadron 27 embarked to conduct a reconnaissance of Wake Island,

While the Japanese gathered reinforcements for a second and larger invasion of Wake, Submarine Squadron 7 sent orders to all three submarines of Submarine Division 27 on 12 December 1941 directing them to return to Kwajalein. Accordingly, Ro-65 and Ro-67 headed back to Kwajalein, but a radio failure prevented Ro-66 from receiving the orders despite three attempts by Submarine Squadron 7 to contact her. Consequently, she continued to patrol off Wake Island as the submarines of Submarine Division 26 — Ro-60, Ro-61, and Ro-62 — arrived in the area to relieve the departing submarines.

Ro-66 was on the surface 25 nautical miles (46 km; 29 mi) southwest of Wake Island — bearing 252 degrees from the atoll — to recharge her batteries in a heavy squall in the predawn darkness of 17 December 1941 when her lookouts suddenly sighted Ro-62, also on the surface and recharging batteries. Both submarines attempted to back off, but it was too late to avoid a collision, and Ro-62 rammed Ro-66 at 20:20 Japan Standard Time. Ro-66 sank at 19°10′N 166°28′E with the loss of 63 lives, including that of the commander of Submarine Division 27. Ro-62 rescued her three survivors, who had been thrown overboard from her bridge by the collision.

Ro-60 was with the other submarines of Submarine Division 26 — Ro-61 and Ro-62 — at Kwajalein when Japan attacked on 8 December 1941, Kwajalein time. The three submarines were placed on "standby alert" that day as United States Marine Corps forces on Wake Island threw back the first Japanese attempt to invade the atoll. On 12 December 1941, Ro-60 and Ro-61 got underway from Kwajalein to support a second, heavily reinforced Japanese attempt to invade Wake Island; Ro-62 followed on 14 December 1941.

Ro-60 was on the surface 25 nautical miles (46 km; 29 mi) southwest of Wake at around 16:00 local time on 21 December 1941 when a U.S. Marine Corps F4F Wildcat fighter of VMF-211 attacked her, strafing her and dropping two 100-pound (45.4 kg) bombs. Ro-60 crash-dived, but the attack damaged her periscopes and several of her diving tanks. After she resurfaced that night and her crew inspected her damage, her commanding officer decided that she no longer could dive safely. The Battle of Wake Island ended as Wake fell to the Japanese on 23 December 1941, and that day Ro-60 and Ro-62 received orders to return to Kwajalein. As Ro-60 was approaching Kwajalein Atoll in bad weather in the predawn darkness of 29 December 1941, Ro-60 went off course and ran hard aground on a reef north of the atoll at 02:00 at 09°00′N 167°30′E, damaging her pressure hull and splitting her starboard diving tanks open. At about 13:00, the commander of Submarine Squadron 7 arrived on the scene from Kwajalein aboard his flagship, the submarine tender Jingei, to supervise rescue and salvage operations personally. Pounded by high surf, Ro-60 incurred additional damage and took on such a heavy list that her crew destroyed her secret documents and abandoned ship. Jingei rescued all 66 members of the crew of Ro-60.

== Order of battle ==
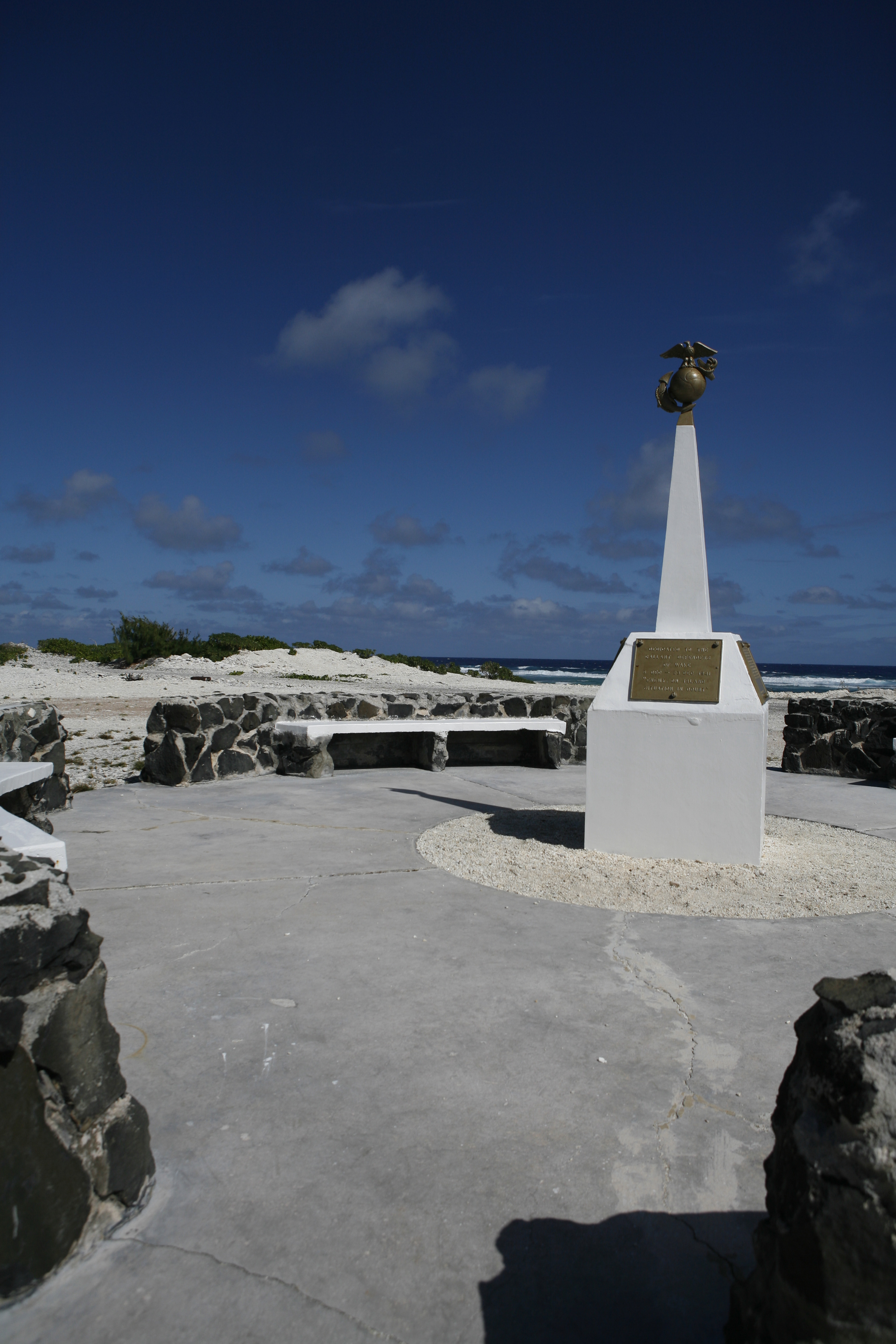
A memorial to the Wake Island defenders stands near the command post of Major Devereux

=== American forces ===
- CinCPac
  - Commandant, 14th Naval District
    - Island Commander, Wake. Cmdr. Winfield S. Cunningham, USN

1st Marine Defense Battalion Detachment, Wake – Major James P.S. Devreaux
Unit	Commander	Remarks
5-inch Artillery Group	Maj. George H. Potter	Batteries A, B and L
3-inch Artillery Group	Capt. Bryght D. Godbold	Batteries D, E and F
VMF-211 (Marine Corps Fighter Squadron)	Maj. Paul A. Putnam	Equipped with 12 Grumman F4F-3 Wildcat fighters

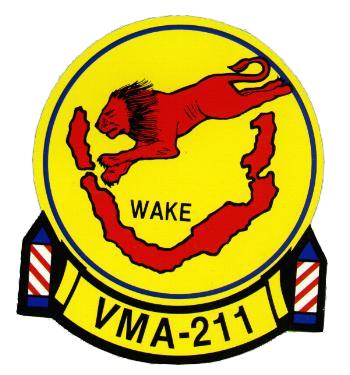
VMA-211 insignia after the war includes a map of Wake Island

== Japanese occupation ==
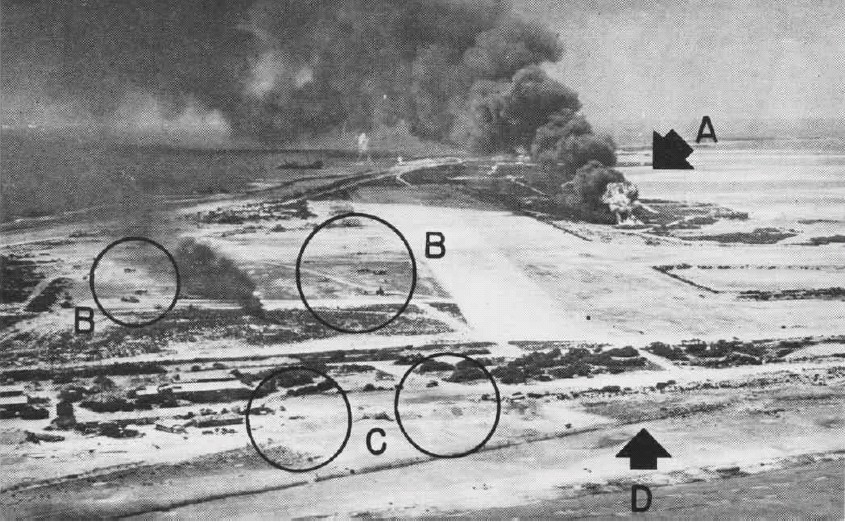
Attack by Yorktown planes in October 1943

Fearing an imminent invasion, the Japanese reinforced Wake Island with more formidable defenses. The American captives were ordered to build a series of bunkers and fortifications on Wake. The Japanese brought in four 8-inch (200 mm) naval guns, which are often incorrectly reported as having been captured in Singapore. The U.S. Navy established a submarine blockade instead of an amphibious invasion of Wake Island. As a result, the Japanese garrison starved, which is thought to have led to their hunting the Wake Island Rail, an endemic bird, to extinction. On 24 February 1942, aircraft from the carrier USS Enterprise attacked the Japanese garrison on Wake Island. U.S. forces bombed the island periodically from 1942 until Japan's surrender in 1945. On 24 July 1943, Consolidated B-24 Liberators led by Lieutenant Jesse Stay of the 42nd Squadron (11th Bombardment Group) of the U.S. Army Air Forces, in transit from Midway Island, struck the Japanese garrison on Wake Island. At least two men from that raid were awarded Distinguished Flying Crosses for their efforts. Future U.S. President George H. W. Bush also flew his first combat mission as a naval aviator over Wake Island. After this, Wake was occasionally raided but never attacked en masse.

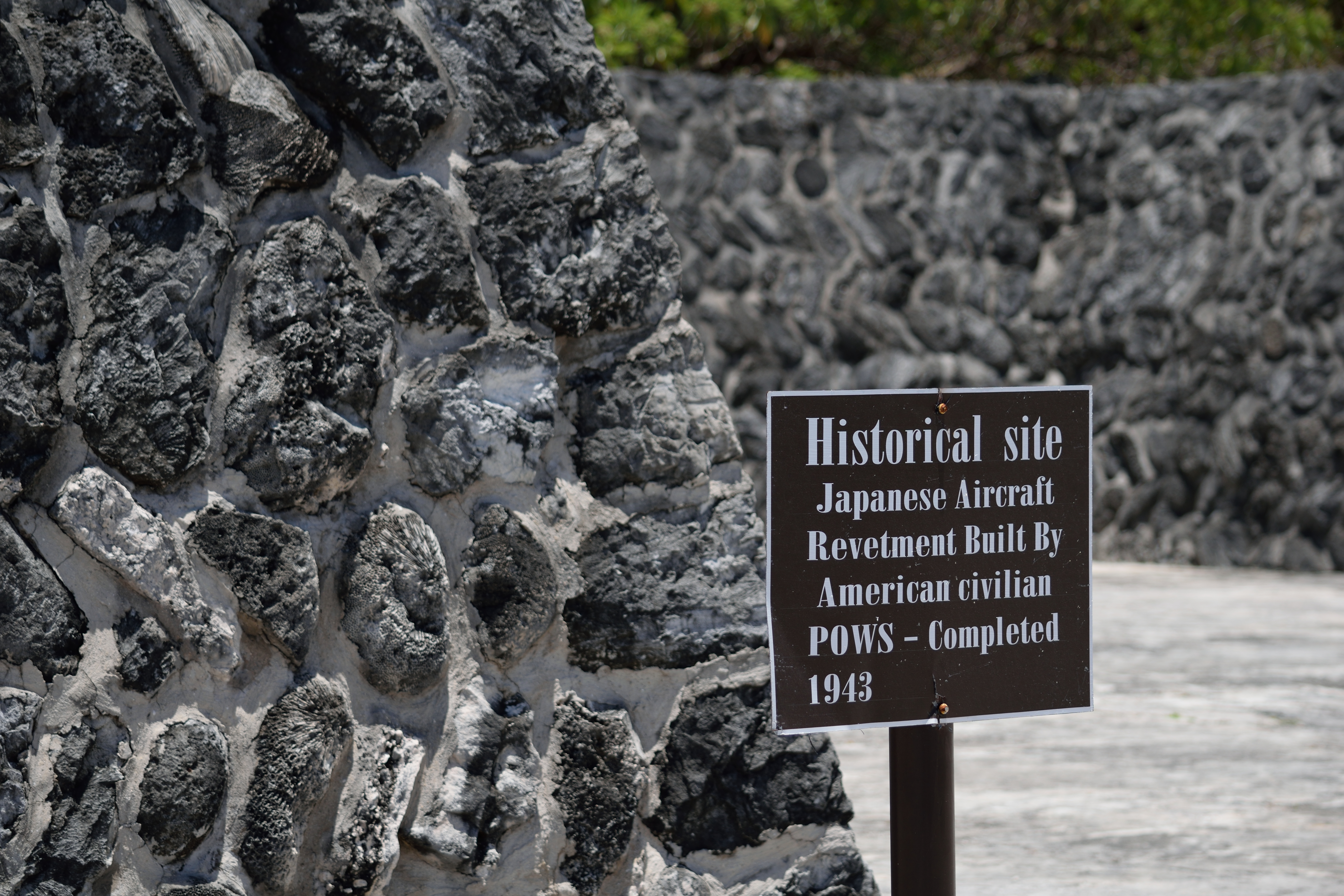
Detail of aircraft revetments built by POWs

From June 1942 to July 1943, there were many B-24 raids and photographic recon missions were launched from Midway to Wake, often resulting in air battles between Zeros and bombers. For example, on 15 May 1943, a raid of seven B-24s was intercepted by 22 Zeros, with the US losing one B-24 and claiming four kills. In July 1943, a B-24 strike targeted the fuel depot, losing another B-24 when intercepted by 20–30 Zeros. The last raid from Midway was in July 1943. The next large strike was combination of naval bombardment and carrier strike aircraft in the October 1943 raids. In the first two months of 1944, Wake was bombed by PB2Y Coronado flying boats operating from Midway to stop Wake from supporting the battle for the Marshall Islands; once allies won the Battle of Kwajalein, Wake was attacked from the newly-won base with B-24 raids. This continued until October 1944, thereafter Wake was only bombed a few more times by carrier strike groups usually heading west. In context, there were much larger Japanese military bases in the Pacific, including over 100 thousand troops stationed in Rabaul by 1943. It had been captured by Japanese forces in January 1942 and turned into a large sea and air base. In addition, they had bases to the south in the Marshall Islands and also west of Wake in Micronesia. The allies had a surprising victory in the Battle of Midway in June 1942; however, the war dragged on for several more years as the Japanese had heavily defended islands throughout the Pacific and a large number of vessels. A decision to take an island had to be taken carefully, as the battles could be extraordinarily costly, with many thousands perishing in battles for remote islands such as the Battle of Tarawa or the Battle of Iwo Jima. So many small islands or atolls were bypassed, like Wake, including Minami Tori Shima ("Southern Bird Island" aka Marcus Island). It was a remote island to the northwest of Wake, with a small Japanese military base that was bombed but not landed upon. However, unlike Wake, Marcus (Minami Tori Shima) island had a working submarine port, which enabled it to be supplied by submarines even late in the war. (see also Japanese submarine Ha-104)

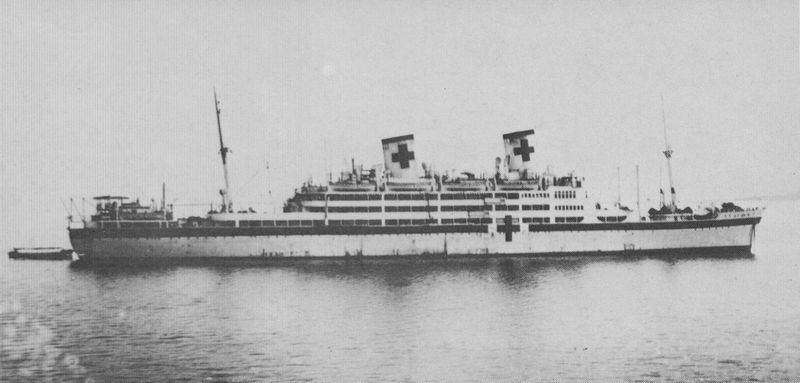
Takasago Maru as a hospital ship in 1945. This was allowed to evacuate nearly a thousand people from Wake in June.

In early 1944, Wake was largely cut off from resupply because the Allies Pacific campaign had moved past Wake. In particular, the Japanese base to the south in the Marshall Islands that had been resupplying Wake was captured in January 1944. By May 1944 the Japanese forces on Wake began rationing food, and the rationing became progressively more strict. Fishing, growing vegetables, bird eggs, and rats were important food supplies at this time, and sometimes tens of thousands of rats were eaten to stave off starvation. Ultimately, however, about 75% of the islands Japanese occupiers died. Their main resupply base was taken in the Allied Gilbert and Marshall Islands campaign, which created a supply issue for the garrison. The Japanese attempted resupply by submarine, but it was difficult to get supplies ashore. In June 1945 the Japanese hospital ship Takasago Maru was allowed to visit Wake Island, and it departed with 974 patients. It was boarded and checked both before and after the visit to confirm it was not carrying contraband, and the number of patients was confirmed; 974 Japanese were taken off Wake. On the way to Wake, it was stopped by the USS Murray and on the way back from Wake it was stopped by USS McDermut to confirm it was carrying the patients. The condition was recorded first hand by the McDermut, which reported that about 15% of the troops that were evacuated by the Japanese were extremely sick. The occupation is believed to have resulted in the extinction of a small flightless bird unique to the atoll, the Wake Island Rail.

=== War crimes ===
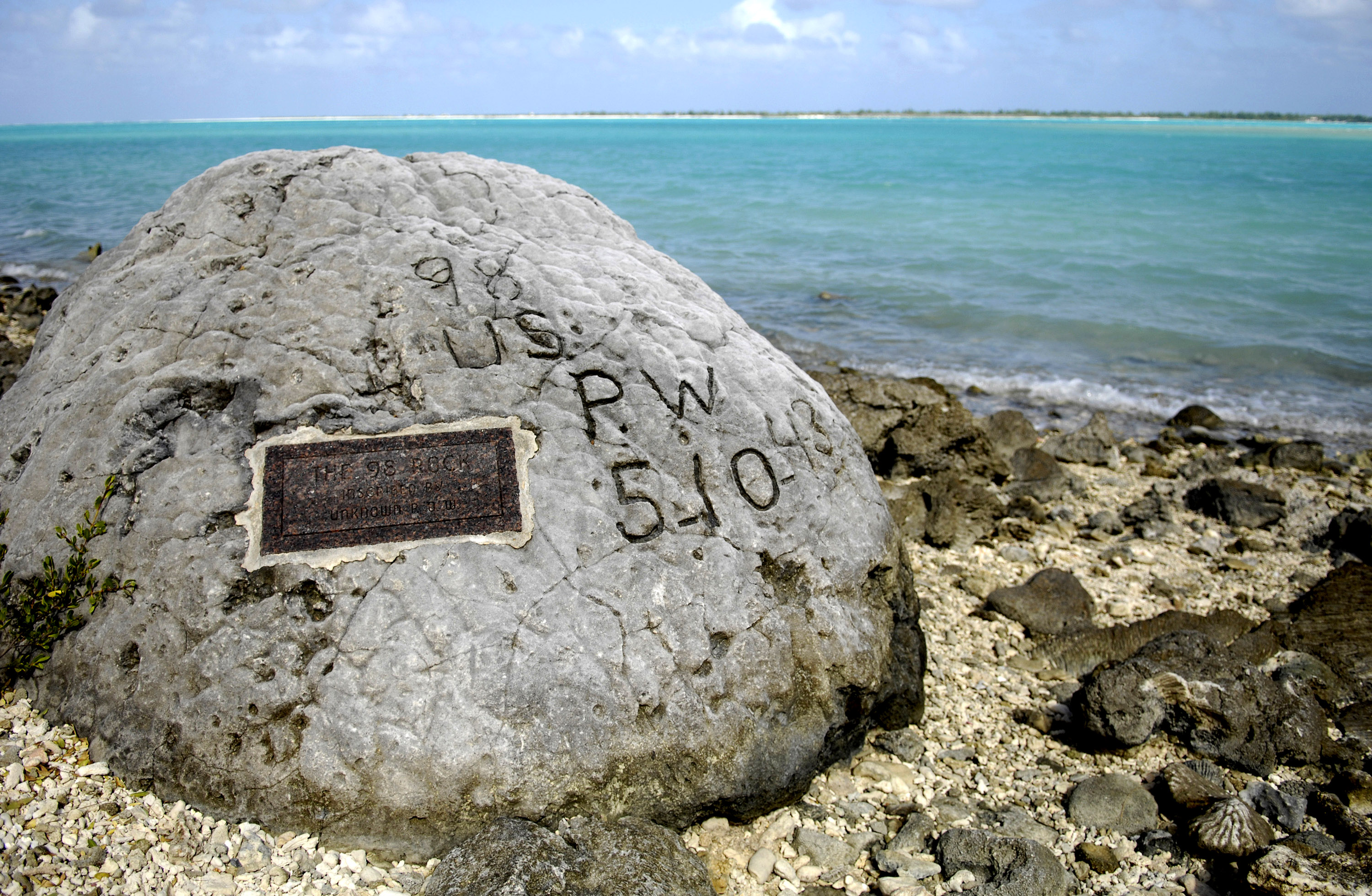
The 98 rock

On 5 October 1943, American naval aircraft from Lexington raided Wake. Two days later, Sakaibara ordered the beheading of an American civilian worker who was caught stealing. He and 97 others had initially been kept to perform forced labor. Fearing an invasion, Sakaibara ordered all of them killed. They were taken to the northern end of the island, blindfolded and executed with a machine gun.

One of the prisoners (whose name has never been discovered) escaped, apparently returning to the site to carve the message "98 US PW 5-10-43" on a large coral rock near where the victims had been hastily buried in a mass grave. The unknown American was recaptured, and Sakaibara personally beheaded him with a katana. The inscription on the rock can still be seen and is a Wake Island landmark.

The Pacific war finally drew to a close starting in August 1945, and the Emperor of Japan announced the surrender to the Japanese people and the agreement was formally signed by 2 September 1945. On 4 September 1945, the remaining Japanese garrison surrendered to a detachment of United States Marines under the command of Brigadier General Lawson H. M. Sanderson, with the handover being officially conducted in a brief ceremony aboard the destroyer escort Levy. Earlier, the garrison received news that Imperial Japan's defeat was imminent, so the mass grave was quickly exhumed and the bones were moved to the U.S. cemetery that had been established on Peacock Point after the invasion, with wooden crosses erected in preparation for the expected arrival of U.S. forces.

During the initial interrogations, the Japanese claimed that the remaining 98 Americans on the island were mostly killed by an American bombing raid, though some escaped and fought to the death after being cornered on the beach at the north end of Wake Island. Several Japanese officers in American custody committed suicide over the incident, leaving written statements that incriminated Sakaibara. Sakaibara and his subordinate, Lt. Cmdr. Tachibana, were later sentenced to death after conviction for this and other war crimes. Sakaibara was executed by hanging in Guam on 19 June 1947, while Tachibana's sentence was commuted to life in prison.

The remains of the murdered civilians were exhumed and reburied at Section G of the National Memorial Cemetery of the Pacific, commonly known as Punchbowl Crater, on Honolulu.

== Historic landmarks ==
The battle left the island filled with WW2 bunkers and landmarks.

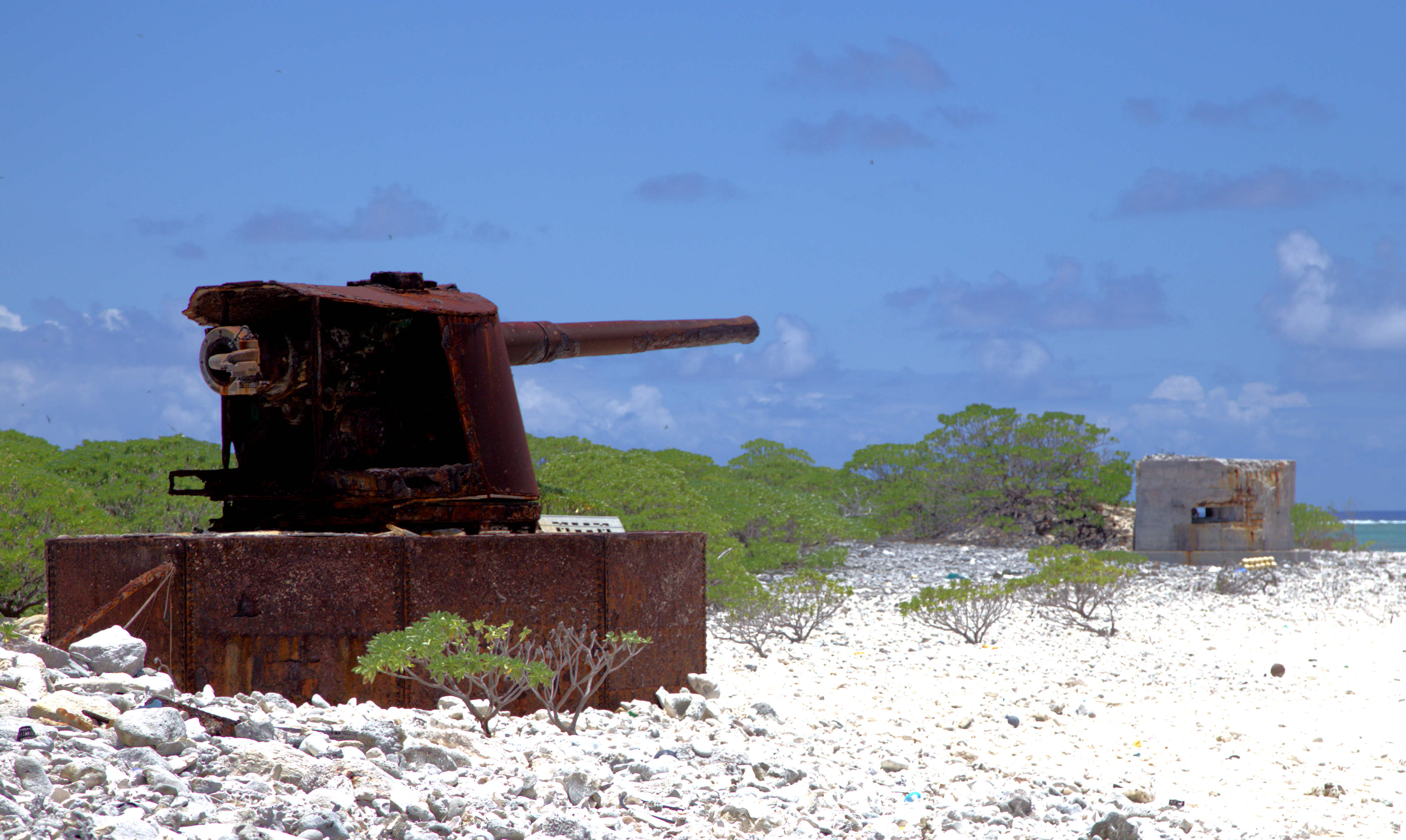
A rusted shore battery

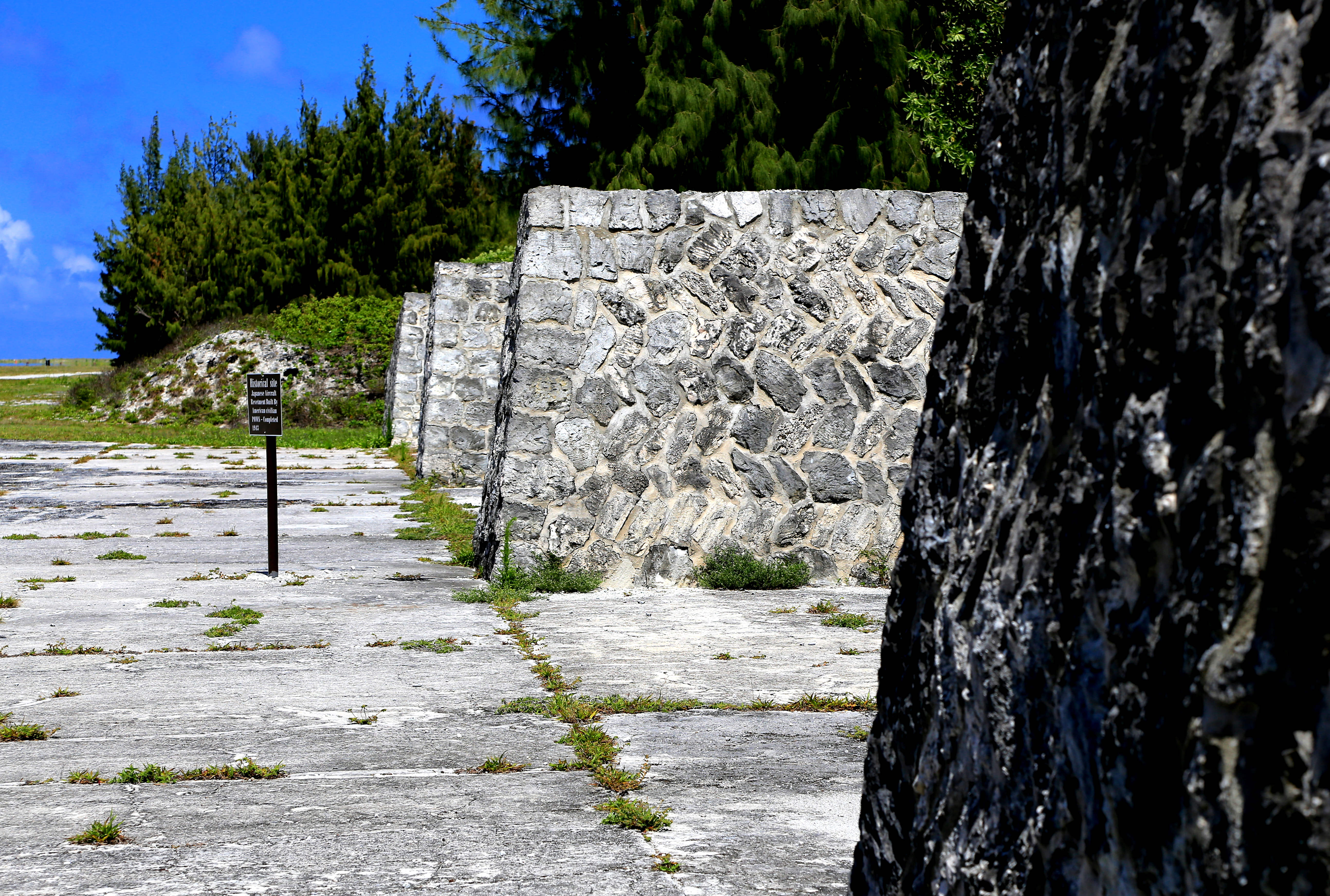
Revetments for aircraft built by POWs

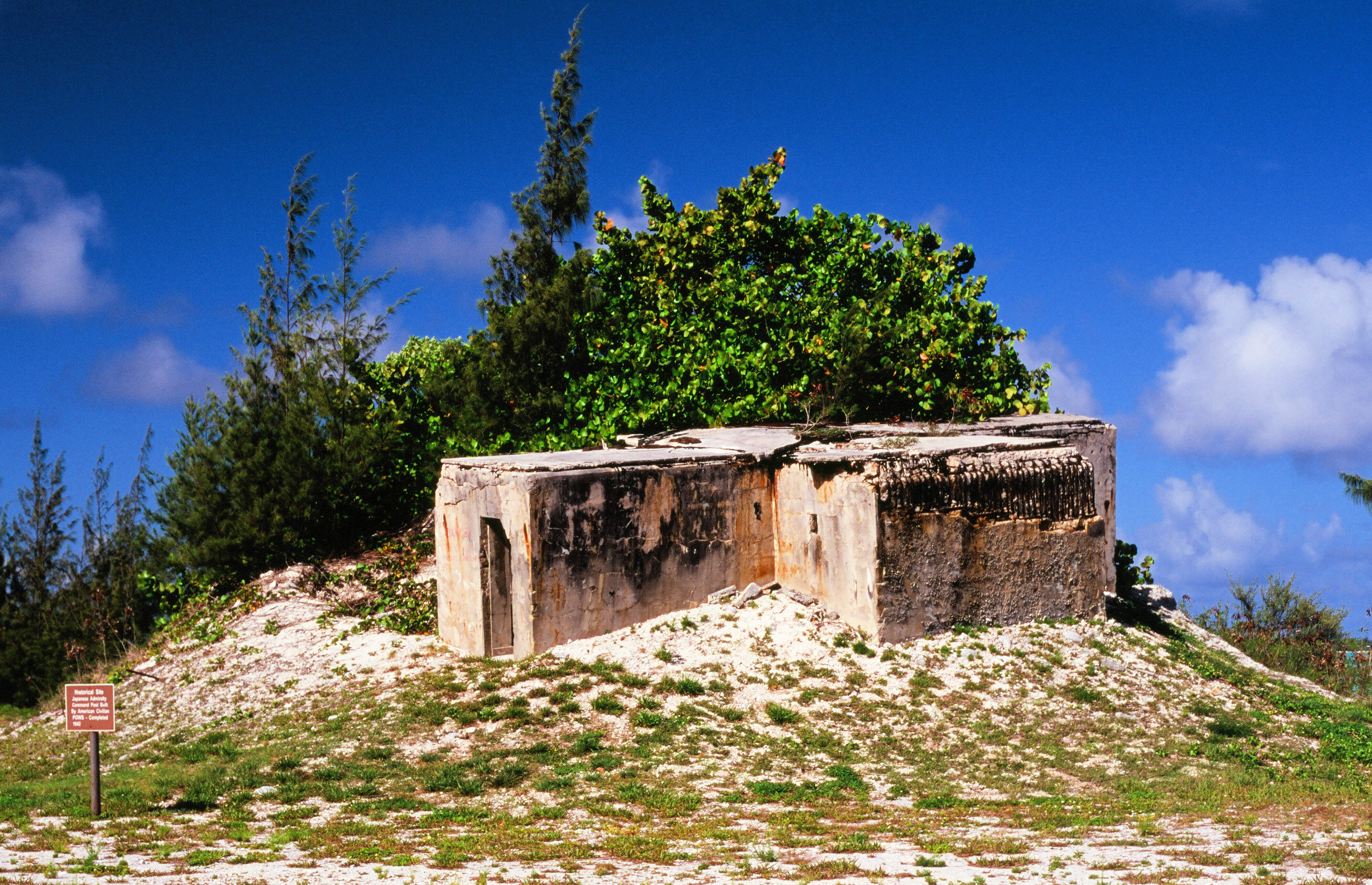
WW2 Bunker

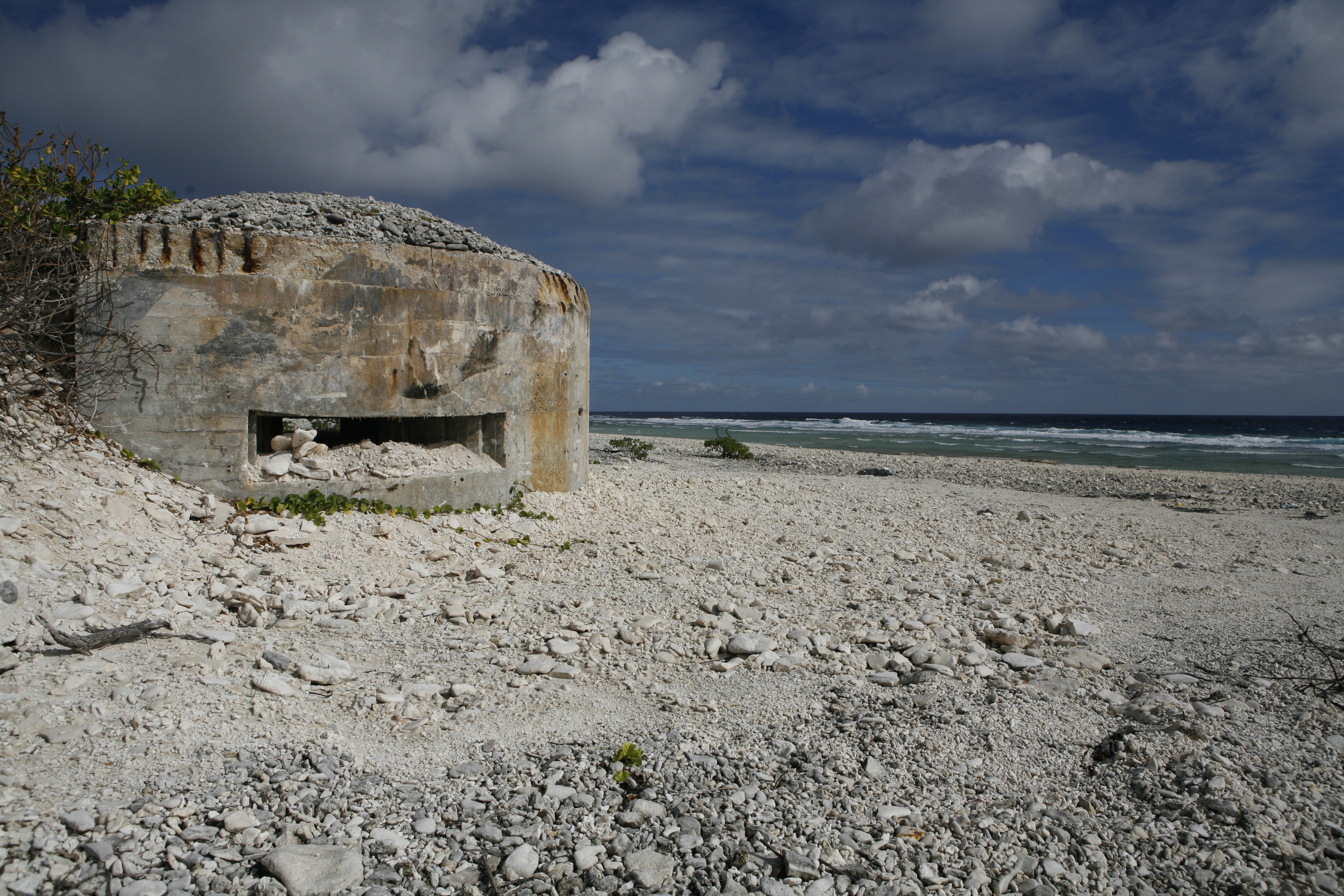
WW2 bunker on Wake overlooking a beach

== See also ==
- Attacks on the United States
  - Attacks on the United States (1900–1945)
- Wake Island (film), a 1942 film about this battle, which was started before the battle was over. It was filmed in the USA and not Wake.
- Shelling of Johnston and Palmyra (another December 1941 attack on nearby US Pacific islands)
- First Bombardment of Midway (December 7, 1941 attacks on nearby US Midway island base)
- Battle of Guam (1941) (Japanese invasion of US held Guam 8–10 December 1941)
