= Columbia (dredge) =

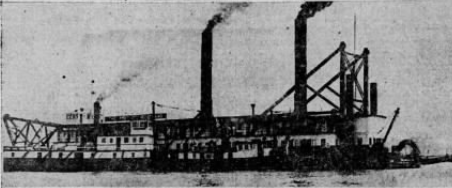
- Dredge Columbia in 1921

United States
- Name: Columbia
- Namesake: Columbia River
- Owner: Port of Portland
- Builder: Pacific Marine Iron Works
- Launched: 24 February 1921, Portland Oregon
- Sponsored by: Port of Portland
- Completed: 15 April 1921
- Fate: sold to the Contractors Pacific Naval Air Bases

United States
- Acquired: March 1921
- Fate: sold to Contractors Pacific Naval Air Bases

Empire of Japan
- Acquired: seized by Japanese forces, 23 December 1941
- Fate: destroyed by naval gunfire, 24 February 1942

General characteristics
- Type: dredge
- Tonnage: {{{amt}}} GRT
- Length: 326 ft 0 in (99.36 m) o/a
- Beam: 44 ft 0 in (13.41 m)
- Draught: 11 ft 8 in (3.56 m)
- Propulsion: steam

Columbia was a steel-hulled, dredge that served for the Port of Portland until 1941.

== History ==
She was launched on 24 February 1921. She was completed on 15 April 1921. She replaced a wooden-hulled dredge of the same name (built 1902) whose equipment was used for the new ship. In March 1941, she was purchased by Contractors Pacific Naval Air Bases and leased to the U.S. Government for service on Wake Island. After the Battle of Wake Island ended on 23 December 1941, she was seized by the Japanese and continued with her work to dig a channel to the lagoon. On 24 February 1942, she was destroyed by naval gunfire from the cruisers Northampton (United States Navy) and Salt Lake City (United States Navy) during a U.S. carrier raid. In December 1945, the repair and salvage ship USS Shackle arrived to refloat and tow the hulk back to Pearl Harbor.
