= Winfield S. Cunningham =

Officer in Charge, Naval Activities, during Battle of Wake Island (1900–1986)

Winfield Scott Cunningham
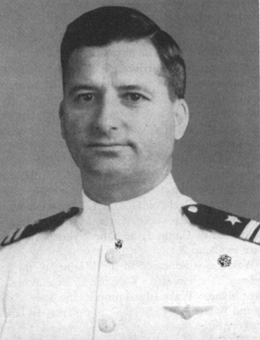
- Captain Winfield S. Cunningham, USN
- Born: February 16, 1900; Rockbridge, Wisconsin
- Died: March 3, 1986 (aged 86); Memphis, Tennessee
- Military career
- Allegiance: United States
- Branch: United States Navy
- Service years: 1916–1950
- Rank: Rear Admiral
- Commands: Wake Island
- Conflicts: World War II: Battle of Wake Island
- Awards: Navy Cross; Bronze Star; Prisoner of War Medal; Navy Expeditionary Medal; World War I Victory Medal; American Defense Service Medal; Asiatic-Pacific Campaign Medal; World War II Victory Medal

Winfield Scott Cunningham (February 16, 1900 – March 3, 1986) was the Officer in Charge, Naval Activities, Wake Island when the tiny island was attacked by the Japanese on December 8, 1941. Cunningham commanded the defense of the island against the massive Japanese attack. After 15 days, he surrendered the island to the Japanese. Cunningham was taken prisoner and held as a POW in Japan. He was awarded the Navy Cross for his leadership at Wake Island.

== Early life ==
Winfield Cunningham was born on February 16, 1900, in Rockbridge, Wisconsin. He was the son of Frederick Michael and Ruth Ella (Moore) Cunningham. Cunningham attended high school at Camp Douglas.

== Military career ==
In 1916, at the age of 16 and after completing his junior year in high school, he was appointed to the United States Naval Academy at Annapolis in Maryland, along the Chesapeake Bay. Because of World War I, his Class of 1920 was graduated a year early – on June 6, 1919. Cunningham was commissioned an ensign in the United States Navy and his first assignment was on the naval transport USS Martha Washington, which brought troops home from France. He would then spend the next two years on ships off the coast of Turkey in the Aegean and Mediterranean Seas. In January 1922, aboard the USS Huron, he sailed for China where he would spend the next year and a half. Returning to the U.S., on May 3, 1923, he was promoted to lieutenant (jg), with his promotion backdated to June 7, 1922.

While serving in China, Cunningham applied to enter aviation training. Though turned down in this first request, he put in requests several times and was finally accepted in 1924. On February 14, 1925, he reported as a student naval aviator to the Naval Air Station Pensacola, Florida. While in training he was promoted to lieutenant on June 7, 1925, and was designated a naval aviator on September 11, 1925, becoming an aviator qualified in both fighters and flying boats.

On November 2, 1936, Lieutenant Commander Cunningham reported for duty involving flying as Commanding Officer of Fighting FIVE (VF-5). The squadron would become part of the USS Yorktown (CV-5) Air Group flying the Grumman F2F-1. Cunningham served in this capacity until the Summer of 1938.

=== Wake Island ===
On November 28, 1941, Cunningham, by now a commander, reported for duty as officer in charge, all naval activities, Wake Island. His command briefing gave top priority to completing the naval air station, over any attention to improving the island's defenses.

On December 8, 1941, news of the attack on Pearl Harbor naval / air bases in Hawaii reached Wake Island at 07:00 am, less than 2 1/2 hours after the Japanese struck further east. Cunningham ordered all personnel to battle stations; at the same time Major James Devereux, USMC commanding officer of the Wake Detachment of the 1st Marine Defense Battalion, ordered a "Call to Arms". Cunningham recalled the Philippine Clipper (a Martin 130 flying boat) of Pan American Airways and set in motion plans for a scouting patrol. It was to take off at 13:00 hours (1:00 pm). However, a bombing attack by the Imperial Japanese Navy began at 1157. The bombing continued for days. On December 11, Japanese warships approached the Island.

Cunningham ordered the Marine commander, Major James Devereux, to hold their fire until the ships were in easy range. The small U.S. force on the island repulsed the initial landing attempt, but they were in serious need of additional supplies and support – including gunsights, spare parts and fire-control radar – which Cunningham had requested earlier from the commandant, 14th Naval District. But no reinforcements were to come by the attack.

Wake remained under attack by the Japanese. After 15 days, with Japanese marines finally swarming over the island, on December 23, 1941, Cunningham finally gave the order for surrender. Cunningham, along with surviving personnel and contractors, were taken captive.

=== Prisoner of war ===
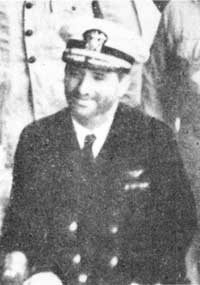
Commander Cunningham as a POW aboard the Japanese transport Nitta Maru, at Yokohama, Japan, January 1942.

Cunningham and his fellow prisoners were taken aboard the Japanese transport Nitta Maru to Shanghai, China by way of Yokohama, Japan. Treatment was harsh – five POWs were executed on board, and the imprisoned contractors left on Wake were later executed. Twice during his captivity, Cunningham attempted to escape and was later recaptured by the Japanese. During his captivity, he lost over 70 pounds. On August 18, 1945, after 1330 days of confinement, the Japanese prison commander announced the end of the war.

On August 24, 1945, Cunningham left China aboard a U.S. Army aircraft. He finally arrived in the U.S., returning on September 4, 1945, the same day Wake Island was formally surrendered by the Japanese to an arriving U.S. Marine detachment.

=== Return to the U.S. ===
On September 10, 1945, Cunningham underwent a complete physical examination at the National Naval Medical Center in Bethesda, Maryland. He was found fit to return to duty. On December 4, 1945, he received notice of his promotion to captain, effective June 20, 1942. In January 1946, he began a period of retraining, beginning with refresher aviation training at the Naval Air Station in Pensacola, Florida.

In May 1946, Captain Cunningham returned to sea duty as the commanding officer of the seaplane tender USS Curtiss (AV-4). During his time as commander, Curtiss operated with patrol squadrons in the Formosa Strait, ferried men and supplies to outlying bases and made several visits to Qingdao, China, before returning the United States in March 1947.

Cunningham's final duty was as commanding officer, Naval Technical Training Center, Memphis, Tennessee, from June 23, 1947, until his retirement on June 30, 1950, at the rank of rear admiral.

=== Retirement ===
After retirement, Cunningham lived in Memphis, Tennessee. He wrote a book, Wake Island Command (1961), about the historic battle. He died on March 3, 1986, at age 86 and was buried in the Memphis National Cemetery.

== Awards ==

Naval Aviator Badge
Navy Cross
Bronze Star Medal	Combat Action Ribbon (posthumous)	Presidential Unit Citation
Prisoner of War Medal (posthumous)	Navy Expeditionary Medal with "WAKE ISLAND" clasp	World War I Victory Medal with "ATLANTIC FLEET" clasp
American Defense Service Medal with "BASE" clasp	Asiatic-Pacific Campaign Medal with one battle star	World War II Victory Medal
Navy Occupation Medal with "ASIA" clasp	China Service Medal	National Defense Service Medal (post retirement)

=== Navy Cross citation ===
The President of the United States of America takes pleasure in presenting the Navy Cross to Commander Winfield Scott Cunningham (NSN: 0-56074), United States Navy, for extraordinary heroism and distinguished service in the line of his profession as Commanding Officer of Commanding Officer, Naval Air Station, Wake Island, where he was responsible for directing defenses of that post during the Japanese siege from 7 through 22 December 1941, against impossible odds. Commander Cunningham's inspiring leadership and the valiant devotion to duty of his command contributed in large measure to the outstanding success of these vital missions and reflect great credit upon the United States Naval Service. General Orders: Bureau of Naval Personnel Information Bulletin No. 317 (August 1943)

Action Date: December 7–22, 1941

== Bibliography ==
- Cunningham, Winfield S. (with Lydel Sims), Wake Island Command, Boston: Little, Brown and Co., 1961. (ASIN B0006AX13C)
- Sloan, Bill. Given Up for Dead: America's Heroic Stand at Wake Island. New York: Random House, 2004. Print.

== See also ==
- James Devereux
- Paul A. Putnam
- Detailed biography of Admiral Cunningham
