= Paul A. Putnam =

United States Marine Corps general

Paul Albert Putnam
- Born: June 16, 1903; Milan, Michigan, U.S.
- Died: May 21, 1982 (aged 78); Mesa, Arizona, U.S.
- Military career
- Allegiance: United States of America
- Branch: United States Marine Corps
- Service years: 1926–1956
- Rank: Brigadier general
- Conflicts: World War II: Battle of Wake Island
- Awards: Navy Cross

Brigadier General Paul Albert Putnam, USMC (June 16, 1903 – May 21, 1982) commanded Marine Corps Fighter Squadron VMF-211 during the defense of Wake Island in December 1941. For his heroism, he was awarded the Navy Cross. He survived three and a half years as a prisoner of war and rose to the rank of brigadier general.

== Early life ==
Paul Albert Putnam was born in Milan, Michigan on June 16, 1903. His family moved to Iowa when he was young and he attended Iowa State University for one year.

== Education ==
Putnam enlisted in the United States Marine Corps on December 1, 1923, and took advantage of an education program called the Marine Corps Institute which enabled him to qualify to become a commissioned officer.

== Early military career ==
He was commissioned as a 2nd lieutenant in the on March 4, 1926. Putnam served three tours of duty in Nicaragua fighting insurgents. After his first tour, he was sent to flight training and served the next two tours as a pilot.

== World War II and Wake Island ==
After rising to the rank of major, he was placed in command a detachment of Marine Corps Fighter Squadron 211 (VMF-211), which arrived at Wake Island on 4 December 1941. Shortly after the Japanese attack on Pearl Harbor on December 7, Japanese forces attacked Wake Island. Seven of VMF-211's twelve aircraft were destroyed in the initial Japanese bombing attack on the airfield.

The remaining planes of Putnam's squadron, along with the other Marines on the island, put up a stout defense but were eventually overwhelmed by superior forces. Putnam, along with Commander Winfield Scott Cunningham, USN and Major James Devereux, USMC, was one of the key leaders of the defense of Wake Island. On December 21, the island was attacked by Japanese aircraft and Putnam took off on an unescorted flight in search of the Japanese aircraft carrier from which the attacking planes were based. For this action, he was awarded the Navy Cross after the war.

On December 23 Wake Island was captured by the Japanese and Putnam, along with the other surviving Wake Island defenders, was taken prisoner. He was held in Japanese POW camps from December 1941 until September 1945, when he was released at the end of the war.

== Post war ==
After the war, Putnam continued his career in the Marine Corps and was promoted to colonel retroactive to November 15, 1942. In 1947 he was awarded the Navy Cross for heroism on December 21, 1941, when he took off in a plane on an unescorted flight in an attempt to find the Japanese aircraft carrier whose planes were attacking Wake Island.

Putnam retired in 1956; he was promoted to brigadier general on the retired list in recognition of his wartime service.

== Awards ==

Naval Aviator Badge
Navy Cross
Combat Action Ribbon (posthumous)	Navy Presidential Unit Citation	Prisoner of War Medal (posthumous)
Marine Corps Expeditionary Medal with "WAKE ISLAND" clasp	Second Nicaraguan Campaign Medal	American Defense Service Medal with "BASE" clasp
Asiatic-Pacific Campaign Medal with one battle star	World War II Victory Medal	National Defense Service Medal

=== Navy Cross citation ===
The President of the United States of America takes pleasure in presenting the Navy Cross to Colonel Paul Albert Putnam (MCSN: 0-4036), United States Marine Corps, for extraordinary heroism and distinguished service in the line of his profession while serving as Commanding Officer and a Pilot in Marine Fighting Squadron TWO HUNDRED ELEVEN (VMF-211), Marine Air Group TWENTY-TWO (MAG-22), Naval Air Station, Wake Island, in action against enemy Japanese forces during the defense of Wake Island on 21 December 1941. When the island was subjected to a relentless attack by carrier-based hostile aircraft, Major Putnam proceeded by truck to the airfield and, although severely strafed by enemy planes on the way and forced to abandon his truck on two occasions, succeeded in reaching his objective. Then, embarking in a friendly fighter plane, he executed an unsupported flight far out to sea in a desperate attempt to locate the Japanese carrier. By his initiative and courage throughout this hazardous action, Major Putnam upheld the highest traditions of the United States Naval Service. General Orders: Commander in Chief Pacific Forces: Serial 11583 (January 14, 1947) Action Date: 21-Dec-41
