= Eastern Aircraft Division =

WW2-era General Motors division created to produce Grumman aircraft for the US Navy

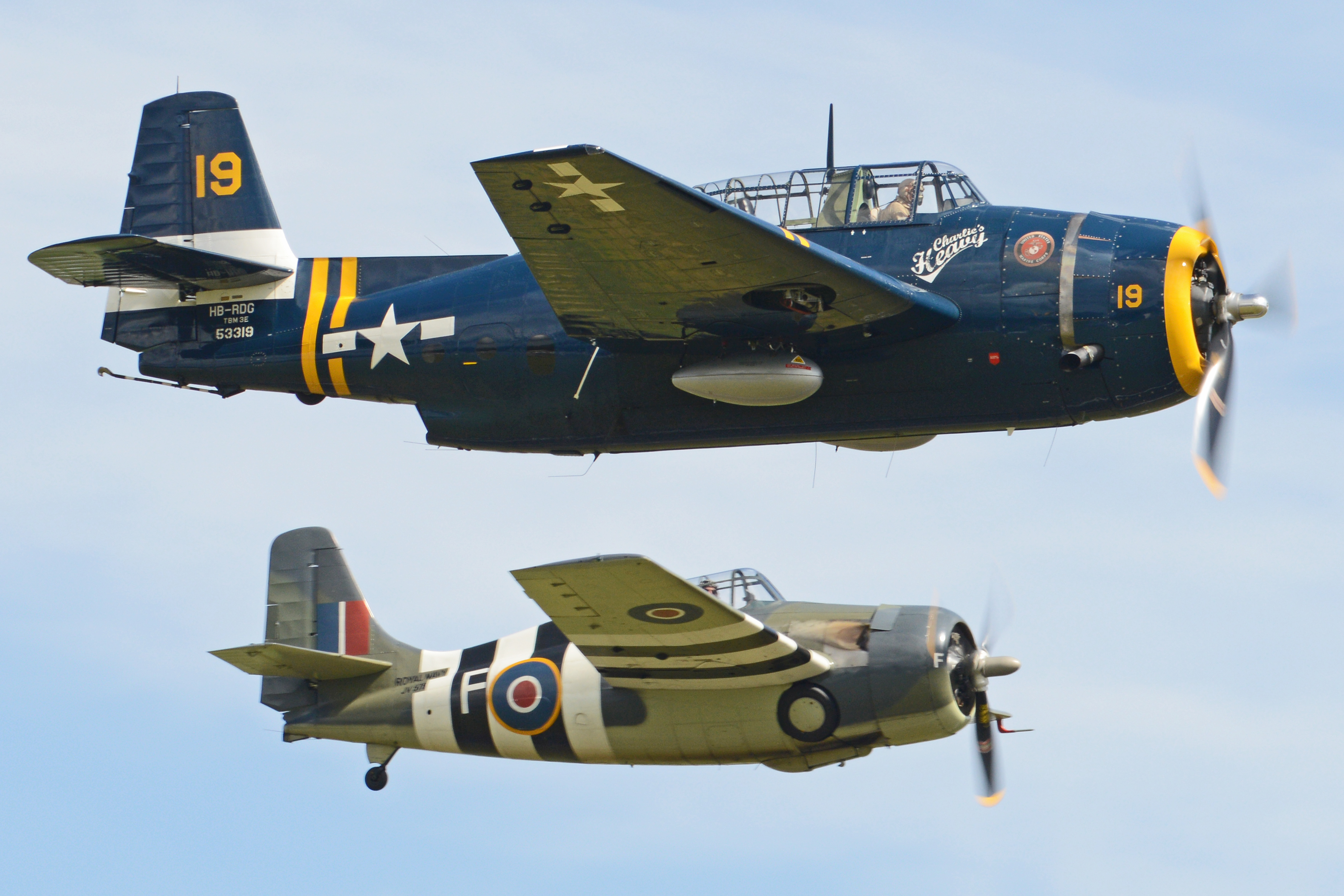
The two planes manufactured by Eastern and their two principal users: a US Navy TBM Avenger and a Fleet Air Arm FM-2 Wildcat in flight.

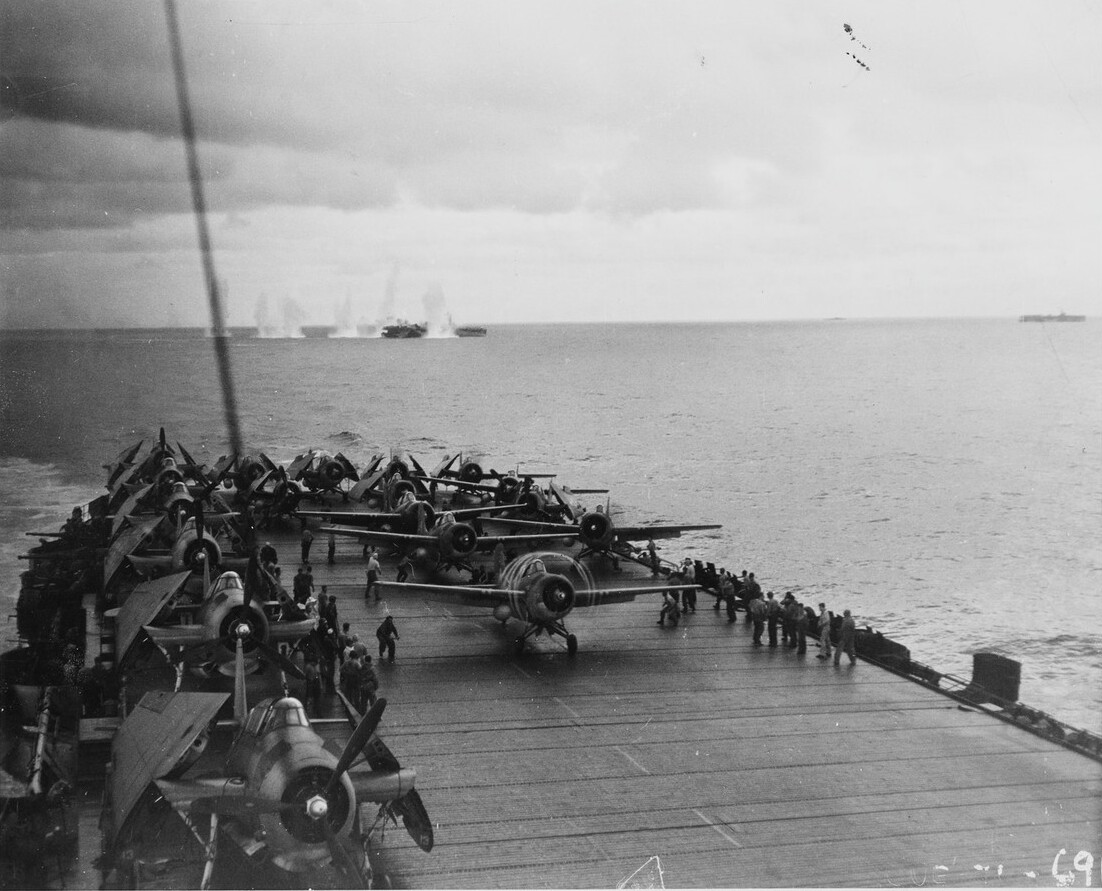
TBM Avengers and F4F Wildcats on the deck of the escort carrier USS Kitkun Bay (CVE-71) during the Battle off Samar on 25 October 1944.

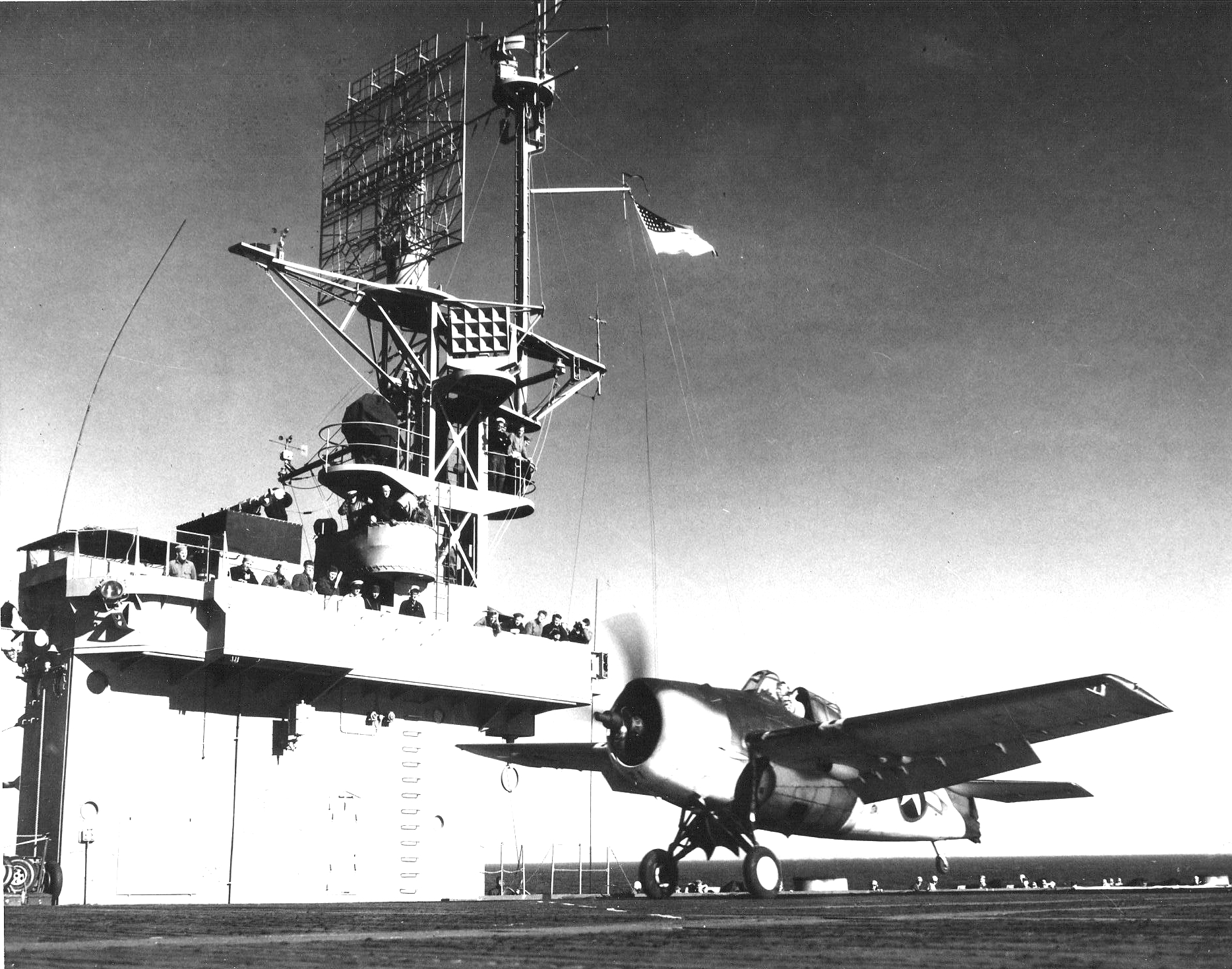
FM-1 Wildcat taking of from USS Kasaan Bay (CVE-69) in 1944.

The Eastern Aircraft Division was formed by the General Motors Corporation (GM) for the duration of the Second World War, to manufacture Grumman's F4F Wildcat and TBM Avenger carrier-based aircraft under license. The division comprised five plants on the East Coast of the United States, which, since the declaration of war in December 1941, had had to cease production of automobiles or car components. (Note: On December 11, 1941, the Office of Production Management issued a curtailment order on automobile production)

Created in January 1942, the new organization soon became operational. The aim was to manufacture two Grumman aircraft, so that the manufacturer could concentrate on assembling its new F6F Hellcat fighter.

The Navy (Note: "The Navy" here refers to the Navy department, which established the requirements for its two user services: the US Navy and the US Marine Corps. In practice, by the time the Eastern-built aircraft entered service, the Marines were no longer using the Wildcat as a front line fighter, but they would continue to operate the Avenger in combat until the end of the war.) assigned Eastern Aircraft the code M, so the F4F Wildcat fighter became the FM, and the TBF Avenger torpedo bomber became the TBM. (Note: For the Navy, the F4F was the fourth fighter model (F for fighting) developed by Grumman (F). The TBF – Grumman's first Torpedo Bomber (TB) – became General Motors' TBM. The first model was not given a number (FF at Grumman, FM at General Motors). Successive versions were identified by numbers (F4F-3, F4F-4 etc.) and sub-versions by letters (TBM-1C, TBM-1D etc.))

Eastern produced its first Wildcat in September 1942 and its first Avenger in November of the same year. Production increased rapidly, and Grumman was able to cease production of both models before the end of 1943.

By the end of the war, Eastern Aircraft Division had built nearly three quarters of the total number of Wildcat and Avenger aircraft produced during the Second World War. (Note: Sources differ for Wildcat production, particularly for the FM-1 model, but the overall proportion of 75 % of the total production remains correct for both models.) This represented a quarter of the total US wartime production of carrier-based combat aircraft.

== Background ==
During the years preceding the declaration of war, Congress voted several massive increases in the size of the American armed forces. On July 19, 1940, for example, the Two-Ocean Navy Act authorized construction of eight additional Essex-class aircraft carriers.

Following the attack on Pearl Harbor, the United States entered the war and all shipbuilding programs were accelerated (for example, USS Essex entered service in December 1942 instead of 1944). Emergency conversion programs were also implemented – both for existing ships and those under construction.

The need for shipborne aircraft, already high following the pre-war increases, rose sharply with the outbreak of hostilities. All the country's resources were mobilized, but demand was such that the existing factories could no longer meet it.

== The Navy's requirements and the manufacturers response ==
The aircraft manufacturers selected by the Navy therefore had to increase the capacity of their factories or establish new ones. But it was not enough: they needed to call on other aircraft manufacturers, or even of manufacturers active in other fields. For example, Vought, the builder of the F4U Corsair fighter, turned to Goodyear and Brewster – both established aircraft manufacturers – to subcontract part of the production of their fighter to them. The Goodyear version of the F4U was called FG and the Brewster-built version F3A. Curtiss did the same for its SB2C Helldiver, which was also manufactured by Canadian Car & Foundry Ltd as SBW and by Fairchild Canada as SBF.

In Grumman's case, the company needed to increase the production rate for its F4F Wildcat fighter and simultaneously put the TBF Avenger torpedo bomber into production. But it also needed to prepare for the launch of its new fighter: the F6F Hellcat, which the Navy has just selected to replace the F4F, and which had been given top priority.

Grumman – and the Navy – therefore turned to other manufacturers, including General Motors (GM), which was looking for work for its idle automobile plants.

Several actions took place simultaneously, both at the General Motors management level and at the plants level. The management of the Linden (New Jersey) plant contacted Grumman about the Avenger. During a subsequent meeting, the Linden representative realized, to his great surprise, that it wasn't just a question of supplying components or sub-assemblies, but of manufacturing the whole aircraft. A second surprise came up later: in subsequent contacts, the initial request changed again, with the idea now being to manufacture not just one, but two aircraft: the Avenger and the Wildcat.

General Motors was quick to react, forming a new division by grouping together several factories, a move which became official on January 21, 1942.

In response, the Navy confirmed its request with two letters of intent: on February 5 for the bomber manufacturing program, and on February 9 for the fighter program. These letters of intent were followed by two contracts dated March 23 and March 25 respectively.

== Setting up the Division ==
=== Challenges ===
For an automaker, the challenges were manifold, since making airplanes and cars are two different businesses. First of all, the products manufactured were different, with much more stringent weight and assembly precision requirements for aircraft. The materials – and therefore the assembly and welding techniques – were also different: mild steel for car bodies, duralumin, aluminum alloys and chromium-molybdenum for aircraft. Aircraft, flight controls (ailerons, control surfaces) are covered with fabric and equipments such as radios, flight instruments, self-protected fuel tanks, armor and weapons are highly specific. The only activity that could be transferred easily was upholstery.

Work organization was also different. Manufacturing of cars is a high-volume production business, where each job is ultra-specialized. Production changes are infrequent, whereas aircraft production runs are more limited, with more frequent – and usually very urgent – changes.

In addition to the problem of retraining GM workers, there was the problem of hiring new ones, which was exacerbated by the shortage of skilled workers in the aeronautical industry. The same applied to the search for suppliers and subcontractors, Grumman having made it clear that GM could not use theirs (the message – like the contract – was clear: "Find your own subcontractors!").

=== The plants ===
The new division comprised the following five plants, with the following work repartition:

- Bloomfield (New Jersey): this automotive battery manufacturing plant (Delco-Remy division) became a specialized center for the manufacture of the many sub-assemblies (wiring, tubing, hydraulics, electrical) incorporated in the two aircraft. It supplied the two final assembly plants in Linden and Trenton.
- Linden (New Jersey): originally a final assembly plant for Buick, Oldsmobile and Pontiac vehicles, it became the center responsible for manufacturing most of components of the FM fighter, then for its final assembly.
- Trenton (New Jersey): a plant specialized in the production of all internal accessories from door handles to window cranks (GM's Trenton-Ternstedt division), it became the center responsible for the manufacture of the central fuselage section of the TBM bomber, followed by its final assembly.
- Baltimore (Maryland): this body production plant (GM Fisher Body division – see also Baltimore Assembly) specialized in the manufacture of the TBM rear fuselage section (from the turret back), as well as the ailerons.
- Tarrytown (New York): this body production plant (Fisher Body division) becomes responsible for manufacturing the TBM's wings and front fuselage.

Major work was immediately undertaken: dismantling of assembly lines, conveyors, ovens, machine tools and hydraulic presses, storage for preservation purposes, and reorganization of work areas. In the case of the Linden plant, the entire roof had to be raised by 26 feet (7.9 m). For each of the two final assembly plants, a complete airfield with runway and control tower was created.

Subsequently, the ramp-up of manufacturing programs necessitated numerous extensions to the premises, either by constructing new buildings or by reclaiming other premises from adjoining plants. At the same time, the need to recruit new staff led to a sharp rise in the number of employees. By the end of 1942, for example, the Eastern Aircraft division employed 22,848 people, double the maximum workforce of the five plants prior to its creation.

=== Launching the program ===
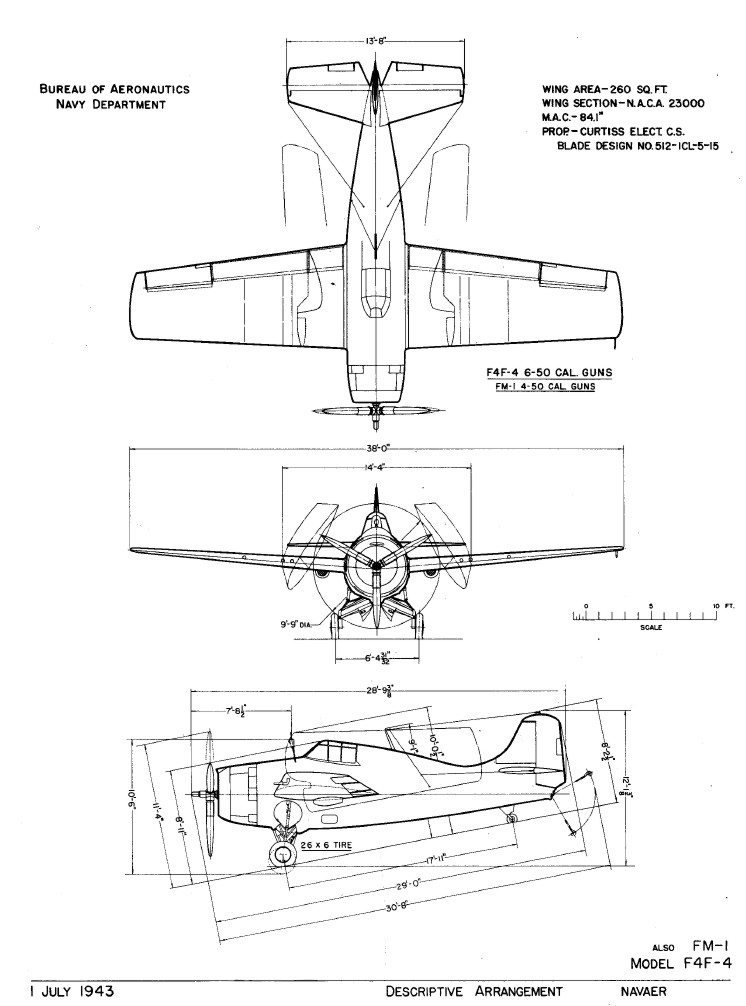
A three view drawing of F4F-4.

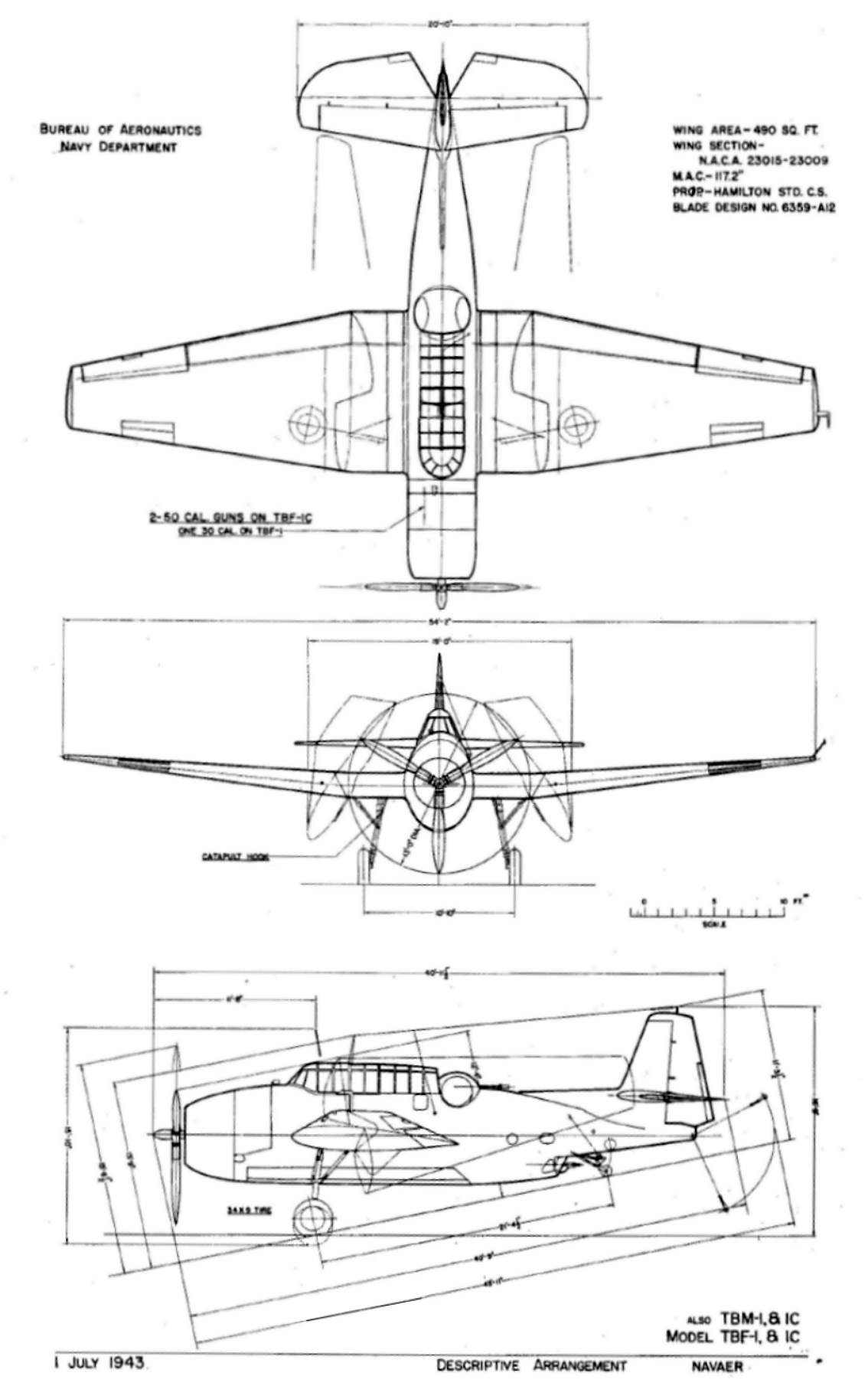
A three view drawing of the Avenger.

Eastern set up numerous training programs, either in-house or with the help of local schools. The needs were immense. For example, every welder needed to be Navy-qualified, and received a personal number and a personal steel stamp to mark each weld for traceability and quality control. For managers, general aeronautics courses were supplemented by management training programs, in partnership with East Coast universities (Johns Hopkins University, New York University, Rutgers University) and the General Motors Institute. Training courses were also organized with other manufacturers, as in the case of the Baltimore employees who went to Goodyear (also a Grumman subcontractor) to learn how to cover flight controls with fabric.

Eastern employees sent to Grumman discovered manufacturing methods very different from their own. For example, Grumman was not equipped to produce the thousands of bills of materials, drawings and plans to which GM people were accustomed, and since the Navy required that the models manufactured by Grumman and Eastern be interchangeable – right down to the individual parts – they would have to draw up their own 1:1 scale plans of every part they needed, starting from the parts themselves (a process known as lofting, also used in shipbuilding). However, each of the aircraft they were to build consisted of 10,000 to 15,000 parts (exactly 10,963 on the F4F-4, as confirmed by Grumman).

It was agreed that, in order to help Eastern, Grumman would supply a complete model of each aircraft, plus ten additional aircraft called "PK ships" because they were assembled with Parker-Kalon screws instead of rivets, allowing them to be easily disassembled and reassembled for training purposes.

The first production aircraft would also be assembled from Grumman-supplied parts, but it was agreed that Eastern should take over very quickly.

The "clash of cultures" between two such different organizations inevitably produced some friction, but the two programs progressed rapidly and, in view of the results – and the recognized quality of the aircraft produced by Eastern – a relationship of trust based on mutual respect soon succeeded to the initial difficulties. In fact, as the two ranges evolved, Eastern took full responsibility for industrialization and aircraft production, with Grumman content to develop prototypes.

== The planes ==
=== FM Wildcat ===
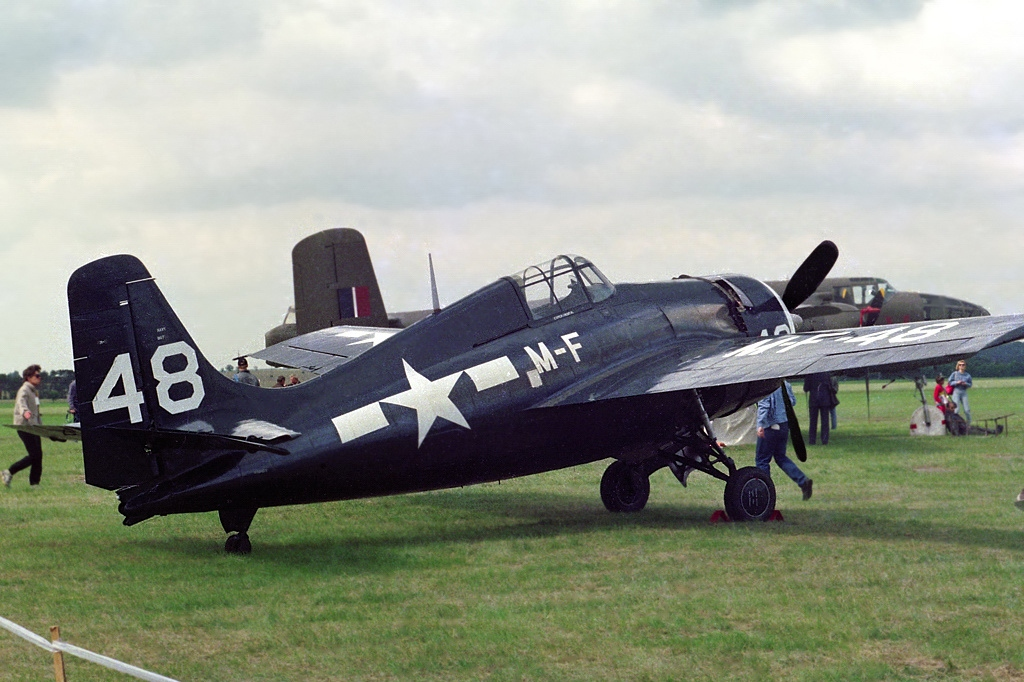
An FM-2 Wildcat recognizable by its large tail

The version initially produced under the name FM-1 was virtually a carbon copy of the last F4F-4 model, which had entered service in 1942. The most notable difference was the return, starting with the eleventh model produced, to a battery of four 50-caliber (12.7 mm) machine guns (instead of six), as insisted upon by American pilots. (Note: On the F4F-4, which replaced the F4F-3 from early 1942, the number of machine guns was increased from four to six. But this increase in firepower came at a price: the number of rounds of ammunition on board dropped from 1,800 to 1,440 (i.e. from 450 rounds per gun on the -3 to 240 on the -4, representing a loss of at least 5 seconds of fire – or almost 50%, a huge difference in aerial combat). Furthermore, the addition of two machine guns also increased the weight of the airplane, to the detriment of its performance. The need to standardize production on the six-gun configuration demanded by the British had prevented any backtracking on the -4, but the Navy finally won its case for the FM-1.)

The Wildcat was gradually withdrawn from front-line service, but as it took up less space than the Hellcat and Corsair, its use was favored on escort aircraft carriers, mass production of which was accelerated (Note: The United States launched a total of 125 escort carriers (including ships commissioned after the end of the war). Of these, 87 were commissioned by the US Navy and 38 were transferred to the Royal Navy (in addition to the 6 produced in the UK).) and demand remained high until the end of the war.

Eastern Aircraft delivered the first 23 machines in 1942, and by the time production ceased in September 1943, had delivered a total of 1134 FM-1s (829 for the US Navy and 311 for the British Fleet Air Arm).

In 1943, Eastern began production of the latest version of the Wildcat, the FM-2. Based on Grumman's XF4F-8 prototype, the "Wilder" Wildcat, as it was nicknamed, was significantly lightened and fitted with a more powerful Wright R-1820-56 and 56A (or 56W and 56WA with water injection) engine, with extended fin and rudder to handle the increased engine torque. During production, the FM-2 was also fitted with under-wing rocket launcher mounts.

When production ceased in May 1945, a total of 4777 FM-2s had been produced for the United States and British navies.

In the Royal Navy, the Wildcat – produced by Grumman or Eastern – had been renamed "Martlet", but this name was dropped in early 1944. FM-1s (formerly Martlet Mark Vs) became Wildcat Mark Vs and FM-2s (formerly Martlet Mark VIs) became Wildcat Mark VIs.

=== TBM Avenger ===
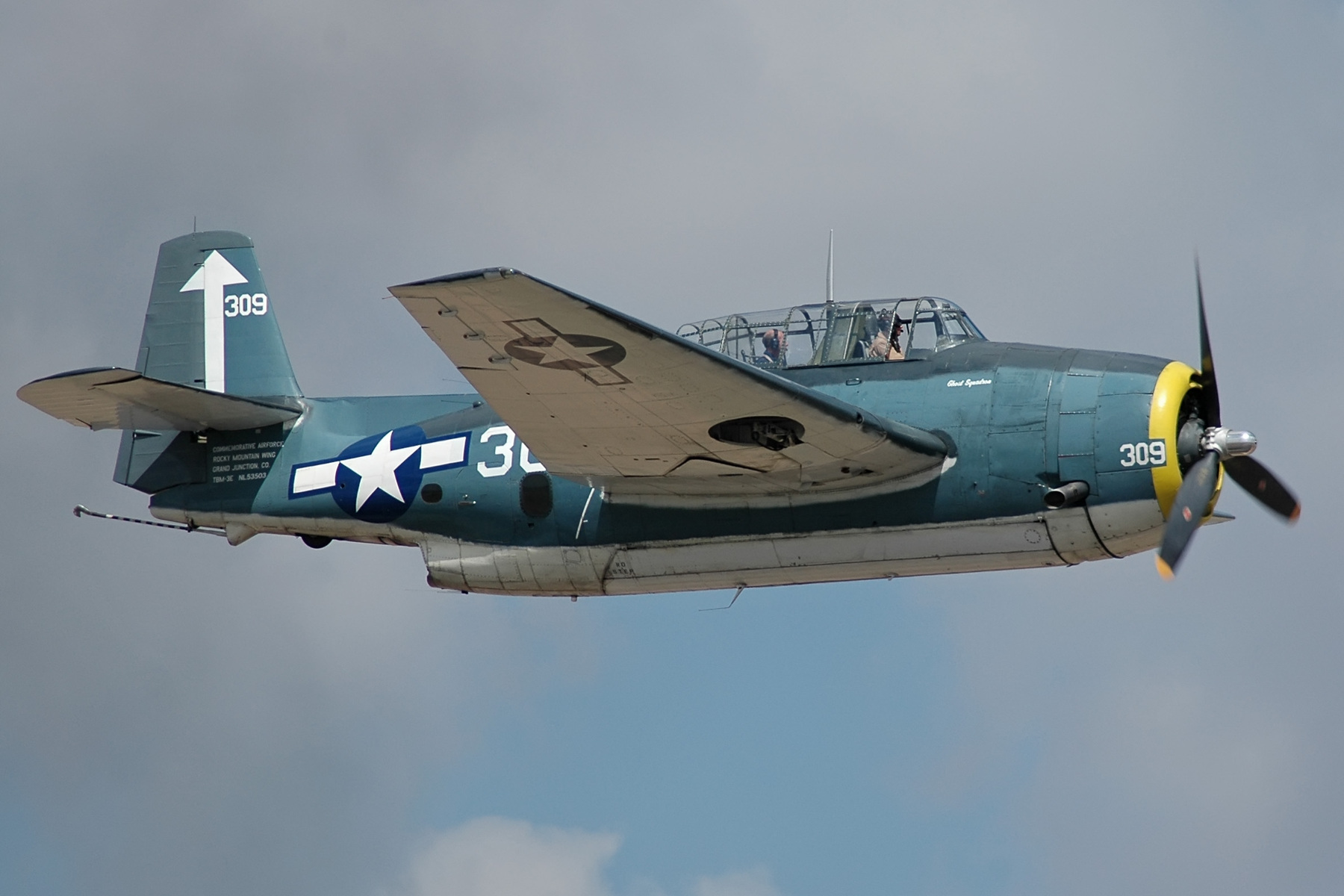
Eastern TBM-3E Avenger.

The first versions of the Avenger produced by Eastern, called TBM-1, were virtually identical to the TBF-1 produced by Grumman.

Eastern delivered the first model – assembled from parts supplied by Grumman – in November 1942, followed by two more in December. Production increased steadily (75 in June 1943, 100 in July, 215 in November) until it reached 350 machines per month in 1945, with an all-time record of 400 machines produced in March 1945.

An improved version of the TBF-1/TBM-1 was produced simultaneously by Grumman and Eastern under the reference TBF-1C and TBM-1C. There were also derivative TBF-1D/TBM-1D versions with a radar pod attached to the right wing for night operations.

As Eastern's production ramped up, Grumman finally ceased production of the TBF in December 1943, after assembling a total of 2,291 units.

For the next model, the TBF-3, Grumman supplied two XTBF-3 prototypes, but Eastern took over production under the reference TBM-3. This was the most produced version, with over 4,000 units manufactured.

Finally, Eastern also developed the last wartime version of the Avenger. This was a lighter version of the TBM-3, which went into production at the end of 1944 under the name TBM-3E.

Although the Avenger was less used as a torpedo bomber towards the end of the war, it remained widely used for horizontal or glide bombing and for anti-submarine patrols – on both fleet and escort carriers.

Eastern thus became sole supplier, producing a total of 7,546 TBMs, or 77% of total Avenger production during the Second World War.

In the Royal Navy, the Avenger – produced by Grumman or Eastern – had been renamed "Tarpon", but this name was dropped in early 1944. TBM-1s (formerly Tarpon Mark II) became Avenger Mark IIs and TBM-3s (formerly Tarpon Mark III) became Avenger Mark IIIs.

Production ceased definitively in September 1945, but the TBM-3 and TBM-3E versions served as the basis for numerous variants subsequently developed by Grumman: TBM-3R, -3S, -3W etc. (Note: These machines retained the TBM designation, but all these modifications were developed by Grumman and are therefore outside the scope of this article.)

== Other projects ==
=== TBM-4 ===
This version of the Avenger featured structural improvements and simplifications (reinforced center section, improved wing folding system, etc.). The first order, for 141 examples, was cancelled at the end of the conflict.

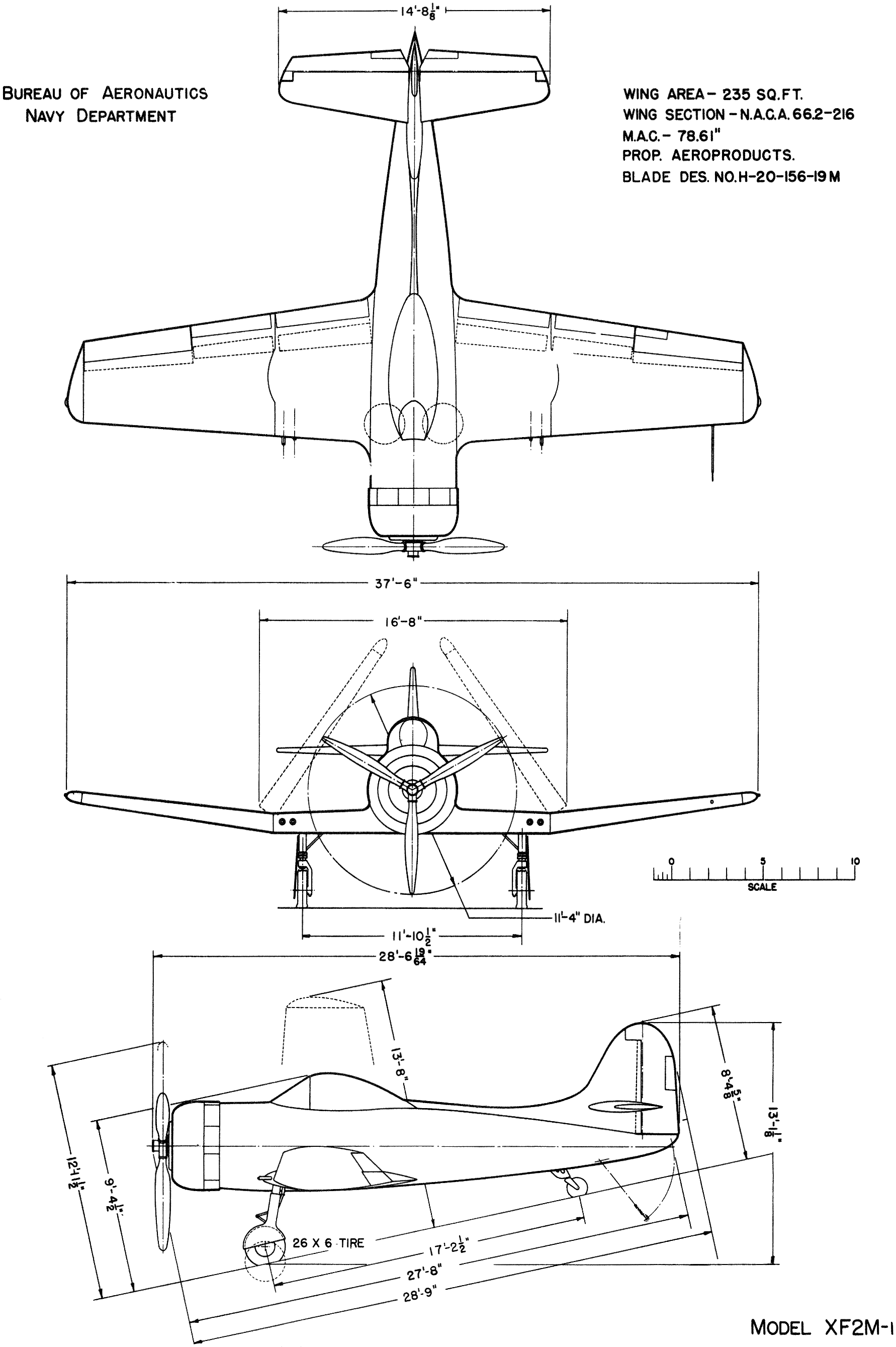
The proposed XF2M-1.

=== F2M-1 ===
Little information is available on this project. It appears to be a development of the FM, equipped with a more powerful XR-1820-70 engine, a bubble canopy and – according to some of the few drawings available – a different, wing-mounted landing gear. The attribution of the reference F2M, rather than FM-3, suggests a new model rather than a simple evolution. It seems that the project was cancelled even before a prototype was built. (Note: See for example Gustin (n.d.))

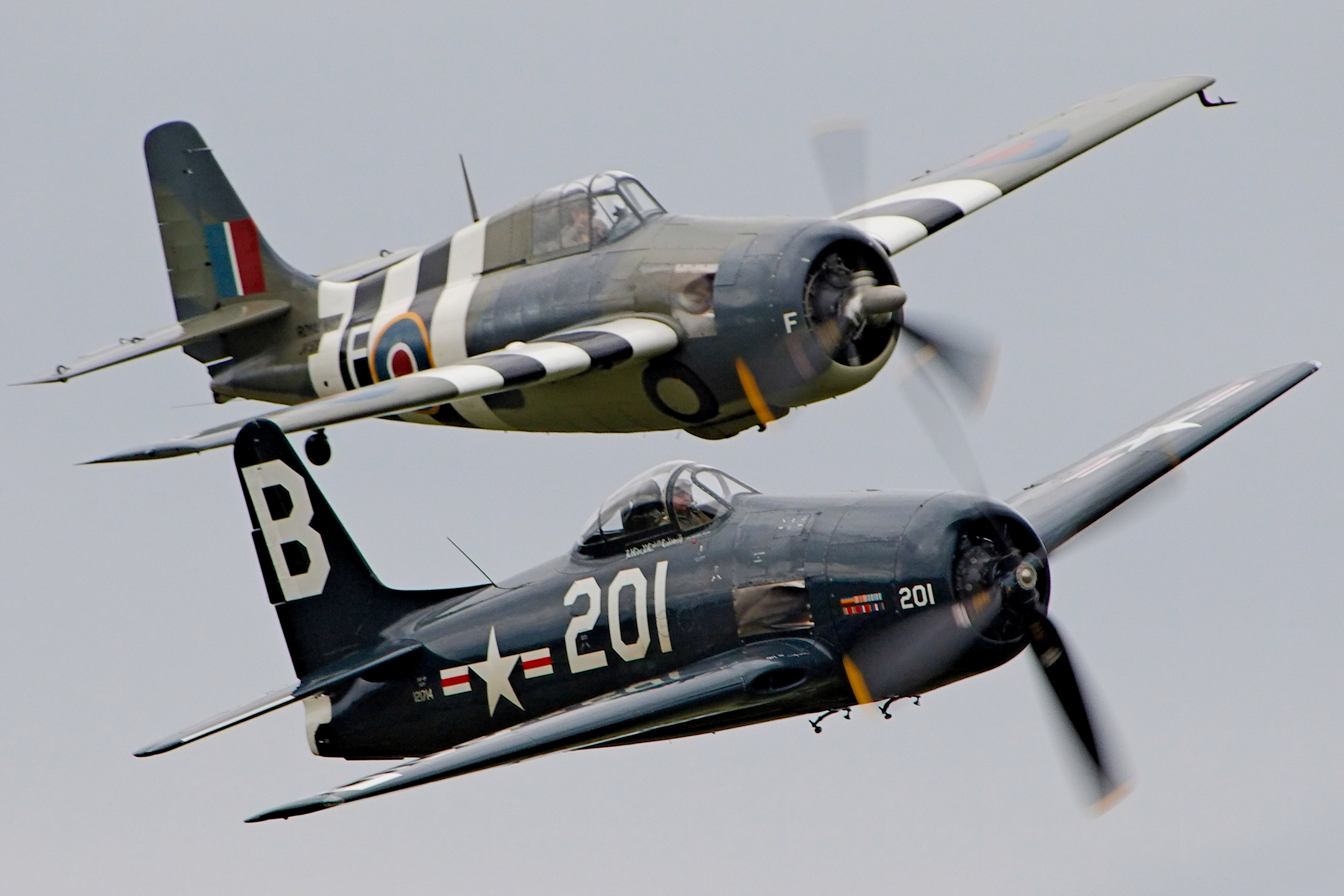
An F8F Bearcat and an F4F Wildcat flying in formation.

=== F3M-1 Bearcat ===
To replace the Wildcat and Hellcat, Grumman developed the F8F Bearcat, a lighter fighter powered by a Pratt & Whitney R-2800 engine, for which the company received its first order of 2,000 in 1944. On February 5, 1945, Eastern also received an initial order for the parallel production of 1,876 examples of its own version, called the F3M-1, at its Linden plant.

With the end of the war, Grumman's order was sharply reduced, but Eastern's order was entirely cancelled in August 1945.

== The end of the program ==
=== The end of production ===
The last machines were produced in September 1945. The timetable for the end of activity of the division and its factories is not known (Note: The book used as the main reference for this article, A History of Eastern Aircraft Division, was published in 1944, before the end of the war...)

=== Assessment ===
Even on the scale of the emergency programs put in place during the war, Eastern's creation and subsequent growth, as well as the volume of production generated in two and a half years, are impressive: Eastern produced 25% of the total number of carrier-based combat aircraft delivered by the United States to the US and Allied navies during the conflict, including 76% of all torpedo planes and 18% of all fighters. Around 9% of the production of both models was delivered to the British Royal Navy. (Note: 651 FM-1 and -2, or over 11% of the total production at the Linden plant, and 756 TBM-1 and -3, or almost 7.5% of the total production at the Trenton plant.)

The following table compares the main production programs for naval shipborne fighters.

Table of Navy Aircraft Produced by Builder and Type
Aircraft	Spec. Model	Builder	Fighters	Torpedo bombers	Dive bombers	Total	Eastern share
F6F Hellcat	F6F	Grumman	12272	—N/a	—N/a	12272	—N/a
F4U Corsair	F4U-1 – F4U-4	Chance Vought	6893	—N/a	—N/a	11634 (Note: This total excludes aircraft built after the end of the war (F4U-5, AU-1, F4U-7))	—N/a
F4U Corsair	FG-1 – FG-1D	Goodyear	4006	—N/a	—N/a	11634	—N/a
F4U Corsair	F3A-1, F3A-1A	Brewster	735	—N/a	—N/a	11634	—N/a
F4F Wildcat	FM	Eastern	5837	—N/a	—N/a	7724	76%
F4F Wildcat	F4F (Note: and variants : G36, Martlet etc.)	Grumman	1887	—N/a	—N/a	7724	76%
TBF Avenger	TBM	Eastern	—N/a	7546	—N/a	9837	77%
TBF Avenger	TBF	Grumman	—N/a	2291	—N/a	9837	77%
SB2C Helldiver	SB2C	Curtiss	—N/a	—N/a	5106 (Note: This number does not include 900 machines produced by Curtiss under the reference A25 for the USAAF.)	6240	—N/a
SB2C Helldiver	SBW	CC&F	—N/a	—N/a	834	6240	—N/a
SB2C Helldiver	SBF	Fairchild Canada	—N/a	—N/a	300	6240	—N/a
SBD Dauntless	SBD	Douglas	—N/a	—N/a	4983 (Note: SBD-1 to -6, not including the 953 A-24s produced for the USAAF)	4983	—N/a
Total Produced, by aircraft type			31630	9837	11223	52690	
Total Aircraft Produced by Eastern			5837	7546	0	13383 (Note: Depending on the source, the total varies by around a hundred machines.)	
Eastern Share of Production, by aircraft type			18%	77%	—N/a	25%	

== Notes and references ==
=== References ===
- Dann, Richard (2004). F4F Wildcat In Action – Aircraft Number 191. Carrollton, Texas: Squadron/Signal Publications. ISBN 0-89747-469-4.
- Doyle, David (2012). TBF/TBM Avenger In Action – 10225. Carrollton, Texas: Squadron/Signal Publications.
- General Motors Corporation [GMC] (1944). A History of Eastern Aircraft Division. Eastern Aircraft Division.
- Linn, Don (1988). F4F Wildcat In Action – Aircraft Number 84. Carrollton, Texas: Squadron/Signal Publications. ISBN 0-89747-200-4.
- Millot, Bernard; Nicolaou, Stéphane (1993). Les Avions Grumman 1929–1989 [Grumman Aircraft 1929–1989]. Docavia (in French). Vol. 35. Editions Larivière. ISBN 2-907051-03-2.
- Gustin, Emmanuel (n.d.). "Grumman F4F Wildcat". Archived from the original on August 1, 2020.
- Tillman, Barrett (1979). Avenger at War. London: Ian Allan. ISBN 0-7110-0957-0.
- Tillman, Barrett (1990). Wildcat: The F4F in World War II (2nd ed.). Annapolis, Maryland: Naval Institute Press. ISBN 1-55750-819-4.
- Scrivner, Charles L. (1987). TBM/TBF Avenger In Action – Aircraft Number 82. Carrollton, Texas: Squadron/Signal Publications. ISBN 0-89747-197-0.
- Scrivner, Charles L. (1990). F8F Bearcat In Action – Aircraft Number 99. Carrollton, Texas: Squadron/Signal Publications.
- Stern, Robert (1982). SB2C Helldiver In Action – Aircraft Number 54. Carrollton, Texas: Squadron/Signal Publications.

== See also ==
- Grumman
- Grumman F4F Wildcat
- Grumman TBF Avenger
- Naval aviation
- Carrier aircraft used during World War II
