= Grumman F4F Wildcat =

United States Navy World War II era fighter plane

F4F/FM/F2M Wildcat/Martlet
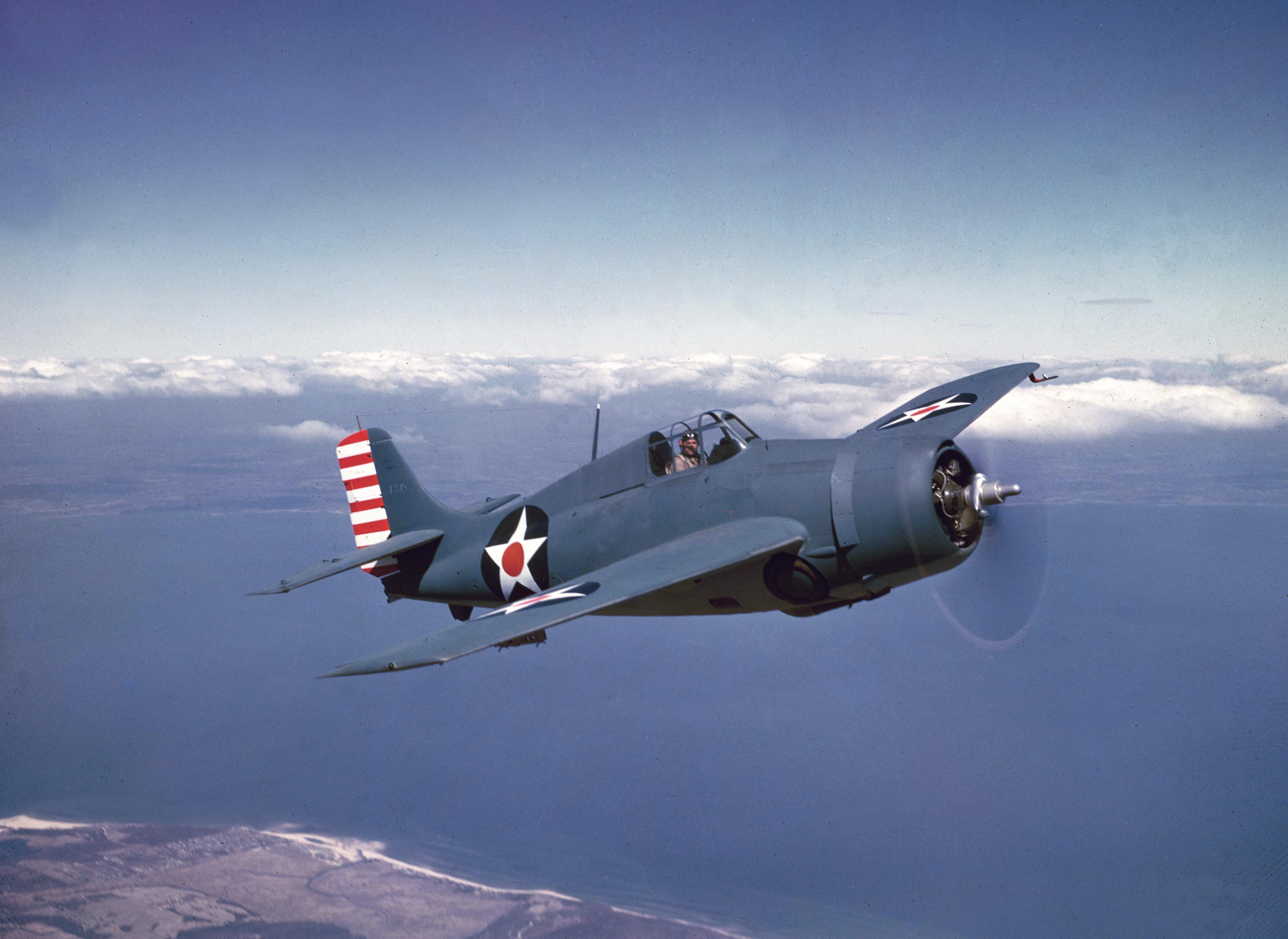
- F4F-3 in non-reflective blue-gray over light gray scheme from early 1942

General information
- Type: Carrier-based fighter aircraft
- National origin: United States
- Manufacturer: Grumman
- Built by: GM Eastern Aircraft Division
- Status: Retired from military use
- Primary users: United States Navy United States Marine Corps; Royal Navy; Royal Canadian Navy
- Number built: 7,885

History
- Introduction date: December 1940
- First flight: 2 September 1937
- Retired: 1945

The Grumman F4F Wildcat is an American carrier-based fighter aircraft that entered service in 1940 with the United States Navy and the British Royal Navy. The British made the first use of the type in combat, initially as a base-defense fighter; later they operated it from escort carriers in the North Atlantic, and later still from fleet carriers, under the name Martlet. By the time of Pearl Harbor the Wildcat was the best fighter available to the United States Navy and Marine Corps, and remained so until mid-1943. The disappointing Brewster F2A Buffalo remained in limited front-line and second-line service through much of 1942, but was withdrawn as soon as enough Wildcats became available.

In the Pacific, Wildcats found themselves matched against various marks of the Mitsubishi A6M Zero. US Navy pilots were reasonably satisfied with the F4F-3 model of the Wildcat, with which they fought through May 1942 and the Battle of the Coral Sea, but were initially much less satisfied with the "improved" F4F-4, which first engaged the Zero at Midway. This mark suffered from increased weight, resulting mainly from the addition of folding wings and a heavier gun battery, without any increase in engine power; this left the F4F-4 with a more sluggish performance than its predecessor. Improved tactics, based on close mutual support by fighters operating as a unit, helped reduce the consequences of reduced performance, and later models (which entered service after the type had been withdrawn from front-line service) were given reduced gun batteries and upgraded engines, giving them better performance in their reduced roles. In the final tally Wildcat pilots claimed an air combat kill-to-loss ratio of 5.9:1 for 1942 and 6.9:1 for the war as a whole.

In the spring of 1942, lessons learned from early Wildcat combat operations were applied, at the last minute, to prototypes of Grumman's vastly superior F6F Hellcat, the design of which already owed a great deal to the Wildcat. While the Wildcat had better range and maneuverability at low speed, the Hellcat, with c. 50 percent greater power available, could easily outperform the Zero, and superseded the Wildcat in front-line service in 1943-44.

From mid-1942 onward production of the Wildcat was subcontracted to a new division of General Motors, the Eastern Aircraft Division, which was established specifically to produce other firms' aircraft, and which ultimately did produce more than three-quarters of all the Wildcats and Avengers that were built.

== Design and development ==
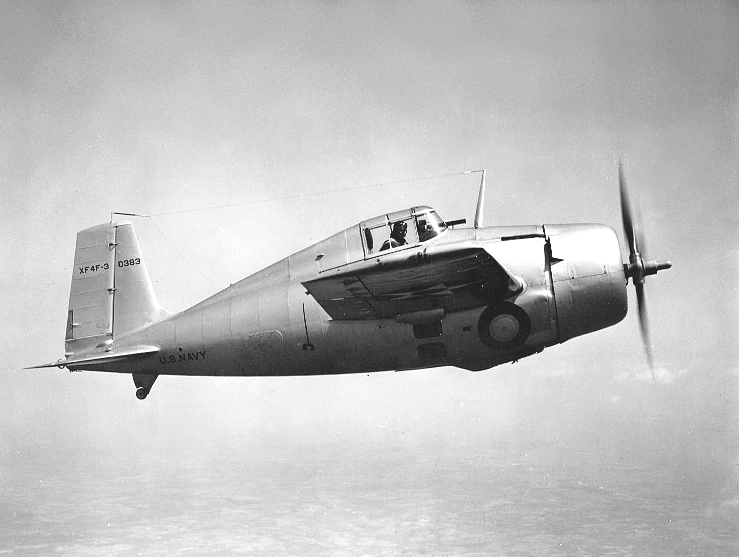
The XF4F-3 in 1939; it was written off in a fatal accident on 16 December 1940

Grumman fighter development began with the two-seat Grumman FF biplane. The FF was the first U.S. naval fighter with a retractable landing gear. The wheels retracted into the fuselage, leaving the tires visibly exposed, flush with the sides of the fuselage. Two single-seat biplane designs followed, the F2F and F3F, which established the general fuselage outlines of what would become the F4F Wildcat. In 1935, while the F3F was still undergoing flight testing, Grumman started work on its next biplane fighter, the G-16. At the time, the U.S. Navy favored a monoplane design, the Brewster F2A-1, ordering production early in 1936. However, an order was also placed for Grumman's G-16 (given the navy designation XF4F-1) as a backup in case the Brewster monoplane proved to be unsatisfactory.

It was clear to Grumman that the XF4F-1 would be inferior to the Brewster monoplane, so Grumman abandoned the XF4F-1, designing instead a new monoplane fighter, the XF4F-2. The XF4F-2 would retain the same, fuselage-mounted, hand-cranked main landing gear as the F3F, with its relatively narrow track. The unusual manually-retractable main landing gear design for all of Grumman's U.S. Navy fighters up to and through the F4F, as well as for the amphibious Grumman J2F utility biplane, was originally created in the 1920s by Leroy Grumman for Grover Loening. (Note: Quote: ...landing gear was almost identical to that in the J2F's.) Landing accidents caused by failure of the main gear to fully lock into place were distressingly common.

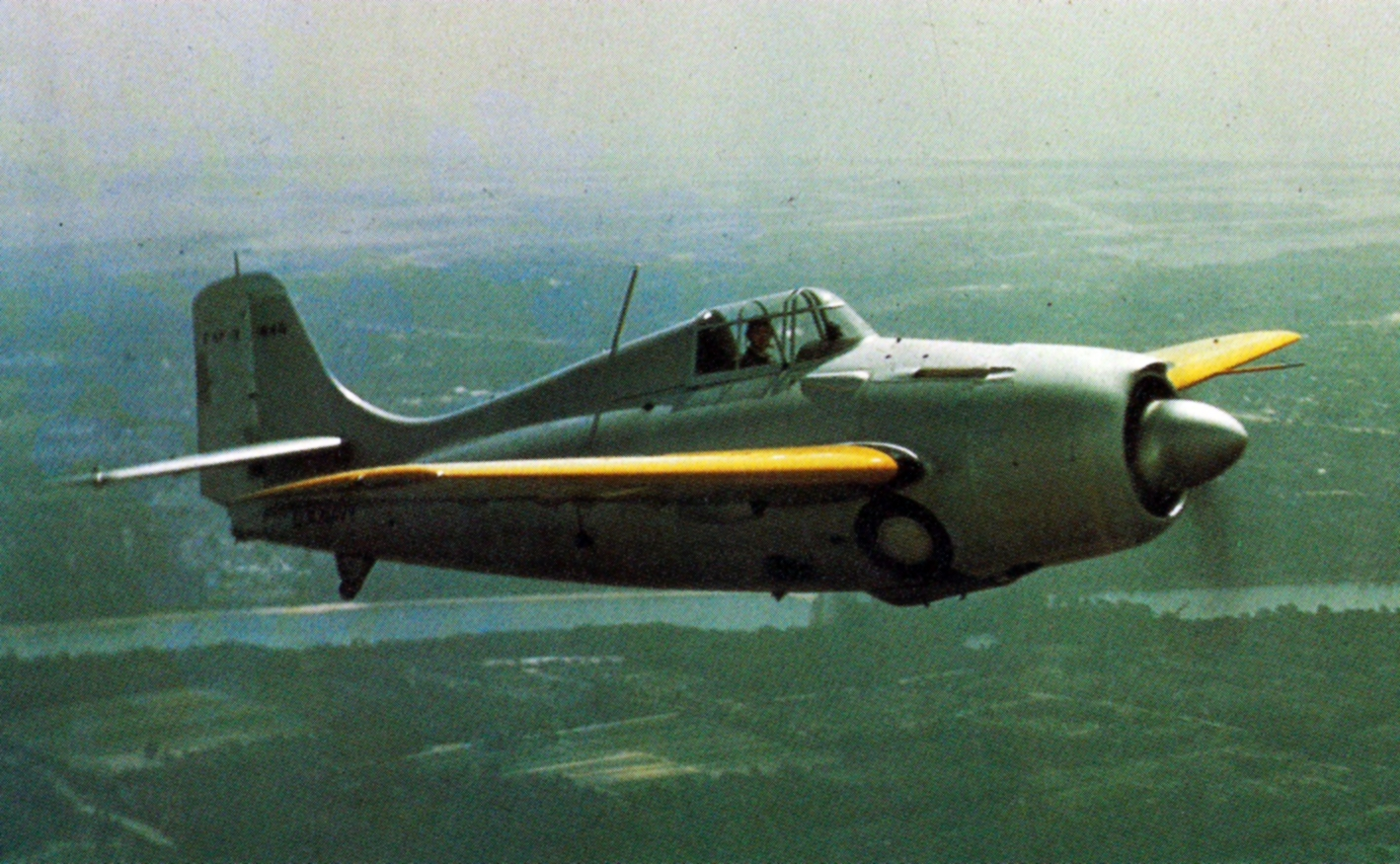
An early F4F-3 with prop spinner and cowling guns

The overall performance of Grumman's new monoplane was felt to be inferior to that of the Brewster Buffalo. The XF4F-2 was marginally faster, but the Buffalo was more maneuverable. The Buffalo was judged superior and was chosen for production. After losing out to Brewster, Grumman completely rebuilt the prototype as the XF4F-3 with new wings and tail and a supercharged version of the Pratt & Whitney R-1830 "Twin Wasp" radial engine. Testing of the new XF4F-3 led to an order for F4F-3 production models, the first of which was completed in February 1940. France also ordered the type, powered by a Wright R-1820 "Cyclone 9" radial engine, but France fell to the Axis powers before they could be delivered and the aircraft went instead to the British Royal Navy, who christened the new fighter the Martlet. The U.S. Navy officially adopted the aircraft type on 1 October 1941 as the Wildcat. The Royal Navy's and U.S. Navy's F4F-3s, armed with four .50 in (12.7 mm) Browning machine guns, joined active units in 1940.

On 16 December 1940, the XF4F-3 prototype, BuNo 0383, c/n 356, modified from XF4F-2, was lost under circumstances that suggested that the pilot may have been confused by the poor layout of fuel valves and flap controls and inadvertently turned the fuel valve to "off" immediately after takeoff rather than selecting flaps "up". This was the first fatality in the type.

== Operational history ==
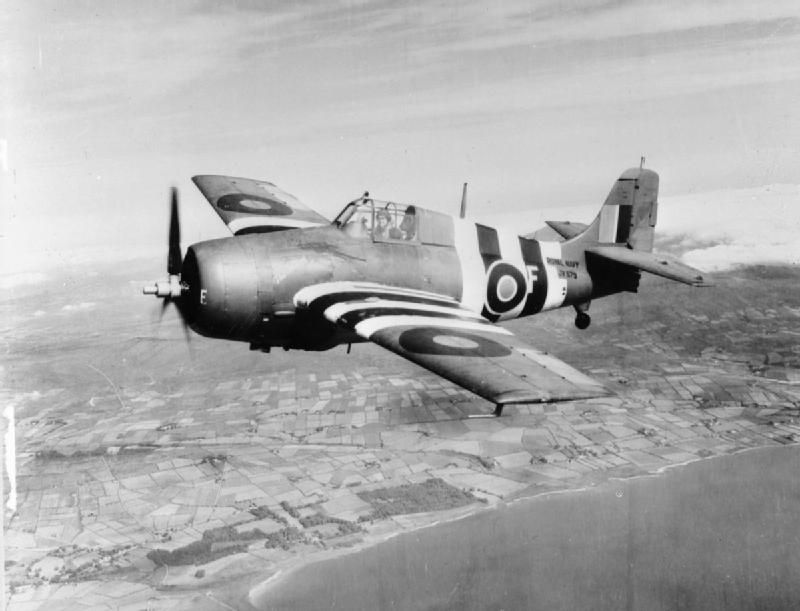
A Fleet Air Arm Wildcat in 1944, showing "invasion stripes"

Even before the Wildcat had been purchased by the U.S. Navy, the French Navy's Aeronavale and the Royal Navy's Fleet Air Arm (FAA) had ordered the Wildcat, with their own configurations, via the Anglo-French Purchasing Board.

=== Royal Navy ===
The Martlet was taken on by the FAA as a single-seat, high-performance fighter to supplement the Fairey Fulmar in carrier service. The Fulmar was a two-seat fighter with good range, but it operated at a performance disadvantage against single-seat fighters. The Royal Navy decided it needed single-seat fighters to go with their two-seaters, but because, in 1940, every modern single-seater that could be produced domestically (Hawker Hurricanes and Supermarine Spitfires) was needed by the Royal Air Force. for service against German bombers, the Grumman plane was adopted by the Fleet Air Arm as soon as it became available. The first types received, the Martlet I and Martlet II, were aircraft diverted from French and Greek orders after those countries were overrun by the Axis powers in 1940 and 1941, respectively. Martlet Is were used for training and the defense of naval bases, with the type's first combat victory coming on Christmas Day 1940, when a land-based Martlet destroyed a Junkers Ju 88 bomber over the Scapa Flow naval base. This was the first combat victory by a US-built fighter in British service in World War II.

The type also pioneered combat operations from escort carriers. Six Martlets went to sea aboard the very first operational escort carrier, the converted former German merchant vessel HMS Audacity, in September 1941, and shot down several Luftwaffe Fw 200 Condor bombers during highly effective convoy escort operations. These were the first of many Wildcats to engage in aerial combat at sea, including Convoy HG 76 to Gibraltar, in December 1941. In March 1945, Wildcats shot down four Messerschmitt Bf 109s over Norway, the FAA's last Wildcat victories.

The Martlet proved popular among prominent Fleet Air Arm pilots, in part because of oddly exaggerated perceptions of its performance, and also in part because it represented tangible evidence of American backing for the war effort. The pilots saw it as, if not a great naval fighter, at least a genuine one, designed by a company which understood what was needed; and, unlike most in the British Air Ministry (which was fixated on the power of 20-mm cannons), they were very pleased with the plane's Browning M2 heavy machine guns.

I would still assess the Wildcat as the outstanding naval fighter of the early years of World War II ... I can vouch as a matter of personal experience, this Grumman fighter was one of the finest shipboard aeroplanes ever created.

— Eric M. "Winkle" Brown, British test pilot

The last air raid of the war in Europe was carried out by Fleet Air Arm aircraft in Operation Judgement on 5 May 1945. Twenty-eight Wildcat VI aircraft from 846, 853 and 882 Naval Air Squadron, flying from escort carriers, took part in an attack on a U-boat depot near Harstad, Norway. Two ships and a U-boat were sunk with the loss of one Wildcat and one Grumman Avenger torpedo bomber.

=== US Navy and Marine Corps ===
==== Pacific ====
The first model of the Wildcat to see action with the U.S. Pacific Fleet was the F4F-3. This mark was generally well-received by American pilots although it did have teething pains: as delivered the type lacked pilot armor, self-sealing fuel tanks, and reflector gunsights, and its guns tended to jam; but all these defects were addressed by squadron mechanics, though not always before the planes saw action. Although it was slower in level flight, had a lower rate of climb, and was less maneuverable in those regimes than the Mitsubishi A6M2 Zero, its major opponent in the early part of the war, it was faster and more controllable in a dive, more sturdily built (even before armor was applied), and had a more effective gun battery. Four U.S. Marine Corps F4F-3s played a prominent role in the defense of Wake Island in December 1941, and seven other land-based examples operated off of Midway Island during the battle there in June 1942. Carrier-based F4F-3s served as the U.S. Navy's principal shipboard fighters from Pearl Harbor through the Battle of Coral Sea. Curiously, the F4F-3's reputation among its pilots benefitted from the fact that its pilots exaggerated its capabilities: experiences at Coral Sea left many pilots believing that the type's speed and climbing ability were equal to those of the Zero (things that were manifestly untrue), falling short only in maneuverability.

By the time of Midway the last F4F-3s based on Pacific Fleet carriers had been superseded by F4F-4s. This ostensibly improved model was equipped with folding wings (which allowed the size of fighter squadrons to be increased from 18 to 27) and two extra guns; but it was equipped with the same engine as the F4F-3, and the extra weight from the modifications contributed to a reduction in performance. U.S. Navy pilots were not pleased with the changes (which also included a reduction in the number of rounds per gun, and therefore a reduction in the length of time that firing could be sustained), and a general belief in the F4F-4s inferiority developed.

The solution to this crisis of confidence was to be found in technology and tactics. Regarding technology, during this period many U.S. Navy pilots were saved by the Wildcat's ZB (Zed Baker) homing device, an electronic beacon which allowed them to find their carriers in poor visibility, provided they could get within the 30 mi (48 km) range of the homing beacon. The system was far from foolproof; during the Battle of Midway 10 F4F-4s from Hornet's VF-8 crashed in the sea after failing to locate their carrier, even though the planes they had been escorting, for the most part, made it home.

As for tactics, one vocal critic of the F4F-4 was Lieutenant Commander John Thach, commander of Saratoga's fighter squadron, VF-3. In mid-1941, after reading Fleet Air Tactical Unit Intelligence Bureau reports describing the new Japanese fighter and concluding that the still-untried F4F would be no match for it, then-Lieutenant Thach devised a defensive tactic (later named the "Thach Weave" by fellow fighter pilot James Flatley) which called for friendly fighters in formation to maneuver in a coordinated manner to counter diving attacks. Thach used his tactic successfully at Midway. However, it took some time for the tactic to be disseminated widely, and as a result the most widely employed tactic used by American pilots during the Guadalcanal campaign was high-altitude ambush, in which pilots pre-positioned at relatively high altitudes used diving, hit-and-run maneuvers against enemy aircraft below, swooping in, gaining speed, and then, after firing, using that speed to climb back up to altitude and position themselves to attack again. The pre-positioning was made possible by a combination of coastwatchers and radar, which together served as an early warning system. The early warning system did not always deliver results. On 7 August 1942, the day of the Guadalcanal landings, while American carriers were the sole providers of air cover for the invasion force, USS Enterprise lost 10 F4F-4s and an SBD performing CAP duty to Rabaul-based Tainan Kōkūtai Zero fighters, in exchange for one Zero that was forced to crash-land later. These losses included US Fighter Ace James 'Pug' Southerland who was shot down by IJNAS ace Saburō Sakai (but survived--as did Sakai, who was severely injured later in the day, but brought his plane back to base). Later, on 2 October 1942, a Japanese air raid from Rabaul was not detected in time, and the Cactus Air Force lost six Wildcats to only one Zero destroyed. During the most intense initial phase of the Guadalcanal Campaign, between 1 August and 15 November, combat records indicate that US lost 115 Wildcats and Japanese lost 106 Zeros to all causes; the Japanese lost many more pilots compared to the US.

Even after his success at Midway Thach remained greatly dissatisfied with the F4F-4s performance at this and later battles, stating in his Midway action report

It is indeed surprising that any of our pilots returned alive. Any success our fighter pilots may have had against the Japanese Zero fighter is not due to the performance of the airplane we fly but is the result of the comparatively poor marksmanship of the Japanese, stupid mistakes made by a few of their pilots and superior marksmanship and team work of some of our pilots. The F4F airplane is pitifully inferior in climb, maneuverability and speed.

— John "Jimmy" Thach, Midway action report.

Nonetheless, it was not until 1943 that more advanced naval fighters capable of taking on the Zero on more even terms, the Grumman F6F Hellcat and Vought F4U Corsair, reached the South Pacific theater.

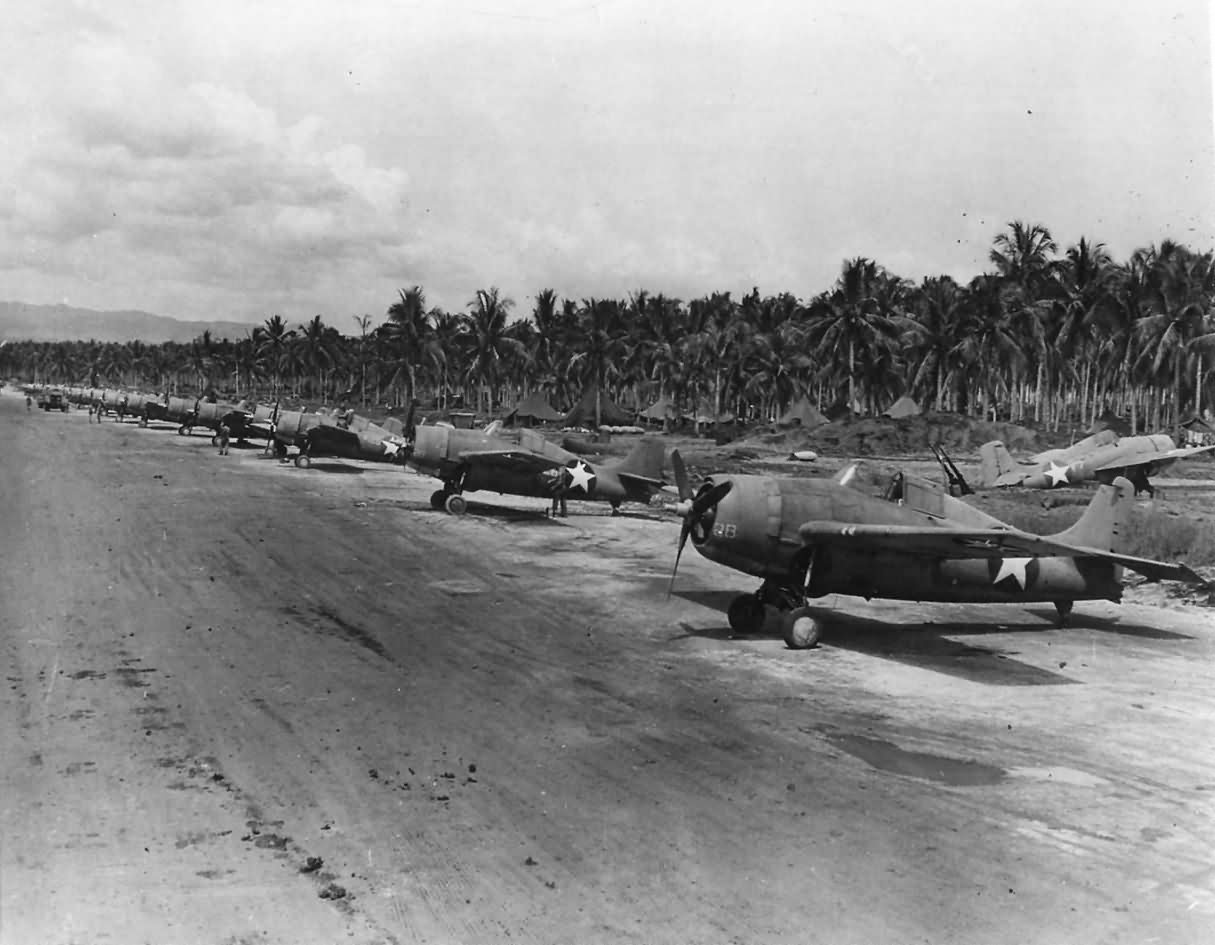
F4F-4s on Guadalcanal, 1942

Reflecting on his duel with "Pug" Southerland over Guadalcanal, the Japanese ace Saburō Sakai described the Wildcat's capacity to absorb damage:

I had full confidence in my ability to destroy the Grumman and decided to finish off the enemy fighter with only my 7.7 mm machine guns. I turned the 20 mm cannon switch to the "off" position, and closed in. For some strange reason, even after I had poured about five or six hundred rounds of ammunition directly into the Grumman, the airplane did not fall, but kept on flying. I thought this very odd—it had never happened before—and closed the distance between the two airplanes until I could almost reach out and touch the Grumman. To my surprise, the Grumman's rudder and tail were torn to shreds, looking like an old torn piece of rag. With his plane in such condition, no wonder the pilot was unable to continue fighting! A Zero which had taken that many bullets would have been a ball of fire by now.

— Saburo Sakai, Zero

Grumman's Wildcat production ceased in early 1943 to make way for the newer F6F Hellcat but General Motors continued producing Wildcats for U.S. Navy and Fleet Air Arm use. At first, GM produced the FM-1 (identical to the F4F-4 but with four guns). Production later switched to the improved FM-2 (based on Grumman's XF4F-8 prototype, informally known as the "Wilder Wildcat") optimized for small-carrier operations, with a more powerful engine and a taller tail to cope with the increased torque.

From 1943, Wildcats equipped with bomb racks were primarily assigned to escort carriers for use against submarines and ground targets, though they also continued to score kills against Japanese fighters, bombers, and kamikaze aircraft. Larger fighters such as the Hellcat and the Corsair and dive bombers were needed aboard fleet carriers and the Wildcat's slower landing speed made it more suitable for shorter flight decks.

In the Battle off Samar on 25 October 1944, escort carriers of Task Unit 77.4.3 ("Taffy 3") and their escort of destroyers and destroyer escorts found themselves as the sole force standing between vulnerable troop transport and supply ships engaged in landings on the Philippine island of Leyte and a powerful Japanese surface fleet of battleships and cruisers. In desperation, lightly armed Avengers and FM-2 Wildcats from Taffys 1, 2 and 3 resorted to tactics such as strafing ships, including the bridge of the Japanese battleship Yamato, while the destroyers and destroyer escorts attacked the Japanese surface force. This action contributed to buying enough time for Taffy 3's escort carriers to escape into a rain squall.

==== Atlantic ====
U.S. Navy Wildcats participated in Operation Torch. USN escort carriers in the Atlantic used Wildcats until the end of the war. In October 1943 F4Fs participated in Operation Leader, an anti-shipping strike on Norway.

=== Totals ===
In all, 7,860 Wildcats were built. (Note: 7,860 aircraft produced, starting in December, 1940) Nearly three-quarters of this total were built by the Eastern Aircraft Division of General Motors, which took over production in 1942. During the course of the war, Navy and Marine F4Fs and FMs flew 15,553 combat sorties (14,027 of these from aircraft carriers), destroying a claimed figure of 1,327 enemy aircraft at a cost of 178 aerial losses, 24 to ground/shipboard fire, and 49 to operational causes (an overall claimed kill-to-loss ratio of 6.9:1). True to their usual pure fighter role, Wildcats dropped only 154 tons of bombs during the war.

==== Medal of Honor recipients ====
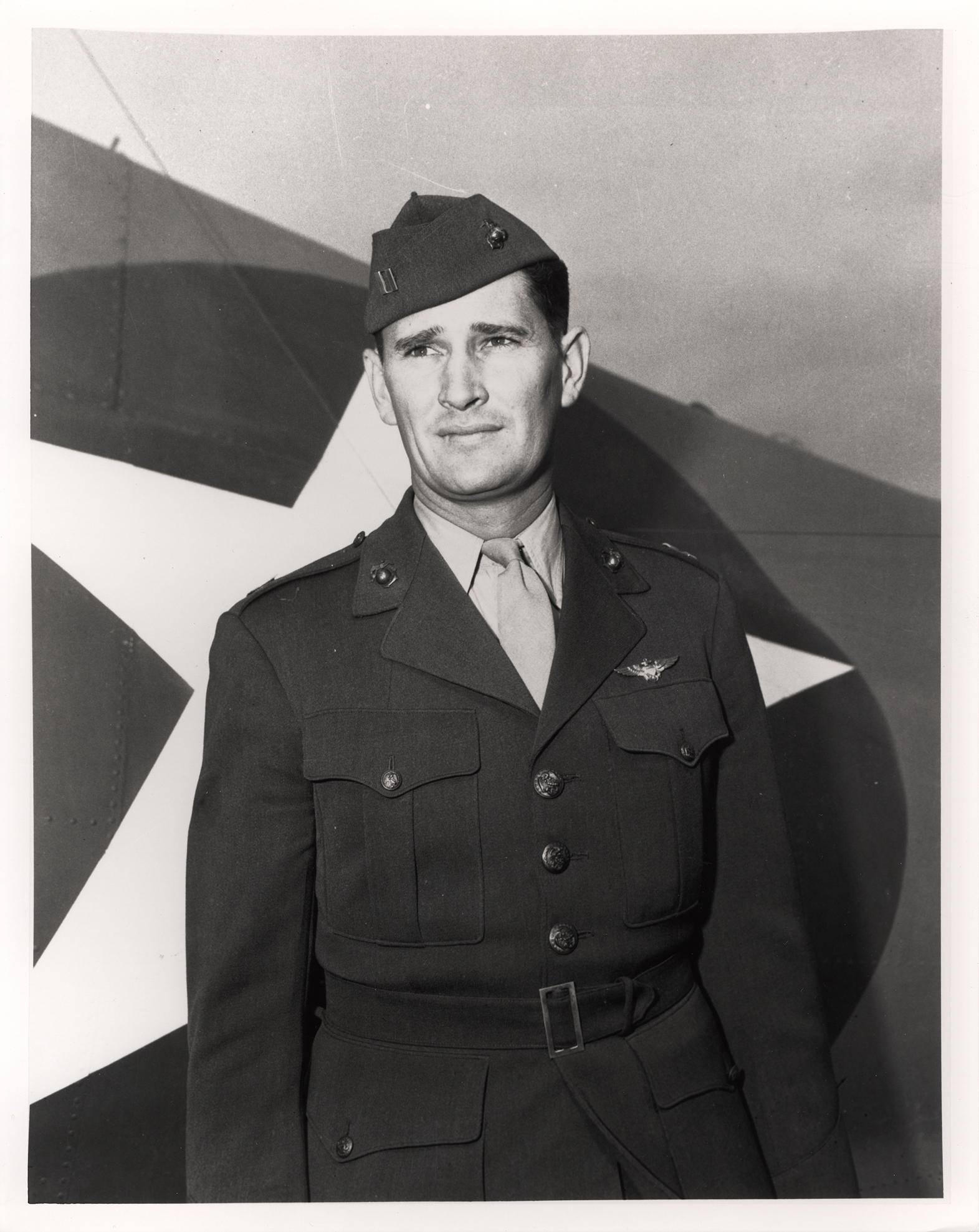
Joe Foss, Medal of Honor recipient and leading Marine Corps flying ace while flying F4F

Eight F4F pilots (including two posthumously) received the Medal of Honor during World War II:

- Lt Col. Harold W. Bauer of the Marine Fighting Squadron 212, was awarded the Medal of Honor posthumously for his actions in aerial combat in the South Pacific Area between May 10 and November 14, 1942. During operations over Guadalcanal, he led repeated engagements against Japanese bombers and fighters, often outnumbered more than two-to-one. He shot down multiple enemy aircraft in separate battles, including one bomber on 28 September and four fighters on 3 October. On October 16, while low on fuel and returning from a long ferry mission, he engaged enemy fighters attacking an American destroyer, helping defend the ship and shooting down four enemy planes before being forced to return Guadalcanal due to fuel shortage. He was killed in action on November 14, 1942.
- 1st Lt. Jefferson J. DeBlanc of the Marine Fighting Squadron 112 was awarded the Medal of Honor for his actions during aerial operations over Kolombangara Island in Solomon Islands on January 31, 1943. While leading a six-plane fighter escort protecting American dive bombers and torpedo aircraft attacking Japanese naval forces, DeBlanc engaged large numbers of Japanese fighters and floatplanes. Despite heavy opposition and dangerously low fuel, he shot down five enemy aircraft, becoming ace in a day, before bailing out of his badly damaged fighter out over enemy-held territory on Kolombangara, where he was rescued by the island natives.
- Capt. Henry T. Elrod of the Marine Fighting Squadron 211 was awarded the Medal of Honor posthumously for his actions during combat at Wake Island from 8 to December 23, 1941. During repeated engagements with superior Japanese air and naval forces, Elrod shot down two enemy aircraft and carried out low-level bombing and strafing attacks that contributed to the sinking of a Japanese destroyer, while flying the F4F. After his aircraft was disabled, he continued fighting on the ground, helping organize the defense of the island and leading his men in repelling repeated enemy assaults. He was ultimately mortally wounded on December 23, 1941 while continuing to lead the defense.
- Capt. Joe Foss of the Marine Fighter Squadron 121 was awarded the Medal of Honor for his actions during aerial combat over Guadalcanal between October 9 and November 19, 1942. During nearly daily engagements with Japanese forces, Foss shot down 23 enemy aircraft while leading multiple escort missions protecting reconnaissance, bombing and surface operations. On January 15, 1943, he added three more aerial victories to his record. Later, on January 15, 1943, he led a mixed force of Marine F4F Wildcats and Army Air Forces P-38s against a larger Japanese aerial formation, helping shoot down four enemy fighters and forcing enemy bombers to turn back without releasing their payload.
- Maj. Robert E. Galer of the Marine Fighter Squadron 224 was awarded the Medal of Honor for his actions during aerial combat against Japanese forces in the Solomon Islands area. Over a period of 29 days, he led repeated aggressive fighter operations against enemy aircraft despite being heavily outnumbered, personally shooting down 11 Japanese bombers and fighters. Under his leadership, his squadron destroyed a total of 27 enemy aircraft while conducting sustained combat missions at high altitude.
- Lt. Edward O'Hare of the Navy Fighting Squadron 3 on USS Lexington (CV-2) was awarded the Medal of Honor for his action during a carrier defense mission off New Ireland in the South Pacific on February 20, 1942, On that mission, O'Hare shot down five Japanese bombers while protecting the carrier and became the Navy's first ace in a day.
- Maj. John L. Smith of Marine Fighting Squadron 223 was awarded the Medal of Honor for his actions during aerial combat operations in the Solomon Islands Area between August 21 and September 15, 1942. Despite leading a squadron with limited combat experience against a determined Japanese force greatly superior in numbers, Smith personally shot down sixteen enemy planes. He commanded his squadron to destroy a total of 83 enemy aircraft during this period.
- 1st Lt. James E. Swett of Marine Fighting Squadron 221 was awarded the Medal of Honor for his actions during an interception mission over the Solomon Islands on April 7, 1943. On that mission, Swett shot down seven Japanese dive bombers and became an ace in a day.

== Variants ==
=== U.S. Navy Wildcats ===
==== F4F-1/-2 ====
The original Grumman F4F-1 design was a biplane, which proved inferior to rival designs, necessitating a complete redesign as a monoplane named the F4F-2. This design was still not competitive with the Brewster F2A Buffalo which won initial U.S. Navy orders, but when the F4F-3 development was fitted with a more powerful version of the engine, a Pratt & Whitney Twin Wasp R-1830-76, featuring a two-stage supercharger, it showed its true potential.

==== F4F-3 ====
U.S. Navy orders followed as did some (with Wright Cyclone engines) from France; these ended up with the Royal Navy's Fleet Air Arm after the fall of France and entered service on 8 September 1940. These aircraft, designated by Grumman as G-36A, had a different cowling from other earlier F4Fs and fixed wings, and were intended to be fitted with French armament and instruments following delivery. In British service initially, the aircraft were known as the Martlet I, but not all Martlets would be to exactly the same specifications as U.S. Navy aircraft. All Martlet Is featured the four .50 in (12.7 mm) M2 Browning machine guns of the F4F-3 with 450 rpg. The British directly ordered and received a version with the original Twin Wasp, but again with a modified cowling, under the manufacturer designation G-36B. These aircraft were given the designation Martlet II by the British. The first 10 G-36Bs were fitted with non-folding wings and were given the designation Martlet III. These were followed by 30 folding wing aircraft (F4F-3As) which were originally destined for the Hellenic Air Force, which were also designated Martlet IIIs. On paper, the designation changed to Martlet III(A) when the second series of Martlet III was introduced.

Poor design of the armament installation on early F4Fs caused these otherwise reliable machine guns to frequently jam, a problem common to wing-mounted weapons of many U.S. fighters early in the war. (Note: Quote: "Early Wildcat guns had a tendency to jam during hard maneuvers") An F4F-3 flown by Lieutenant Edward O'Hare shot down, within a few minutes, five Mitsubishi twin-engine bombers attacking Lexington off Bougainville on 20 February 1942. But contrasting with O'Hare's performance, his wingman was unable to participate because his guns would not function. (Note: Quote" "...O'Hare's wingman discovered his guns were jammed.")

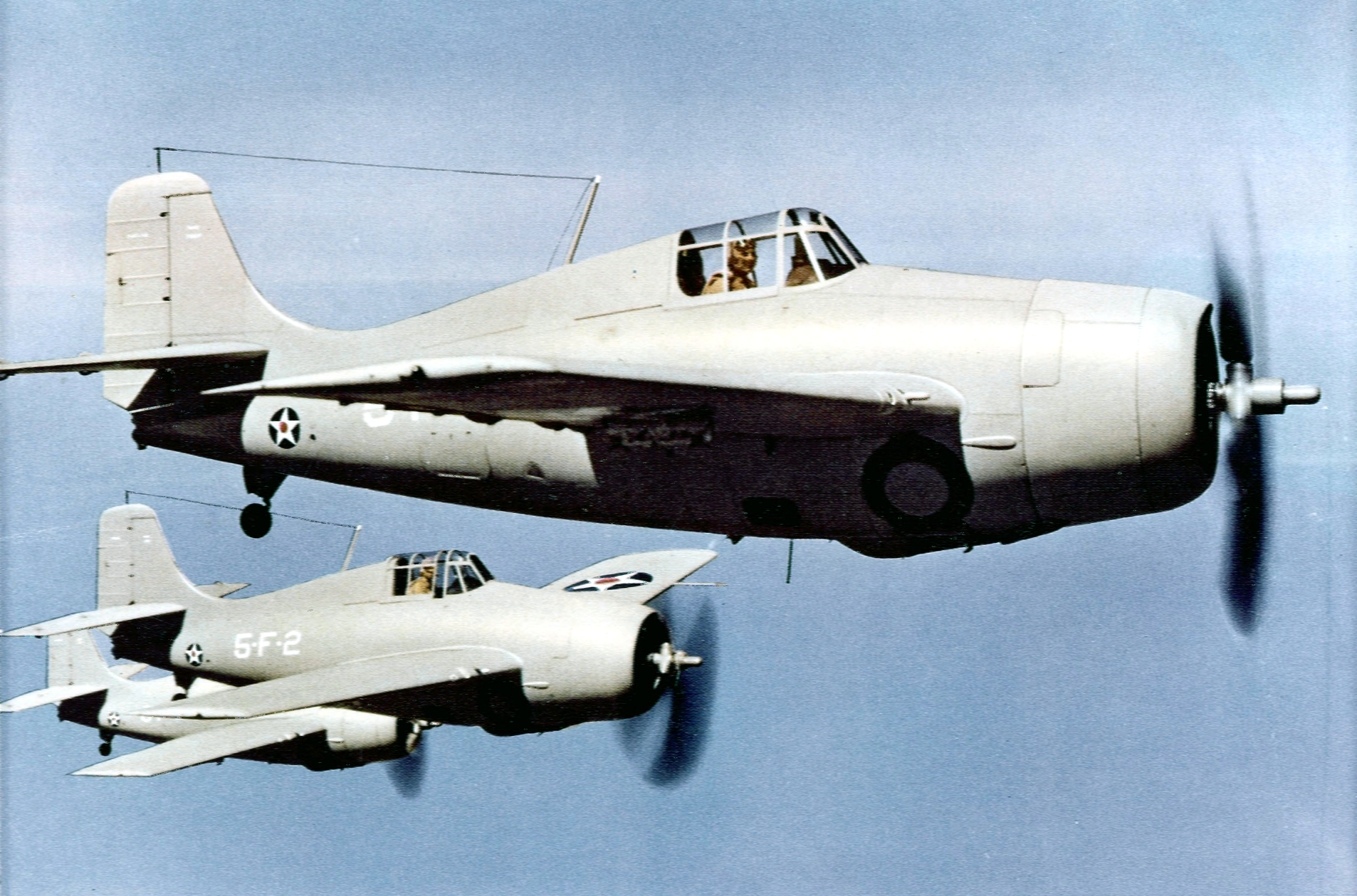
F4F-3s of VF-5, 1941

A shortage of two-stage superchargers led to the development of the F4F-3A, which was basically the F4F-3 but with a 1,200 hp (890 kW) Pratt & Whitney R-1830-90 radial engine with a more primitive single-stage two-speed supercharger. The F4F-3A, which was capable of 312 mph (502 km/h) at 16,000 ft (4,900 m), was used side by side with the F4F-3, but its poorer performance made it unpopular with U.S. Navy fighter pilots. The F4F-3A would enter service as the Martlet III(B).

At the time of Pearl Harbor, only Enterprise had a fully equipped Wildcat squadron, VF-6 with F4F-3As. Enterprise was then transferring a detachment of VMF-211, also equipped with F4F-3s, to Wake. Saratoga was in San Diego, working up for operations of the F4F-3s of VF-3. 11 F4F-3s of VMF-211 were at the Ewa Marine Air Corps Station on Oahu; nine of these were damaged or destroyed during the Japanese attack. The detachment of VMF-211 on Wake lost seven Wildcats to Japanese attacks on 8 December, but the remaining five put up a fierce defense, making the first bomber kill on 9 December. The destroyer Kisaragi was sunk by the Wildcats, and the Japanese invasion force retreated.

In May 1942, the F4F-3s of VF-2 and VF-42, aboard Yorktown and Lexington, participated in the Battle of the Coral Sea. Lexington and Yorktown fought against the fleet carriers Zuikaku and Shōkaku and the light carrier Shōhō in this battle, in an attempt to halt a Japanese invasion of Port Moresby on Papua. During these battles, it became clear that attacks without fighter escort amounted to suicide, but that the fighter component on the carriers was completely insufficient to provide both fighter cover for the carrier and an escort for an attack force. Most U.S. carriers carried fewer than 20 fighters.

==== F4F-3P ====
In June 1942, 17 F4F-3s and one F4F-3A (18 total) were converted into F4F-3P photoreconnaissance planes. The F4F-3Ps were for short-range tactical reconnaissance, as their reserve fuel tanks were removed and replaced with Fairchild F-56 cameras. The F4F-3Ps retained their machine guns and were mainly flown by VMO-251 on air defense missions from Espiritu Santo in the South Pacific, arriving in July 1942. In October 1942, long-ranged and unarmed F4F-7s began replacing the F4F-3Ps, but a detachment of three F4F-3P from VMO-155 operated from the Bogue-class escort carrier USS Nassau (CVE-16) during the amphibious invasion of Attu Island in May 1943. Boston, MA, USA: Little, Brown and Co./Atlantic Monthly Press

==== F4F-3S "Wildcatfish" ====
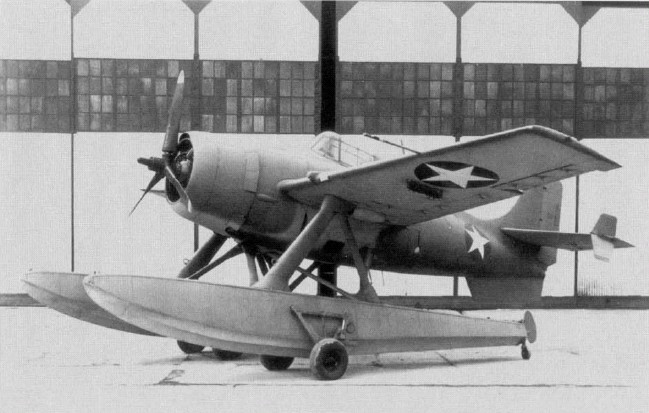
The F4F-3S "Wildcatfish", a floatplane version of the F4F-3. Edo Aircraft fitted one F4F-3 with twin floats.

This floatplane version of the F4F-3 was developed for use at forward island bases in the Pacific, before the construction of airfields. It was inspired by appearance of the A6M2-N "Rufe", a modification of the Mitsubishi A6M2 "Zeke". BuNo 4038 was modified to become the F4F-3S "Wildcatfish". Twin floats, manufactured by Edo Aircraft Corporation, were fitted. To restore the stability, small auxiliary fins were added to the tailplane. Because this was still insufficient, a ventral fin was added later.

The F4F-3S was first flown 28 February 1943. The weight and drag of the floats reduced the maximum speed to 241 mph (388 km/h). As the performance of the basic F4F-3 was already below that of the Zero, the F4F-3S was clearly of limited usefulness. In any case, the construction of the airfields at forward bases by the "Seabees" was surprisingly quick. Only one was converted.

==== F4F-4 ====
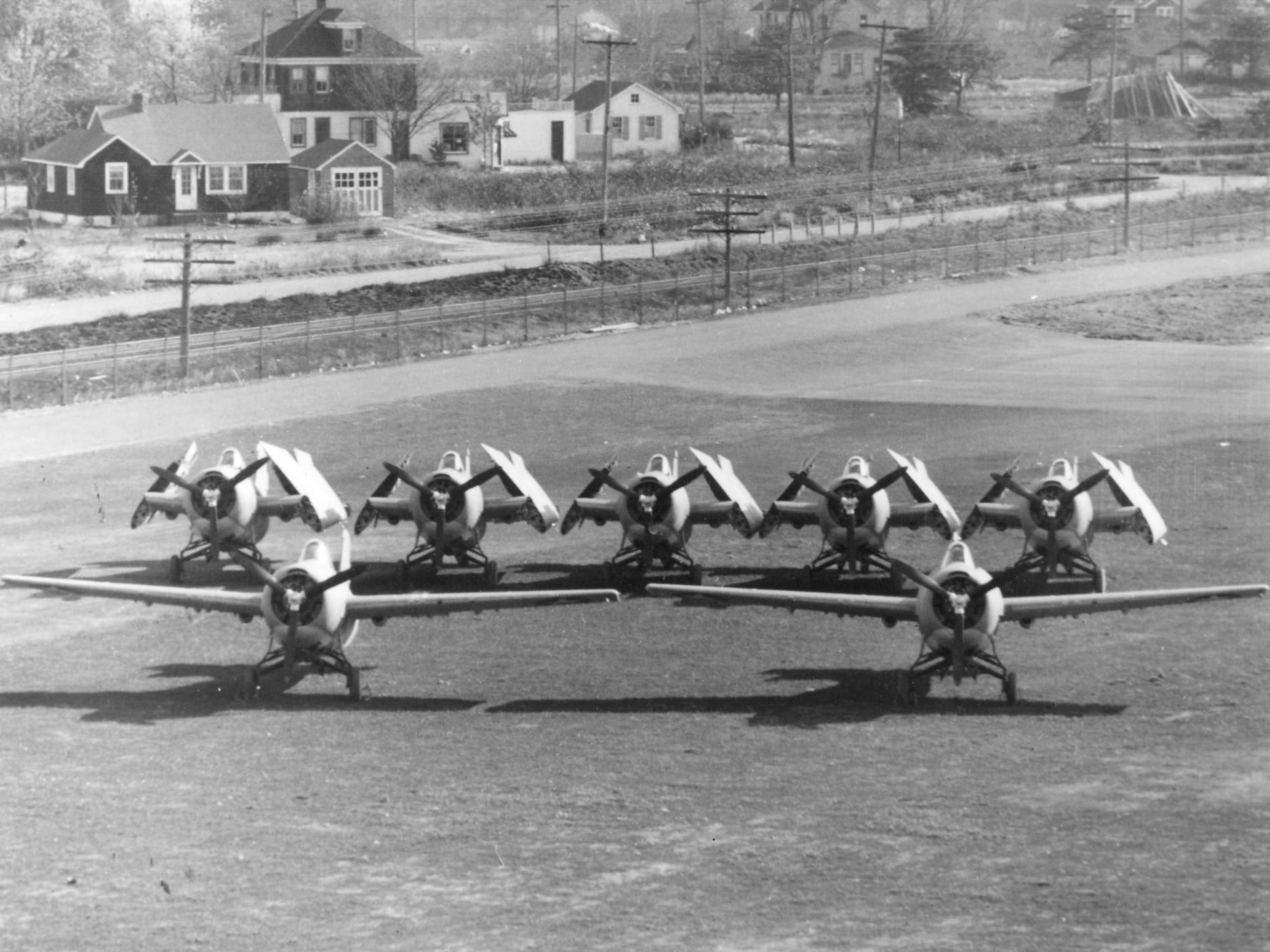
One of the main features of the F4F-4 were the Sto-Wing-design folding wings, a Grumman patented design

A new version, the F4F-4, entered service in 1941 with six machine guns and the Grumman-patented Sto-Wing folding wing system, which allowed more aircraft to be stored on an aircraft carrier, increasing the number of fighters that could be parked on a surface by more than a factor of 2. The F4F-4 was the definitive version that saw the most combat service in the early war years, including the Battle of Midway. Navy F4F-3s were replaced by F4F-4s in June 1942. During the Battle of Midway, only VMF-221 still used F4F-3s. VF-42 of the Yorktown was the last carrier group converted to the F4F-4, and that was done as it left Pearl Harbor on the way to the Battle of Midway as VF-3 flew in new F4F-4s with Commander Thach.

The F4F-4 version was less popular with American pilots because the amount of ammunition was spread over two additional guns, decreasing firing time. With the F4F-3's four .50 in (12.7 mm) guns and 450 rpg, pilots had 34 seconds of firing time; six guns decreased ammunition to 240 rpg, which could be expended in less than 20 seconds. The increase to six guns was attributed to the Royal Navy, who wanted greater firepower to deal with German and Italian foes. Jimmy Thach is quoted as saying, "A pilot who cannot hit with four guns will miss with eight." Extra guns and folding wings meant extra weight and reduced performance: the F4F-4 was capable of only about 318 mph (512 km/h) at 19,400 ft (5,900 m). Rate of climb was noticeably worse in the F4F-4; while Grumman optimistically claimed the F4F-4 could climb at a modest 1,950 ft (590 m) per minute, in combat conditions, pilots found their F4F-4s capable of ascending at only 500 to 1,000 ft (150 to 300 m) per minute. Moreover, the F4F-4's folding wing was intended to allow five F4F-4s to be stowed in the space required by two F4F-3s. In practice, the folding wings allowed an increase of about 50% in the number of Wildcats carried aboard U.S. fleet aircraft carriers. A variant of the F4F-4, designated F4F-4B for contractual purposes, was supplied to the British with a modified cowling and Wright Cyclone engine. These aircraft received the designation of Martlet IV.

==== F4F-5 Wildcat ====
Two F4F-3s (the 3rd and 4th production aircraft, BuNo 1846/1847) were fitted with a Wright R-1820-40 engine and designated XF4F-5.

==== FM-1/-2 Wildcat ====
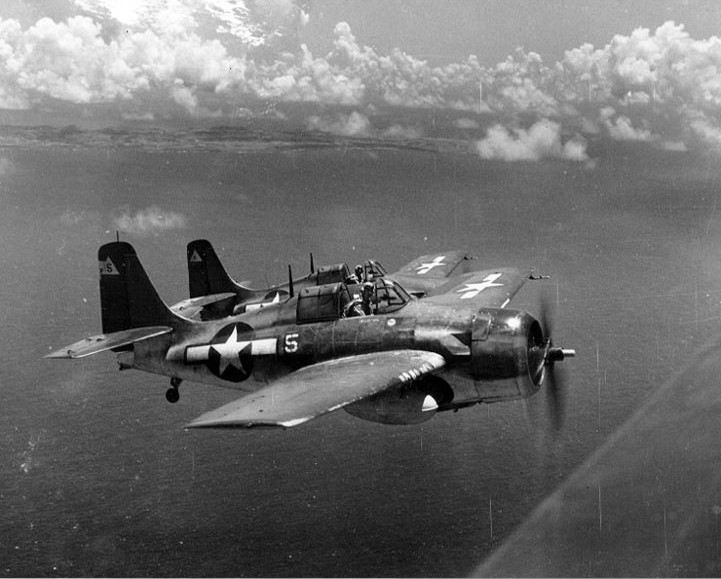
FM-2s from White Plains, in June 1944, with 58 gallon drop tanks

General Motors' Eastern Aircraft Division produced 5,280 FM variants of the Wildcat. Grumman's Wildcat production ceased in early 1943 to make way for the newer F6F Hellcat, but General Motors continued producing Wildcats for both U.S. Navy and Fleet Air Arm use. Late in the war, the Wildcat was obsolescent as a front line fighter compared to the faster (380 mph/610 km/h) F6F Hellcat or much faster (446 mph/718 km/h) F4U Corsair. However, they were adequate for small escort carriers against submarine and shore threats. These relatively modest ships only carried two types of aircraft, the Wildcats and GM-built TBM Avengers. The Wildcat's lower landing speed and ability to take off without a catapult made it more suitable for shorter flight decks. At first, GM produced the FM-1, identical to the F4F-4, but reduced the number of guns to four, and added wing racks for two 250 lb (110 kg) bombs or six rockets. Production later switched to the improved FM-2 (based on Grumman's XF4F-8 prototype) optimized for small-carrier operations, with a more powerful engine (the 1,350 hp (1,010 kW) Wright R-1820-56), and a taller tail to cope with the torque.

==== F4F-7 ====
The F4F-7 was a photoreconnaissance variant, with armor and armament removed. It had non-folding "wet" wings that carried an additional 555 gal (2,101 L) of fuel for a total of about 700 gal (2,650 L), increasing its range to 3,700 mi (5,955 km). A total of 21 were built.

==== F2M Wildcat ====
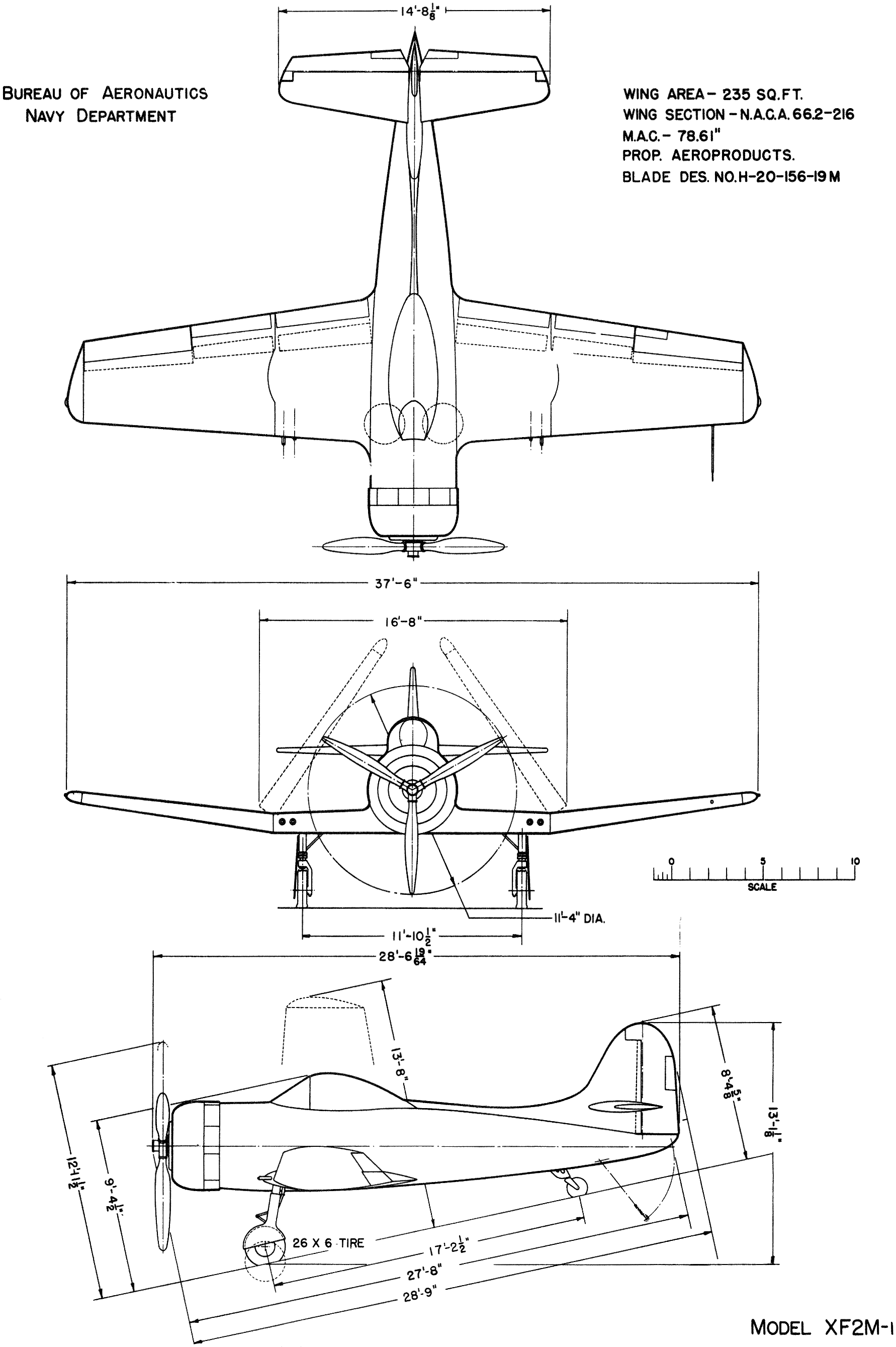
A three view drawing of the proposed XF2M-1.

The F2M-1 was a planned development of the FM-1 by General Motors / Eastern Aircraft to be powered by the improved XR-1820-70 engine, but the project was canceled before any aircraft were built.

=== Royal Navy Martlets ===
==== Martlet Mk I ====
At the end of 1939, Grumman received a French order for 81 aircraft of model G-36A, to equip their new Joffre-class aircraft carriers Joffre and Painlevé. The main difference from the basic model G-36 was due to the unavailability for export of the two-stage supercharged engine of the F4F-3. The G-36A was powered by the nine-cylinder, single-row Wright R-1820-G205A radial engine, of 1,200 hp (890 kW) and with a single-stage two-speed supercharger.

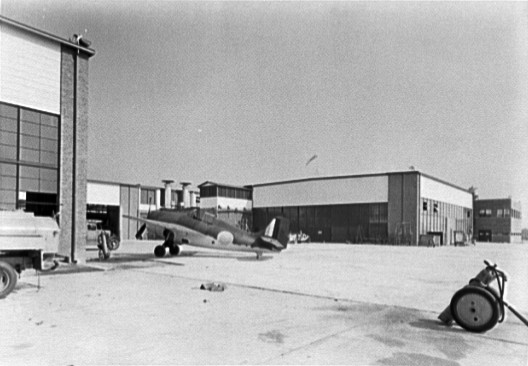
A G-36A at Grumman, 1940

The G-36A also had French instruments (with metric calibration), radio and gunsight. The throttle was modified to conform to French pre-war practice: the throttle lever was moved towards the pilot (i.e. backward) to increase engine power. The armament which was to be fitted in France was four 7.5 mm (.296 in) Darne machine guns (two in the fuselage and two in the wings). The first G-36A was flown on 11 May 1940. After France's defeat in the Battle of France, all contracts were taken over by Britain. The throttle was modified again, four 0.50 in (12.7 mm) guns were installed in the wings and most traces of the original ownership removed.

The Martlets were modified for British use by Blackburn, which continued to do this for all later marks. British gunsights, catapult spools and other items were installed. After attempts to fit British radio sets, it was decided to use the superior American equipment. The first Martlets entered British service in August 1940, with 804 Naval Air Squadron, stationed at Hatston in the Orkney Islands. The Martlet Mk I did not have a wing folding mechanism and was therefore used primarily from land bases, with the notable exception of six aircraft of 882 Sqn aboard Illustrious from March 1942. In April 1942 Illustrious transferred two Martlet I aircraft to HMS Archer while in port at Freetown. One of her four retained Martlet I aircraft were subsequently fitted with folding wings by ship's staff during passage to Durban. In 1940, Belgium also placed an order for at least 10 G-36A's. These were to be modified with the same changes to the French aircraft, plus the removal of the tailhook as they were to be landbased. Belgium surrendered before any aircraft were delivered and by 10 May 1940, the aircraft order was transferred to the Royal Navy.

==== Martlet Mk II ====
Before the Fleet Air Arm took on charge the Martlet Mk Is, it had already ordered 100 G-36B fighters. The British chose the Pratt & Whitney R-1830-S3C4-G engine to power this aircraft; this too had a single-stage, two-speed supercharger. The FAA decided to accept a delay in delivery to get Martlets fitted out with the Grumman-designed and patented Sto-Wing folding wing system first fitted onto U.S. Navy F4F-4 Wildcats, which were vitally important if the Martlet was to be used from the first 3 Illustrious class carriers which had elevators that were too narrow to accommodate non-folding wing aircraft. Nevertheless, the first 10 received had fixed wings. The first Martlet with folding wings was not delivered until August 1941.

In contrast to the USN F4F-3, the British aircraft were fitted with armor and self-sealing fuel tanks. The Mk II also had a larger tailwheel. For carrier operations, the "sting" tail hook and attachment point for the American single-point catapult launch system were considered important advantages. Nevertheless, the Martlets were modified to have British-style catapult spools. Deliveries of the folding-wing G-36Bs began in August 1941, with 36 shipped to the UK and 54 shipped to the Far East; they were designated "Martlet Mark II". Aeroplane and Armament Experimental Establishment (A&AEE) testing of the Martlet II at a mean weight of approximately 7,350 lb (3,330 kg) showed a maximum speed of 293 mph (472 km/h) at 5,400 ft (1,600 m) and 13,800 ft (4,200 m), a maximum climb rate of 1,940 ft/min (9.9 m/s) at 7,600 ft (2,300 m) at 7,790 lb (3,530 kg) weight, and a time to climb to 20,000 ft (6,100 m) of 12.5 minutes. The service ceiling at 7,790 lb (3,530 kg) was 31,000 ft (9,400 m).

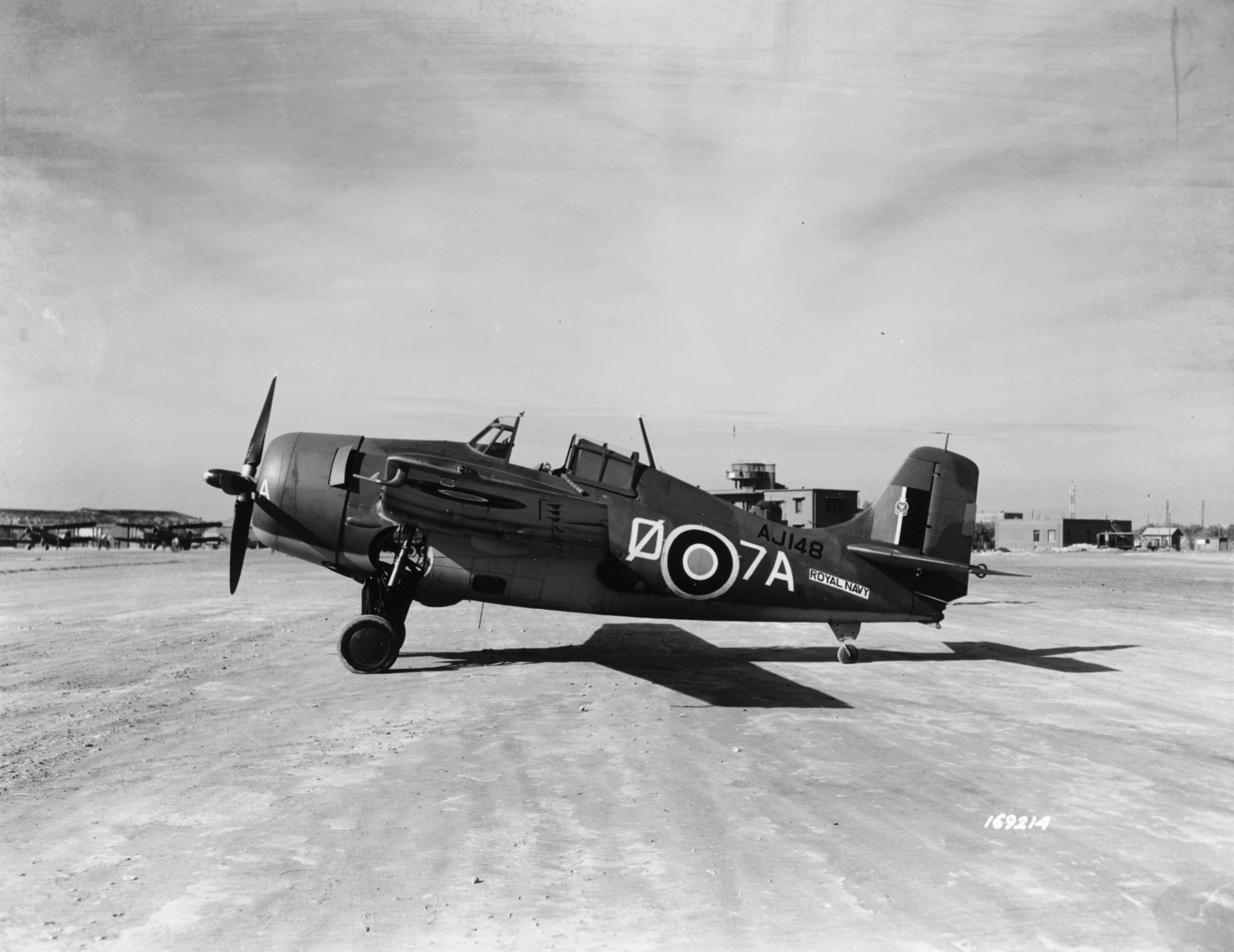
A Martlet II from HMS Formidable, 1942

The Martlet was the second single-seat, monoplane fighter to operate from Royal Navy aircraft carriers following the introduction of the Sea Hurricane IB on HMS Furious in July 1941.

The majority of the Martlet Mk IIs were sent to the Far East. The first shipboard operations of the type in British service were in September 1941, aboard HMS Audacity, a very small escort carrier with a carrier deck of 420 ft (130 m) by 59 ft (18 m), no elevators and no hangar deck. The six Wildcats were parked on the deck at all times. On its first voyage, it served as escort carrier for a convoy to Gibraltar. On 20 September, a German Fw 200 was shot down. On the next voyage, four Fw 200 Condors fell to the guns of the Martlets, and of the combined total, two of these five Condors were shot down by Eric "Winkle" Brown during his time aboard. Operations from Audacity also demonstrated that the fighter cover was useful against U-boats. Audacity was sunk by a U-boat on 21 December 1941, and of the pilots only Brown and one other survived, but it had already proved the usefulness of escort carriers.

In May 1942, 881 and 882 squadrons on HMS Illustrious participated in operations against Madagascar. In August 1942, 806 NAS on HMS Indomitable provided fighter cover for a convoy to Malta. Later in that year they participated in the landings in French North Africa.

==== Martlet Mk III ====
The first 30 F4F-3As were released for sale to Greece, after the Italian invasion in November 1940. However, at the defeat of Greece in April 1941 the aircraft had only reached Gibraltar. They were taken over by the FAA as Martlet Mk III(B). As these aircraft did not have folding wings, they were only used from land bases. They served in a shore-based role in the Western Desert.

Ten fixed-wing G-36Bs were used by the FAA as Martlet III(A).

==== Martlet Mk IV ====
The Royal Navy purchased 220 F4F-4s adapted to British requirements. The main difference was the use of a Wright R-1820-40B Cyclone in a distinctly more rounded and compact cowling, with a single double-wide flap on each side of the rear and no lip intake. These machines were named Martlet Mk IV. Boscombe Down testing of the Martlet IV at 7,350 lb (3,330 kg) weight showed a maximum speed of 278 mph (447 km/h) at 3,400 ft (1,000 m) and 298 mph (480 km/h) at 14,600 ft (4,500 m), a maximum climb rate of 1,580 ft/min (8.0 m/s) at 6,200 ft (1,900 m) at 7,740 lb (3,510 kg) weight, and a time to climb to 20,000 ft (6,100 m) of 14.6 minutes. The service ceiling at 7,740 lb (3,510 kg) was 30,100 ft (9,200 m).

==== Martlet Mk V ====
The Fleet Air Arm purchased 312 FM-1s, originally with the designation of Martlet V. In January 1944, a decision was made to retain the American names for US-supplied aircraft, redesignating the batch as the Wildcat V.

==== Wildcat Mk VI ====
The Wildcat VI was the Air Ministry name for the FM-2 Wildcat in FAA service.

== Operators ==
Belgium

- Belgian Air Force: at least 10 G-36A's ordered, never delivered, transferred to France (who then transferred them to the Royal Navy) after surrender.

France

- Aeronavale: 81 aircraft ordered, never delivered, transferred to Royal Navy after French defeat.

Greece

- Hellenic Air Force: 30 Martlet Mk III's ordered, delivered to Gibraltar, transferred to Royal Navy after defeat.

Canada

- Royal Canadian Navy: RCN personnel assigned to the Royal Navy HMS Puncher, were to provide the RCN with experience in aircraft carrier operations. The RCN flew 14 Martlets as part of 881 (RN) Squadron from February–July 1945.

United Kingdom

- Royal Navy Fleet Air Arm

United States

- United States Navy
- United States Marine Corps

== Specifications (F4F-3) ==

Data from The American Fighter

General characteristics

- Crew: 1
- Length: 28 ft 9 in (8.76 m)
- Wingspan: 38 ft 0 in (11.58 m)
- Height: 11 ft 10 in (3.61 m)
- Wing area: 260 sq ft (24 m^{2})
- Airfoil: root: NACA 23015; tip: NACA 23009
- Empty weight: 4,907 lb (2,226 kg)
- Gross weight: 7,423 lb (3,367 kg)
- Powerplant: 1 × Pratt & Whitney R-1830-76 14-cylinder air-cooled radial piston engine, 1,200 hp (890 kW)
- Propellers: 3-bladed constant-speed propeller

Performance

- Maximum speed: 331 mph (533 km/h, 288 kn)
- Range: 845 mi (1,360 km, 734 nmi)
- Service ceiling: 39,500 ft (12,000 m)
- Rate of climb: 2,303 ft/min (11.70 m/s)
- Wing loading: 28.5 lb/sq ft (139 kg/m^{2})
- Power/mass: 0.282 kW/kg (0.172 hp/lb)

Armament

- Guns: 4 × 0.50 in (12.7 mm) AN/M2 Browning machine guns with 450 rounds per gun
- Bombs: 2 × 100 lb (45.4 kg) bombs and/or 2 × 58 US gal (48 imp gal; 220 L) drop tanks

== See also ==
- Joe Foss, the top scoring Wildcat ace with 26 victories, flying with VMF-121 during World War II and a recipient of the Medal of Honor.
- John Lucian Smith, second scoring Wildcat ace with 19 victories while flying with VMF-223 and also a recipient of the Medal of Honor.
- Marion Eugene Carl, the third scoring Wildcat ace with 16.5 victories while flying Wildcats, plus an additional two flying Vought F4U Corsairs while in service with VMF-221 and VMF-223.

Related development

- Grumman F3F
- Grumman F6F Hellcat

Aircraft of comparable role, configuration, and era

- Brewster F2A Buffalo
- Hawker Sea Hurricane
- Mitsubishi A6M Zero
- Nakajima Ki-43
- Supermarine Seafire

Related lists

- List of aircraft of the Fleet Air Arm
- List of fighter aircraft
- List of United States Navy aircraft designations (pre-1962)
- List of aircraft of the United States during World War II
- List of aircraft of World War II
