= Camp Shorabak =

Military air base in Afghanistan

- کمپ شورابک
- Near Gereshk, Helmand Province in Afghanistan
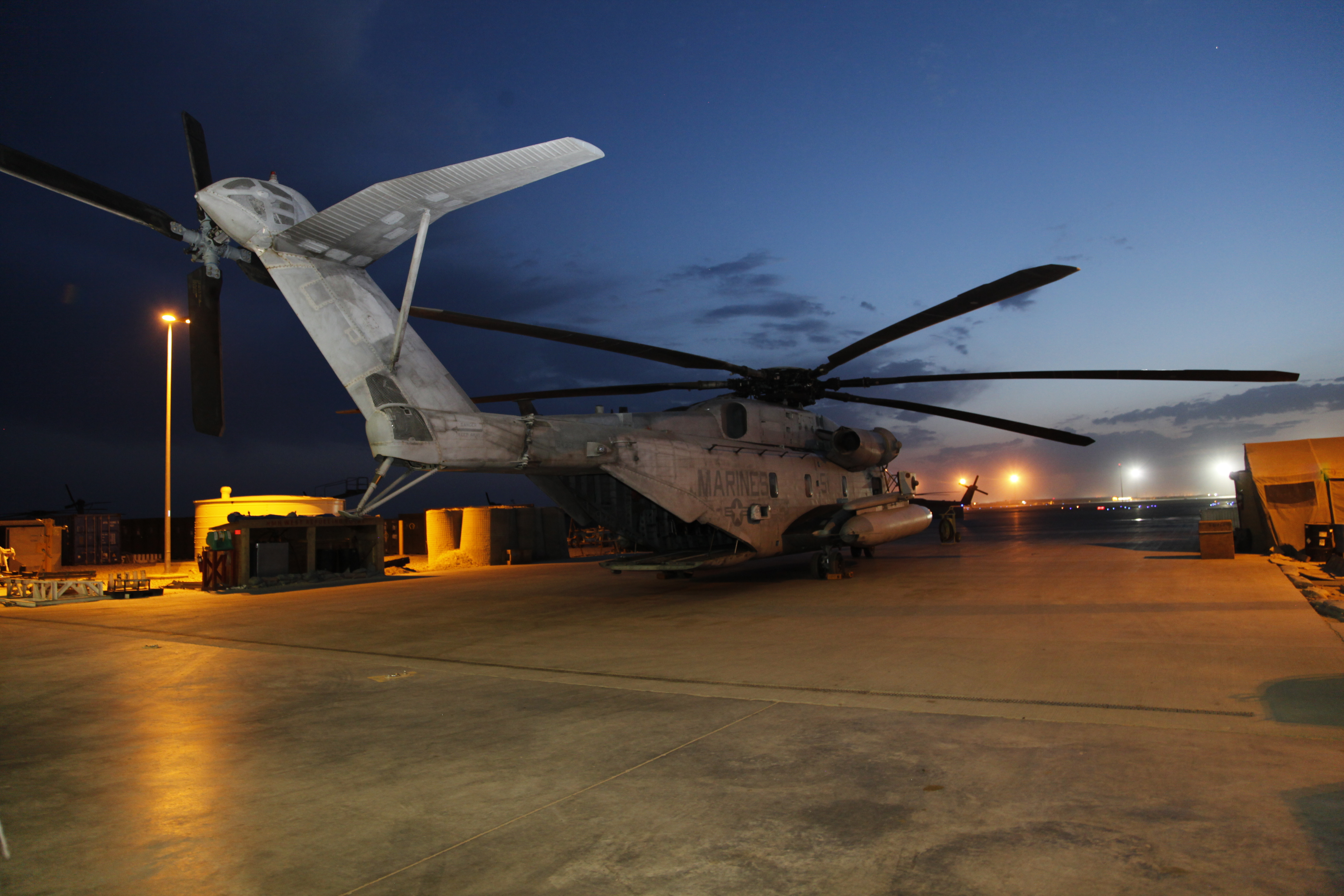
- U.S. Marine Corps Sikorsky CH-53E Super Stallion helicopter at the camp in 2013

Site information
- Owner: Ministry of Defense
- Operator: Afghan Armed Forces

Location
- Shown within Afghanistan
- Coordinates: 31°51′06″N 064°11′52″E

Site history
- Built: 2005
- In use: 2005–present

Garrison information
- Past commanders: RAF Group Captain Tony Innes, Commander Bastion and Commanding Officer 903 Expeditionary Air Wing.

Airfield information
- Identifiers: IATA: OAZ, ICAO: OAZI
- Elevation: 2,915 feet (888 m) AMSL
Runways
Direction	Length and surface
01/19	3,500 metres (11,483 ft) Concrete/Asphalt
Helipads
Number	Length and surface
HLS 01/19	500 metres (1,640 ft) Concrete
- Garrison of 11,000–12,000 troops. Could hold over 28,000/ 32,000 troops. Airfield Sources: AIP Afghanistan, DoD FLIP

Camp Shorabak (formerly Camp Bastion) is a former British Military airbase, located northwest of the city of Lashkargah in Helmand Province, Afghanistan. The camp was situated in a remote desert area, far from population centres.

The camp was built by the British Army in 2005–06, and on 27 October 2014 the British Military handed over control to the Afghan Ministry of Defense. Between 2005 and October 2014 it was the logistics hub for International Security Assistance Force (ISAF) operations in Helmand during the War in Afghanistan and Operation Herrick, and it was capable of accommodating over 32,000 people. It was the largest British overseas military camp built since the Second World War. The base was also home to troops from other states, including the United States and Denmark.

Shorabak contained the Afghan National Army (ANA) camp (also called Camp Shorabak), and also held Camp Leatherneck until 2014.

The Taliban took control of Afghanistan in July–August 2021; the camp is now under control by the Taliban.

== History ==
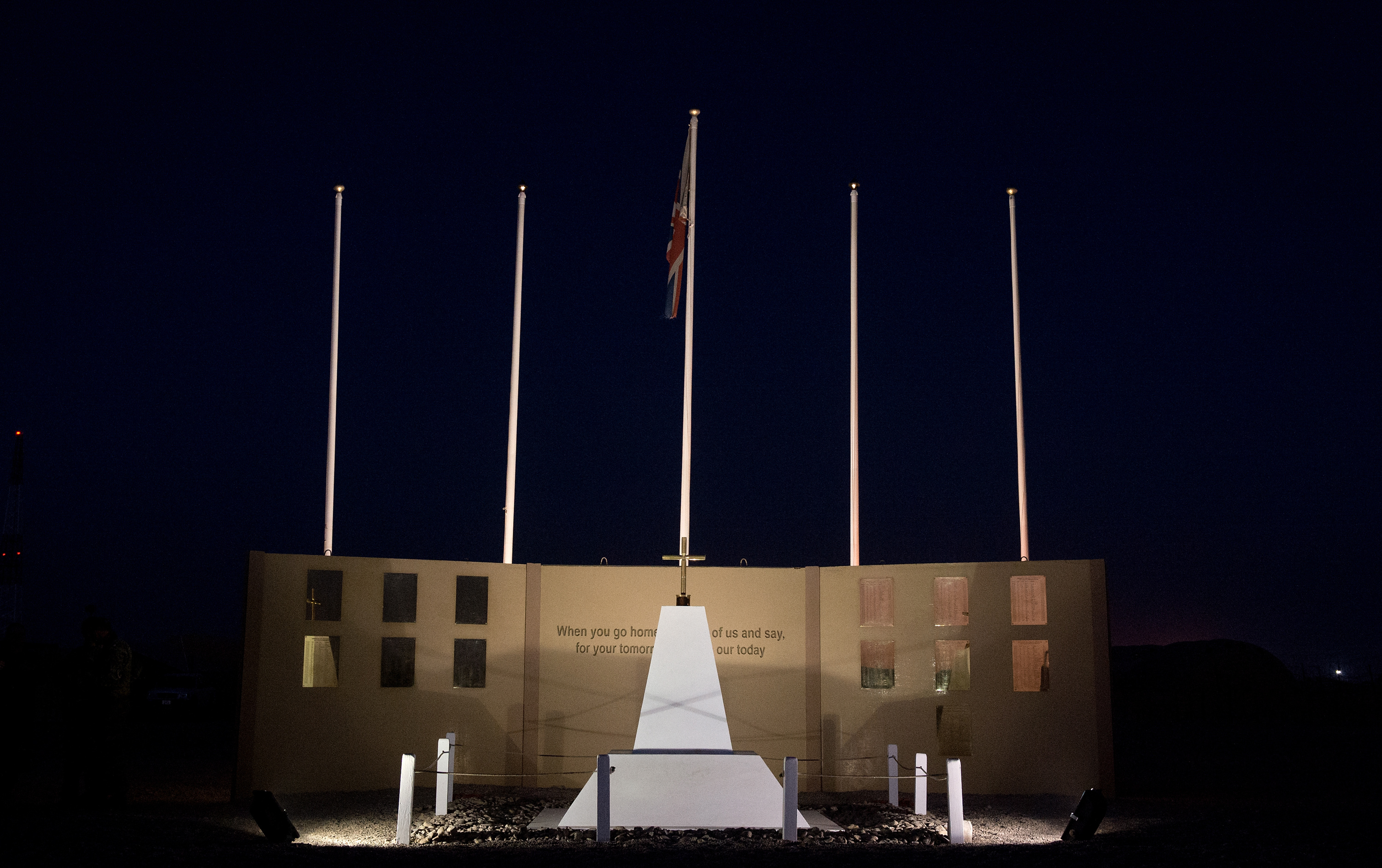
Memorial Wall at Camp Bastion, 2014

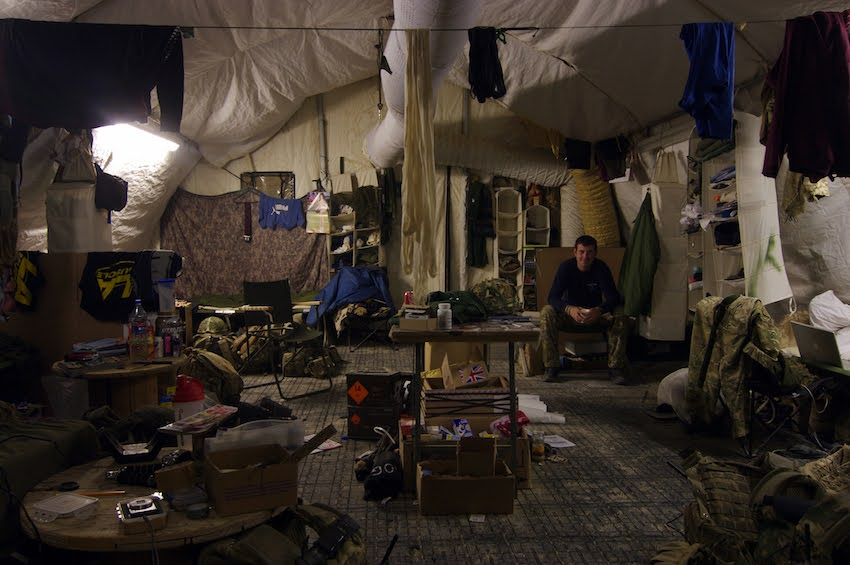
2 PARA bedspaces during 2011

Camp Shorabak was known as Camp Bastion until 2014. It was a tactical landing zone set up by two air traffic controllers from the Royal Air Force's Tactical Air Traffic Control Unit. This provided a vital and strategic insertion point in Helmand Province during the western intervention in the War in Afghanistan.

The camp started out with just a few tents in 2005. However, from early 2006 personnel from 39 Engineer Regiment Royal Engineers and various contracting firms, all under the supervision of 62 Works Group Royal Engineers started to build the base with more robust facilities. In November 2006, the then British Prime Minister Tony Blair visited Camp Bastion, and, while addressing a gathering of British troops, described it as an "extraordinary piece of desert ... where the fate of world security in the early 21st century is going to be decided".

Four miles long by two miles wide, the camp had a busy airfield and a field hospital and originally had full accommodation for 2,000 people.

The base was originally named by the Commanding Officer of 62 Works Group (RE) based upon name of the gabions used to form the compounds walls; Hesco Bastion. The first camp to be built was Camp 251 which housed the construction force and they were housed in tents. The first runway capable of handling C-17s direct from the United Kingdom opened in Camp Bastion on 3 December 2007.

The base had previously been divided into a number of different sections (bastions). Bastions 1 and 2 were the first, with Bastion 2 containing Camp Barber (US) and Camp Viking (DK). Bastion 0 was added in around 2010 and housed the contractors and Bastion 3 was used for in-theatre training.

Camp Bastion included Bastion Airfield, Bastion Garrison and Camp Leatherneck along with Rowe Lines.

On 14 September 2012, the base was infiltrated and attacked by the Taliban. The attack resulted in two marines killed, while 17 US and UK personnel were injured. 6 AV-8B Harriers and one C-130 Hercules aircraft were destroyed, with an additional two Harriers damaged.

By September 2014 it was reported that both Bastion 2 and 3 had reverted to desert.

Camp Bastion airfield and heliport handled up to 600 fixed- and rotary-wing aircraft movements every day in 2011, operating combat, medical and logistics flights. Its air traffic controllers were integral to the support of the UK's operations in southern Afghanistan and the Air Traffic Control Squadron at Camp Bastion was the first to recruit and train US Marines to UK air traffic control standards.

In February 2014, snow fell in Camp Bastion for the first time since the base was established, eight years earlier.

The camp was handed over to the control of the Afghan security forces on 26 October 2014.

On 27 November 2014, insurgents infiltrated Camp Bastion. As of Sunday 30 November, the Afghan National Army had not fully driven out the "Taliban" fighters. At least five ANA soldiers were killed in the attack.

Upon completion of British and US military withdrawal from Camp Bastion, it was renamed Camp Shorabak as this was the name of the Afghan base situated there.

In December 2015, it was announced that a small contingency of British troops would return to Camp Shorabak in an advisory role, due to the Taliban overrun of Sangin district in Helmand province.

The base was initially home to the Afghan National Army and during Operation Herrick 7 2nd Battalion, the Yorkshire Regiment's Battlegroup HQ.

Before the 2021 Taliban takeover, home to 4th Kandak, 3rd Brigade, 205th Corps.

The ring road, watchtowers and large parts of Bastion still remain maintained.

=== United Kingdom ===
==== Aviation ====
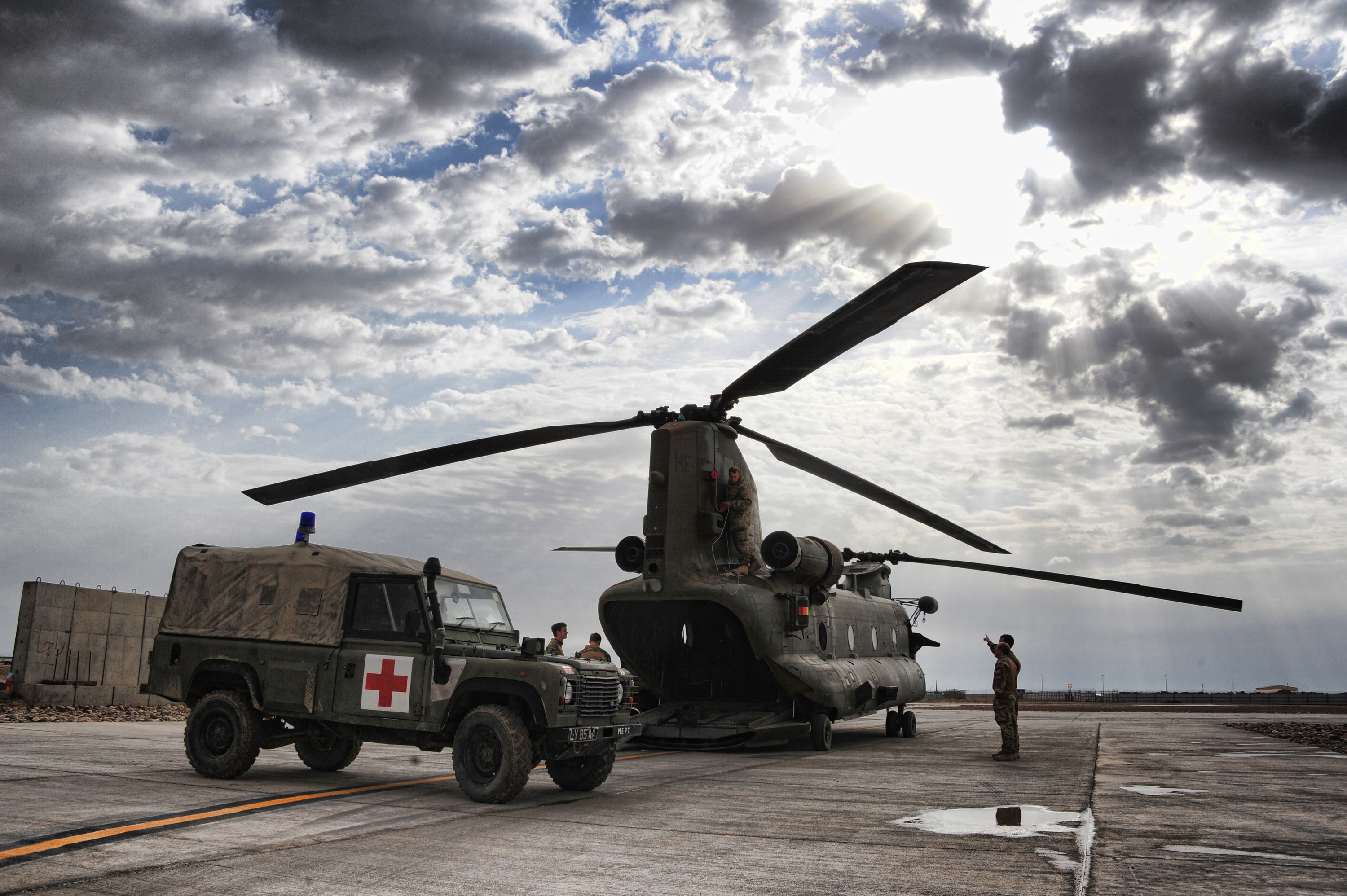
An ambulance waits to receive a casualty from a Chinook on the helipad.

The main user of the camp was the United Kingdom which based a number of rotary and a few fixed-wing aircraft.

During June 2011 a brand new air traffic control tower was opened which was built by 170 Engineer Group, with Fixed Communications Infrastructure installed by 241 Sig Sqn, 10 Sig Regt.

The main aviation unit was No. 903 Expeditionary Air Wing which was responsible for the operation of the airfield and operated the Raytheon Sentinel R1 - Airborne Stand-Off Radar (ASTOR) along with Westland Sea King ASACs and Thales Watchkeepers.

Joint Helicopter Force (Afghanistan) operated AgustaWestland Apaches, Westland Lynx, Westland Sea Kings, Boeing Chinooks of No. 1310 Flight RAF and AgustaWestland Merlins of No. 1419 Flight RAF. Both RAF Flights performed troop and cargo moves but the Chinook also carried the Medical Emergency Response Team (MERT) and Incident Response Teams (IRT).

==== Ground based ====
The UK had a large number of major units based here:

- Afghanistan Media Operations Cell
- Crew Training School (for vehicles)
- EOD & Search Task Force
- Joint Force Support (Afghanistan) which included:
  - Joint Force Medical Group.
  - Joint Media Operations Centre.
  - Joint Theatre Education Centre.
  - Theatre Military Working Dogs Support Unit.
  - Theatre Logistic Group.

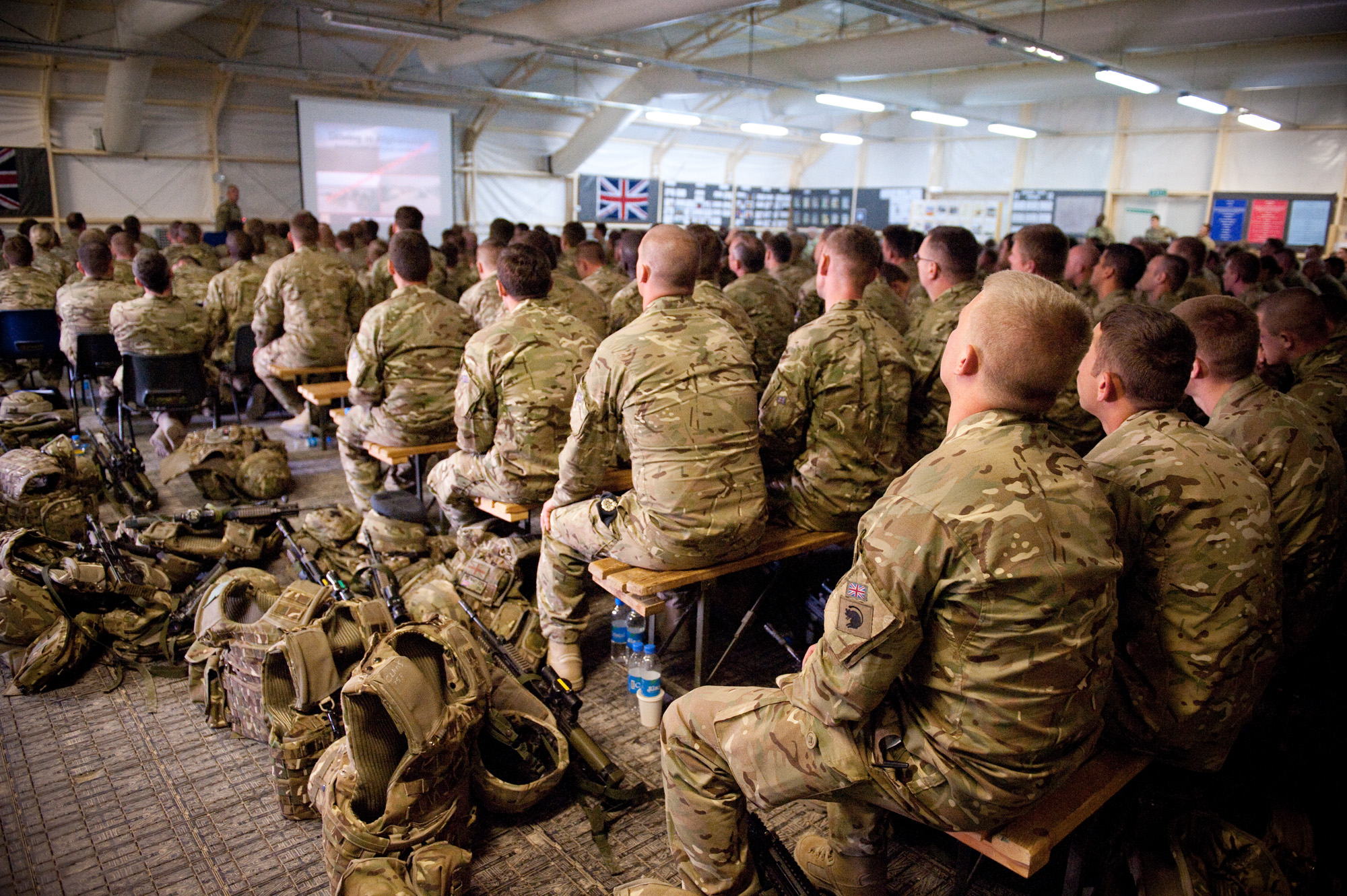
Newly arrived soldiers listen to a briefing in 2012

A number of smaller units were also deployed here including:

- Base Security
  - No 2 Tactical Police Sqn, Royal Air Force Police
  - OP H 19 - A Company - The Highlanders, 4th Battalion, Royal Regiment of Scotland
- Joint ISTAR Group (brigade surveillance and reconnaissance support)
  - OP H 19 - 9th/12th Royal Lancers
- Units based at Bastion
  - OP H 7 - 40 Commando Battlegroup HQ
  - OP H 10/11 - 2nd Royal Tank Regiment (Egypt Squadron)
  - OP H 13 - 16 Air Assault Medical Regiment - Elements of 19, 23 & 181 Medical Support Squadrons.
  - OP H 19 - 4 SCOTS
  - OP H 20 - 26th Regiment RA

The base was protected by the Bastion Force Protection Wing as part of the multi-national Task Force Belleau Wood.

During August 2013 the Headquarters of Task Force Helmand moved from Lashkar Gah to Bastion.

In 2013, a training school for Afghan troops was opened.

By March 2014, the population of the camp had reduced to 4,000 UK service personnel, as preparations were well-underway for UK military withdrawal from Helmand in October 2014.

During the dismantling of the base the scrap metal was taken away by ProCon Building Materials Trading LLC.

=== United States ===
The United States Military used part of Bastion Airfield for their aircraft and they had their own camp within Camp Bastion until 26 October 2014.

The last unit was the 2nd Marine Aircraft Wing (Forward) which began operating from April 2014. It consisted of:

- Marine Light Attack Helicopter Squadron 467 (HMLA-467) which operated Bell AH-1W SuperCobras and Bell UH-1Y Venoms.
- Marine Wing Support Squadron 274 (MWSS-274) from 7 April 2014.

Marine Wing Support Squadron-371(February 2009-October) laid aluminum matting in Camp Bastion and throughout Helmand Province.

On 14 September 2012 Camp Bastion was attacked by a unit of 15 Taliban fighters. The base was defended by pilots and aircraft maintenance personnel from Marine Attack Squadron 211 and No. 51 Squadron RAF Regiment. Base security had been reduced in the weeks leading up to the attack, and the Taliban unit was able to damage or destroy eight USMC AV-8B Harrier II jets before all were killed or captured. Two Marines died in the fighting.

=== Other countries ===
While the base was run by the United Kingdom, Camp Bastion was used by a number of other countries including Denmark (until 20 May 2014), Estonia (until 9 May 2014) and Tonga (until 28 April 2014).

=== Hospital ===
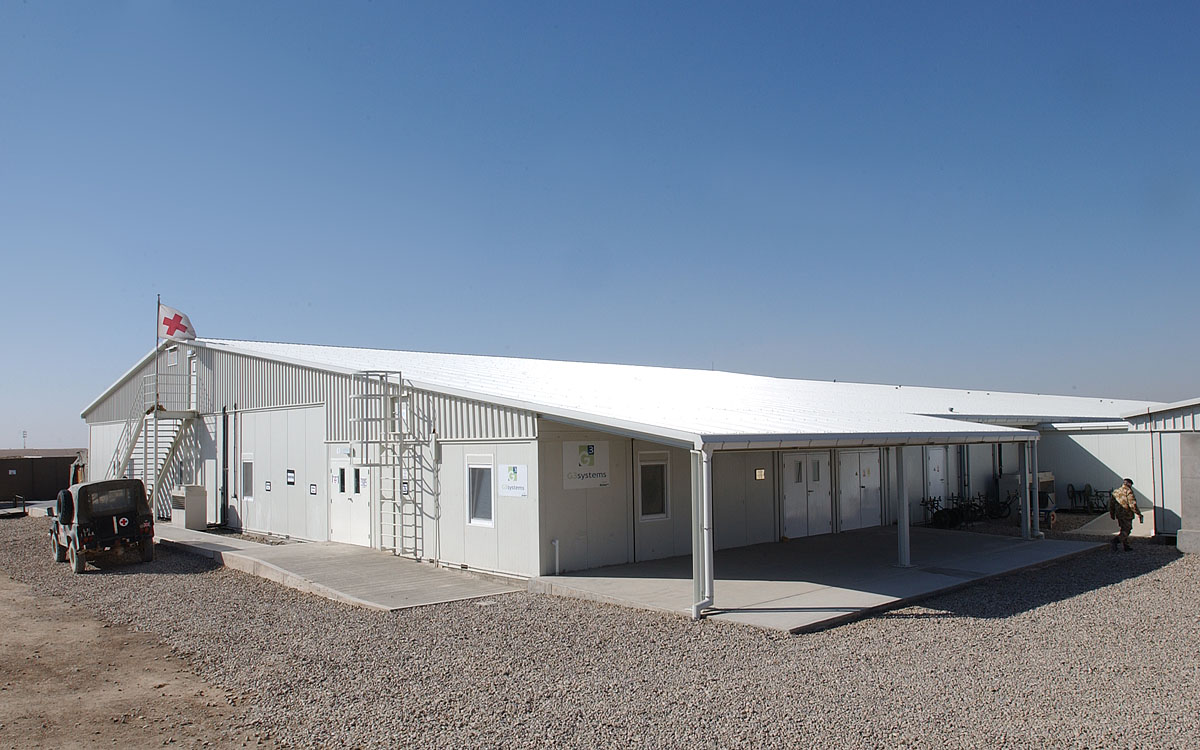
Medical Treatment Facility in 2008, one of the few solid buildings in the camp

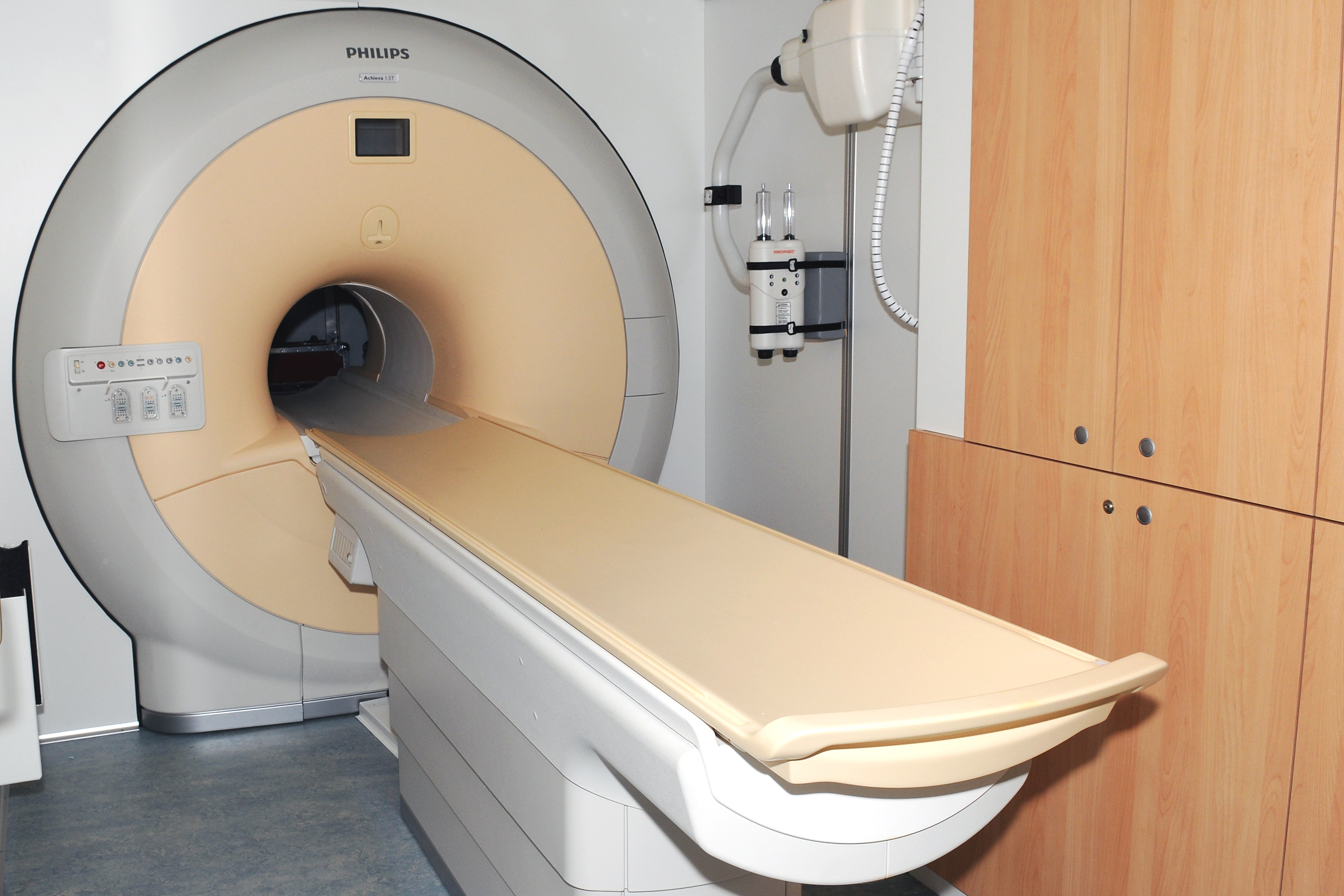
An MRI machine is set up at the Role 3 Medical Facility

Camp Bastion's Hospital was built by 170 Engineer Group and was operated by regular and reserve personnel of the British Army, Royal Navy, and Royal Air Force of the Joint Force Medical Group, as well as medical assets from the US Army. Medical staff included orthopaedic surgeons, general surgeons, anaesthetists, nurses and medics. The hospital was the location to which wounded military personnel from the British, US and other ISAF forces in Helmand Province were evacuated from the battlefield for treatment, supported by US Army, Navy, and Air Force medics, or from which they were further evacuated to the Royal Centre for Defence Medicine at Queen Elizabeth Hospital in Birmingham. Afghan civilians were also treated at the hospital for injuries sustained in war including victims of improvised explosive device attacks. The hospital was closed down on 22 September 2014.

A number of units were deployed to Afghanistan and worked at the hospital:

- OP H 4 - 22 Field Hospital (Hospital Squadron)
- OP H 5 - Royal Navy Hospital Squadron
- OP H 6A - 212 (Yorkshire) Field Hospital
- OP H 6B - 208 (Liverpool) Field Hospital
- OP H 7A - 201 (Northern) Field Hospital
- OP H 7B - 243 (The Wessex) Field Hospital
- OP H 8A - 203 (Welsh) Field Hospital
- OP H 8B - 204 (North Irish) Field Hospital
- OP H 9 - Royal Navy Hospital Squadron
- OP H 10A - 202 (Midlands) Field Hospital
- OP H 10B - Danish Field Hospital
- OP H 11 - 33 Field Hospital
- OP H 11A - 256 Field Hospital
- OP H 11B - 205 Field Hospital
- OP H 12 - 34 Field Hospital
- OP H 13A - 207 (Manchester) Field Hospital
- OP H 13B - 212 (Yorkshire) Field Hospital
- OP H 14 - Royal Navy Hospital Squadron
- OP H 15A - 208 (Liverpool) Field Hospital
- OP H 15B - 201 (Northern) Field Hospital
- OP H 16 - 22 Field Hospital
- OP H 17A - 243 (The Wessex) Field Hospital
- OP H 17B - 204 (North Irish) Field Hospital
- OP H 18 - 33 Field Hospital
- OP H 19A - 203 (Welsh) Field Hospital
- OP H 19B - 202 (Midlands) Field Hospital
- OP H 20 - 34 Field Hospital

== Accidents and incidents ==
The base has been attacked several times including on 14 September 2012, when two United States Marine Corps (USMC) service personnel were killed and six USMC McDonnell Douglas AV-8B Harrier IIs were destroyed and two were "significantly damaged." Three refuelling stations were also destroyed, with six soft-skin aircraft hangars damaged. Of the 15 Taliban attackers, 14 were killed and 1 captured.

In May 2013 the BBC obtained documents showing that up to 85 Afghan nationals were being detained at Camp Shorabak. Philip Hammond, the then defence secretary, confirmed that the UK was holding "80 or 90 Afghan detainees" at the base. The Ministry of Defence maintained the detention of the Afghans is legal.

On 1 March 2019, Taliban suicide bombers and gunmen made an early morning attack on Afghan forces at Camp Shorabak, killing 23, following another round of talks between U.S. and Taliban negotiators. According to an American military spokesman, U.S. Marine advisers (who suffered no casualties) helped Afghan troops repel the attack.

== Commanders ==
- Group Captain Tony Innes (January 2013 – 2014)
  - Deputy: Wing Commander John Lyle (June 2013 – December 2013)
- Group Captain Jeff Portlock (August 2012 – January 2013)
- Group Captain Dave Waddington (unknown – August 2012)
- Group Captain Al Gillespie
- Group Captain Scott Notman (February–September 2011)
  - Deputy: Wing Commander Gordon Pell (July 2011 – January 2012)
- Group Captain Guy van den Berg (October 2010 – February 2011)
  - Deputy: Wing Commander Guy Edwards (January 2011 – July 2011)
  - Garrison Sergeant Major, Warrant Officer Class 1 Cox
- Group Captain John Cunningham (unknown – September 2010)
  - Deputy: Wing Commander Rich Yates (unknown – January 2011)
- Colonel Angus Mathie (December 2009 – June 2010)

== In media ==
Camp Shorabak has been featured in several documentaries, often focusing on medical evacuations.

- The Air Hospital (Channel 4) - aired 25 March 2010.
- Frontline Medicine (BBC 2) - aired 20 and 27 November 2011.
- Extraordinary Dogs (Documentary Channel).
- Prince Harry: Frontline Afghanistan (BBC Three) - aired 28 January 2013.
- Gary Barlow: Journey to Afghanistan (ITV) - aired 23 December 2013.
- Top Gear (BBC2) - aired 9 February 2014.
- The Billion Pound Base: Dismantling Camp Bastion (Channel 4) - aired 7 December 2014.
- The One Show - Afghanistan: Coming Home (BBC1) - Series of films on redeployment of 2RTR soldiers and equipment from Camp Bastion. Filmed in September/November 2013. Narrated by Dan Snow and Tony Livesey. - aired January 2014.
- "Our Girl"(BBC 1).
- "Road Warriors" (ITV) featuring 4 Logistic Support Regiment RLC

== See also ==
- September 2012 Camp Bastion raid
- List of Afghan Armed Forces installations
- Operation Herrick
  - Operation Herrick order of battle
