= Gregg A. Sturdevant =

United States Marine Corps general

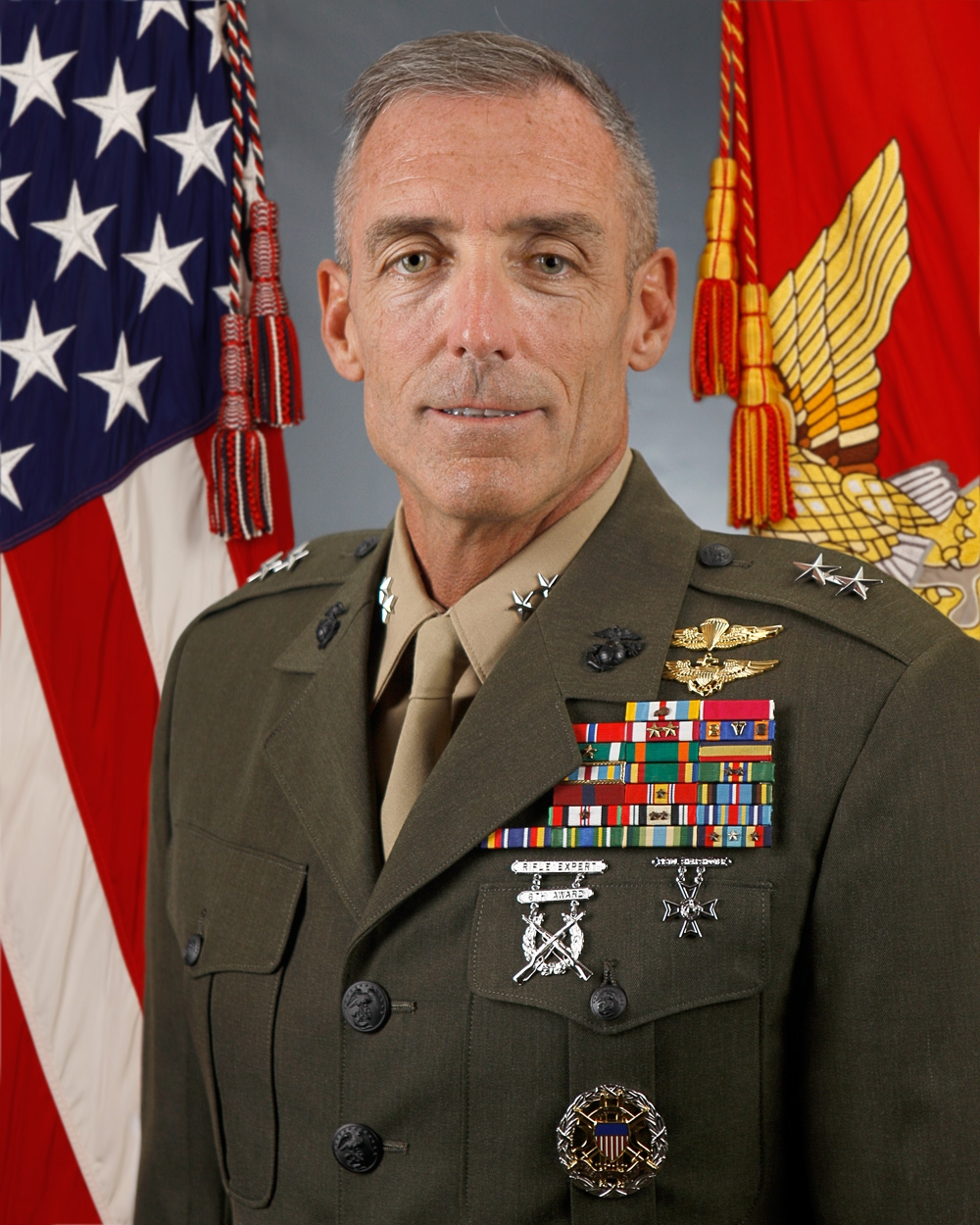
- Major General Gregg A. Sturdevant
- Allegiance: United States
- Branch: United States Marine Corps
- Service years: 1975–79; 1982–2015
- Rank: Major General
- Commands: 3rd Marine Aircraft Wing (Forward); 26th Marine Expeditionary Unit; HMM-165
- Awards: Defense Superior Service Medal (2); Legion of Merit; Bronze Star; Meritorious Service Medal (2); Air Medal with gold star, "V", and Strike/Flight numeral 2 Navy and Marine Corps Commendation Medal (2); Navy and Marine Corps Achievement Medal; Good Conduct Medal

Gregg A. Sturdevant is a retired United States Marine Corps Major General. At the time of his retirement, he was the Director of Strategic Planning and Policy (J5) for U.S. Pacific Command. From February 2012 to February 2013, he commanded the Third Marine Aircraft Wing (Forward), which included U.S. Marine Corps aviation assets then located at Camp Leatherneck / Camp Bastion in Afghanistan.

During his assignment as commanding general, on 14 September 2012, Taliban insurgents disguised in U.S. uniforms staged a suicide attack on Camp Bastion, the United Kingdom-run NATO / ISAF air base in Afghanistan. The resulting destruction of six AV-8B Harrier jet aircraft of Marine Attack Squadron 211 (VMA-211) and the death of the squadron's commanding officer and one of its staff noncommissioned officers has been described as, "arguably the worst day in USMC aviation history since the Tet Offensive of 1968."

== Military career ==
Sturdevant is originally from St. Louis, Missouri. He enlisted in the Marine Corps in 1975 and served in southern California and Okinawa, Japan, before being honorably discharged as a Sergeant (E-5) in July 1979. He then returned to college, receiving a Bachelor of Science degree in business administration from Southeast Missouri State University in July 1982, and was commissioned through the Platoon Leader Class - Air (PLC-Air) program. Upon completion of The Basic School, he reported to Naval Air Station Pensacola, Florida for flight training. Following completion of the advanced rotary-wing pipeline at Naval Air Station Whiting Field, Florida, he was designated a Naval Aviator in April 1984.

Following Fleet Replacement Squadron (FRS) training in the CH-46 helicopter, he served in the following operational squadrons and assignments: Marine Medium Helicopter Squadron 364 (HMM-364), HMM-162, HMM-365, and was the commanding officer of HMM-165 from July 2001 to May 2003. His deployments included Unit Deployments to Okinawa, Landing Force, U.S. 6th Fleet (LF6F) Deployments, U.S. 5th Fleet Deployments, and participation in Operation Enduring Freedom (OEF) and Operation Iraqi Freedom I (OIF I). Additionally, he served as a flight instructor at NAS Pensacola, Florida and did a tour with 2nd Air and Naval Gunfire Liaison Company (ANGLICO) at Camp Lejeune, North Carolina. He was Commanding Officer, 26th Marine Expeditionary Unit (26th MEU) from May 2006 to May 2008. During that time the 26th MEU deployed in support of LF6F/LF5F and served as the landing force for the USS San Antonio (LPD-17) operational evaluation.

Promoted to Brigadier General, he subsequently served in a succession of assignments at Headquarters Marine Corps and on the Joint Staff. He then served as Commanding General, 3rd Marine Aircraft Wing (Forward) and Commanding General, Bastion/Leatherneck Complex from February 2012 through February 2013 in support of Operation Enduring Freedom in Helmand Province, Afghanistan.

His major staff tours include duty at Headquarters Marine Corps in the Aviation Department's Plans, Policies, Joint Doctrine and Budget Branch (APP) where he served as the Landing Force Programs Officer focusing on rotary-wing budget matters and a tour on the Joint Staff in the Operations Directorate (J-3) where he served as an Assistant Deputy Director for Global Operations.

He has served in the following general officer assignments: Director of Public Affairs, Headquarters Marine Corps; Deputy Director for Operations, J-3, Joint Staff; Assistant Deputy Commandant for Program and Resources, Headquarters Marine Corps; Commanding General, Third Marine Aircraft Wing (Forward)/Commanding General, Bastion/Leatherneck Complex; and as Director of Plans and Policy (J5), Headquarters, U.S. Pacific Command (USPACOM).

In September 2013, while serving in follow-on assignments and following a Marine Corps investigation, Sturdevant and Major General Charles M. Gurganus were asked to retire by the Commandant of the Marine Corps, General James F. Amos, after General Amos concluded they should be held accountable for failing to secure their base in Afghanistan against the September 2012 Taliban attack that killed two Marines and destroyed materiel. In issuing this request, General Amos commented that it was the, "...hardest decision I have had to make as commandant of the Marine Corps," and that he had served with both men in combat, calling them, "...extraordinary Marine officers."

Following detachment from USPACOM at Camp H. M. Smith, Hawaii, Major General Sturdevant officially retired at Marine Corps Air Station New River, North Carolina on 17 April 2015.

== Education ==
Sturdevant received a Bachelor of Science degree in business administration from Southeast Missouri State University in July 1982. He also holds a Master of Science degree in management from Troy State University, a master's degree in Military Studies from the Marine Corps Command and Staff College and a master's degree in National Security Strategy from the National War College. He is also a graduate of the United States Air Force Air War College.

== Awards and decorations ==
Sturdevant's personal decorations include the Defense Superior Service Medal with bronze oak leaf cluster, Legion of Merit, Bronze Star, Meritorious Service Medal with 2 gold stars, Air Medal with a gold star, Combat "V" and the Strike/Flight numeral 2, Navy and Marine Corps Commendation Medal with one gold star, the Navy and Marine Corps Achievement Medal, and the Marine Corps Good Conduct Medal.
