= Gurganus =

Gurganus is a surname. Notable people with the surname include:

- Allan Gurganus (born 1947), American writer
- Charles M. Gurganus, United States Marine Corps flag officer
