= 2019 Camp Shorabak attack =

Taliban attack

- Part of the War in Afghanistan
- Location: Camp Shorabak, Helmand Province, Afghanistan
- Date: 1 March 2019; 7 years ago
- Target: Bus
- Attack type: Shooting; Suicide bombing
- Weapon: Improvised explosive device
- Deaths: 23
- Injuries: 15
- Perpetrator: Taliban

On the morning of 1 March 2019, Taliban gunmen and suicide bombers attacked Camp Shorabak in Helmand Province, Afghanistan. They killed 23 Afghan soldiers and injured another 15. Twenty insurgents were killed. None of the US Marine advisers stationed at the military base were injured.

== The attack ==
The attack took place in the early hours of the morning of 1 Mar 2019 and ended 3 Mar 2019.

Taliban fighters stormed the ANDSF [Afghan National Defence and Security Forces] base at Camp Shorabak in Helmand, southern Afghanistan, which is home to the Afghan army's 215th Corps and includes a US garrison of a few hundred Marines and soldiers. The base was of particular importance to the US military because it had previously hosted thousands of marines deployed to Helmand during the troop surge. During the attack, the Taliban, wearing Afghan military uniforms and using military equipment regularly used by the Afghan army, fooled the soldiers defending the base.

One suicide bomber detonated his explosive device in a canteen. A total of three suicide bombers were killed in the attack alongside approximately 15-20 other Taliban fighters. Afghan units were assisted by US Marines and air support to repel the Taliban attack. Marine units involved included advisors from Task Force Southwest, Golf Company, 2d Battalion, 25th Marines, and Lima Company, 3d Battalion, 4th Marines.

== Claim of Responsibility ==
The Taliban immediately claimed responsibility for the attack, their second against a major military target since the start of Taliban-US peace talks, probably to strengthen their negotiating position.
