= September 2012 raid on Camp Bastion =

2012 Taliban raid on Camp Bastion

Coordinates: 31.5124°N 64.1315°E

- Part of the War in Afghanistan (2001–2021)
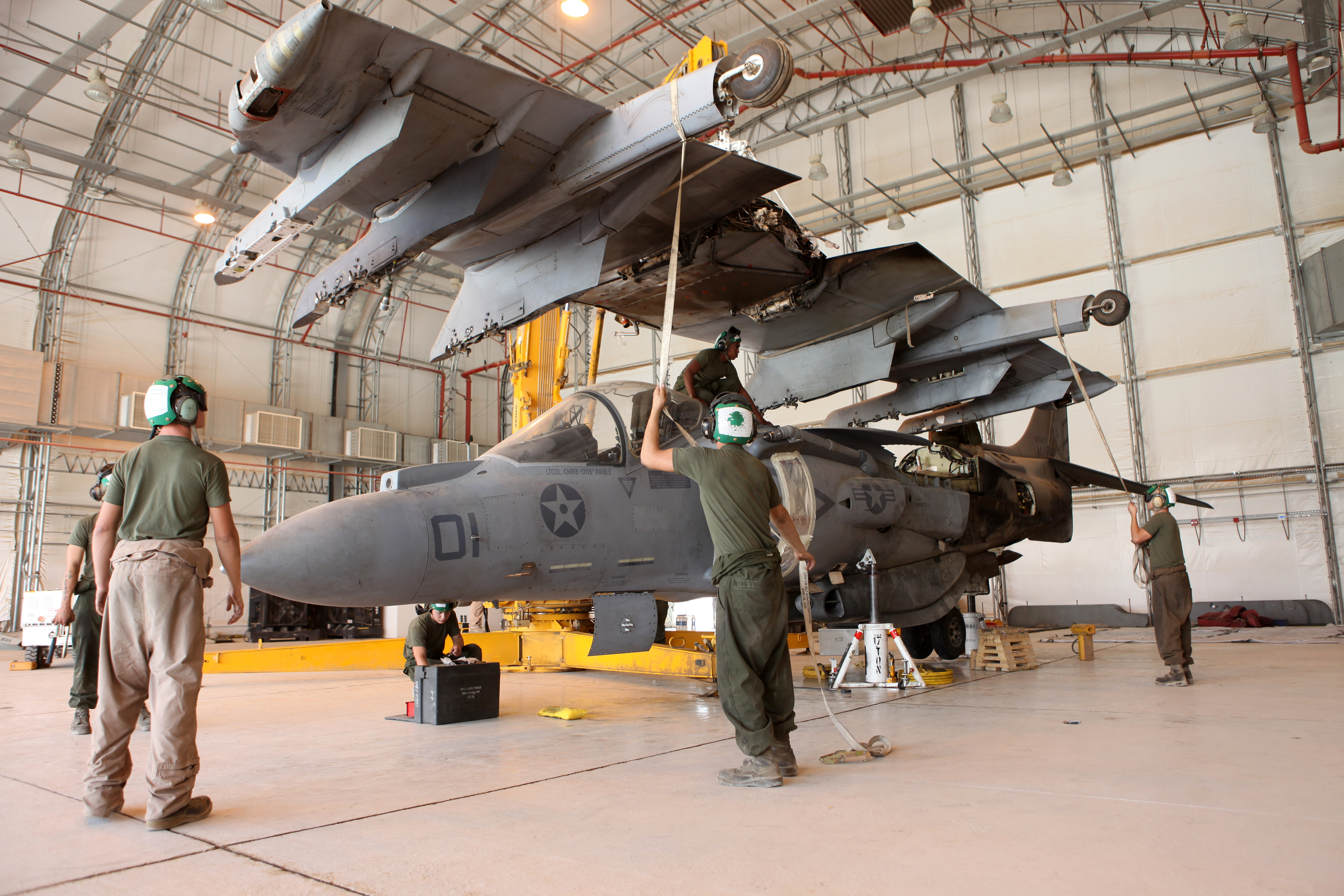
- Marines from VMA-211 at Camp Bastion, two weeks before the attack.
Date	14 September 2012
Location	Camp Bastion, Helmand Province, Afghanistan

Belligerents
ISAF / NATO: United States; United Kingdom; Tonga	Taliban

Commanders and leaders
MG. Charles Gurganus; MG. Gregg Sturdevant; Lt. Col Christopher Raible †; Sqn Ldr. Kev McMurdo; Capt. Jeff Portlock; SGT. Roy Geddes (WIA)	Unknown

Units involved
(United States) American: MALS-16 (FWD); MWSS-273; MWSS-373; VMM-161; HMH-361; VMA-211; HMLA-469 (United Kingdom) British: No. 51 Squadron RAF Regiment; Tonga: Tongan contingent	(Afghanistan) Unknown

Strength
Several hundred with Anglo-American air support	15 fighters

Casualties and losses
2 killed 17 wounded 6 Harrier aircraft destroyed 1 C-130 aircraft destroyed 2 Harrier aircraft severely damaged	14 killed 1 captured

The September 2012 raid on Camp Bastion was a Taliban raid on Camp Bastion in Afghanistan's Helmand province on the night of 14 September 2012. The base hosted British, American, Danish and Tongan military personnel at the time of the attack. The Taliban fighters killed two U.S. Marines and destroyed or severely damaged eight U.S. Marine Corps AV-8B Harriers and a United States Air Force C-130 before the entire raiding force was killed or captured. The Taliban claimed that the raid was in response to the film, Innocence of Muslims, and have also stated that Prince Harry, who was stationed at the base at the time, was the target of the attack. To replace the aircraft lost in the attack, the USMC deployed 14 Harriers to Afghanistan 36 hours after the raid.

== The raid ==
The raid was a complex and coordinated assault by 15 Taliban fighters, wearing ACU pattern camouflage and carrying several types of small arms, rocket-propelled grenades and explosive charges. The attack was initiated on the eastern side of Camp Bastion near the US Marine's aircraft hangars at 22:00 local time (17:30 GMT). The assault team penetrated the perimeter of the camp, guarded by troops from the United Kingdom and Tonga, and separated into three teams to carry out the attack. One team engaged a group of USMC mechanics from VMM-161 who were in the area; the same team also attacked the aircraft refueling stations. Another group attacked the aircraft, and the last group was engaged at the base cryogenics compound. The group that attacked the aircraft attached the explosive charges to several jets, then fired the rocket-propelled grenades (RPGs) at others.

The attackers were killed or captured during a four-hour firefight with US Marines, defence contractors from Triple Canopy, and No. 51 Squadron RAF Regiment, along with overhead helicopter fire support within Camp Bastion's perimeter fence given directly by British Apache AH1s from the UK's Joint Aviation Group, USMC AH-1W SuperCobras and machine-gun equipped UH-1Y Venoms from the USMC unit HMLA-469, which took off while under fire from the insurgents.

The RAF troops, who were located on the opposite side of the main runway, arrived at the scene approximately 12 minutes after the attack began. Some of the pilots and maintainers from Marine Attack Squadron 211 (VMA-211) also fought, killing one attacker and injuring another who was trying to fire an RPG at a group defending the flight line. This was the first time the squadron had fought since the Battle of Wake Island, when most of their planes had been destroyed in a surprise Japanese attack. A second group of five insurgents was flushed out of hiding hours later and shot by No. 51 Squadron RAF Regiment, defense contractors from Triple Canopy, and USMC forces in a compound near their entry point. The final group of five insurgents was detected near the flight line hours later and were killed by gunfire from the RAF quick reaction force and orbiting helicopters

During the early portion of the fighting, the VMA-211 squadron commander, Lieutenant Colonel Christopher Raible, 40, was killed when an anti-personnel rocket propelled grenade struck the side of the building that housed the squadron's work spaces. The rocket struck the side of the building containing the medical section. Lt. Col. Raible, after hearing several explosions outside the building, left his office to investigate when the rocket struck. A piece of fragmentation from the rocket struck him in the neck, causing him to bleed to the point of incapacity before effectively organizing a defense. The squadron executive officer, Major Robb T. McDonald, then took command, directing Marines to safety, leading a team to reconnoiter the flight line, and directing two helicopter strikes on the enemy. For these actions, he was awarded the Silver Star.

Killed nearby was USMC mechanic Sergeant Bradley Atwell, 27, while taking cover behind ground support equipment on the flight line. Atwell and Raible were killed by a single RPG round which exploded in the air above them. Seventeen US and UK personnel were injured. Six AV-8B Harrier IIs and a United States Air Force C-130 were destroyed and another two Harriers severely damaged. Three refuelling stations were destroyed and six soft-skin aircraft hangars damaged.

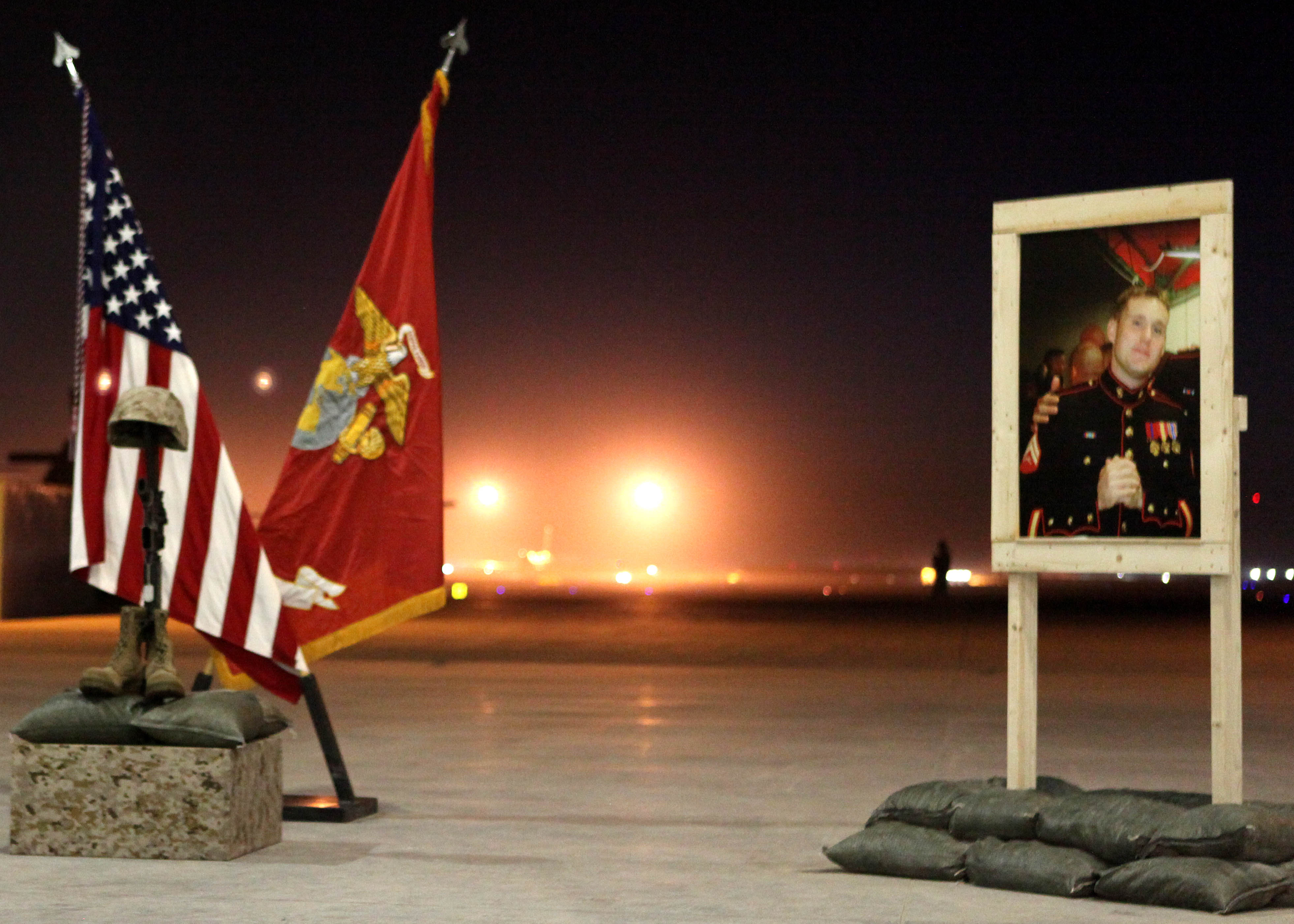
Sergeant Atwell Memorial

== Aftermath ==
The attack was described as "the worst loss of U.S. airpower in a single incident since the Vietnam War"; the attack caused 200 million USD in damages. Together, the six destroyed and two damaged Harriers constituted six percent of the USMC's inventory. Normal attrition of the USMC's Harrier jets is around two airframes a year. To replace the aircraft lost in the attack, the USMC deployed 14 Harriers to Afghanistan within 36 hours of the raid.

The Taliban claimed that the raid was in response to the film Innocence of Muslims, and have also stated that Prince Harry, who was stationed at the base at the time, was the target of the attack.

The BBC claimed that the attack "bore all the hallmarks of the Haqqani network". The ISAF claimed a week later that it had captured one of the raid's planners.

=== USMC response ===
Marine Major General Charles M. Gurganus was in charge of the base defenses and had reduced the number of Marines patrolling the base perimeter from 325 to 100 one month before the attack. After pressure from the families of those killed or injured in the battle, the US Senate put Gurganus' promotion to Lieutenant General on hold. On 30 September 2013, USMC Commandant James F. Amos announced that he had found Gurganus and USMC Major General Gregg A. Sturdevant to be accountable for failures of the base defenses during the raid. Sturdevant was in charge of USMC aviation assets in that region of Afghanistan. Both were directed to retire from the USMC immediately at their current ranks of Major General.

The Marine Corps stated Gurganus "bore final accountability for the lives and equipment under his charge," and he "made an error in judgment when conducting his risk assessment of the enemy's capabilities and intentions." Sturdevant, the USMC said, "did not adequately assess the force protection situation".

Both men retired honorably and with full benefits. According to NBC News, a senior U.S. defense official remarked that if Gurganus was not a general he would have faced a court martial, which would have prevented retirement with full benefits. "Marines are dead and six aircraft were destroyed. A Lance Corporal would fry for a lot less than that," NBC quoted the official saying.

=== British response ===
The British House of Commons cross-party Defence Select Committee investigated the incident, and published their report on 16 April 2014. They concluded that "The arrangements for manning of the guard towers around the perimeter of Camp Bastion were exposed by the attack as inadequate.", and that "British commanders must bear a degree of responsibility for... systemic failures and associated reputational damage".

=== Tongan response ===
A September 2013 article in GQ stated that soldiers from the Tongan contingent in Afghanistan had been responsible for the section of the perimeter which was breached, and that US Marines had sometimes found members of the contingent asleep while on guard duty. In October that year the acting commander of the Tongan Armed Forces stated that the Tongan force at Camp Bastion had not been required to fully man the section of Camp Bastion's perimeter through which the attackers passed. The British High Commissioner to Tonga also stated that it was British, and not Tongan, personnel who were responsible for the penetrated section of the perimeter and that allegations which arose from a US Military enquiry claiming that Tongan troops had been caught sleeping while on guard duty were not correct.

== See also ==
- Raid on Yontan Airfield - a similar suicide assault on an American airfield at Okinawa on 24 May 1945, during the Pacific War.
- Giretsu Kuteitai - the Japanese airborne suicide unit of paratroopers which performed the attack on Yontan.
