= 208 (Liverpool) Field Hospital =

208 (Liverpool) General Hospital 208 (Merseyside) Field Hospital 208 (Liverpool) Field Hospital
- Active: 1967 – 2023
- Country: United Kingdom
- Branch: British Army
- Role: Medical
- Size: Field Hospital
- Part of: 2nd Medical Brigade
- Garrison/HQ: Liverpool

208 (Liverpool) Field Hospital was a unit of the Royal Army Medical Corps within the Army Reserve of the British Army.

== History ==
The hospital was formed upon the formation of the TAVR in 1967, from the amalgamation of 8th (Liverpool) General Hospital, 165th (Western) Casualty Clearing Station, and 126th (Bebington) Field Ambulance, as the 208 (Liverpool) General Hospital. Throughout the Cold War, the hospital was under the command of 42nd (Northwest) Infantry Brigade; and on transfer to war, would re-subordinate to Commander Medical BAOR, to provide 800 beds in the 4th Garrison Area. During the reforms implemented after the Cold War, the hospital was re-designated as 208 (Liverpool) Field Hospital. As a result of Army 2020, the unit was restructured under 2nd Medical Brigade, and was paired with the now disbanded 22 Field Hospital.

Under Future Soldier reforms, 208 (Liverpool) Field Hospital was amalgamated with 207 (Manchester) Field Hospital to form 206 (North West) Multi-Role Medical Regiment in 2023. The new regiment falls under 2nd Medical Group.

== Structure ==
The hospital's structure at disbandment was as follows:

- Headquarters, at Chavasse House, Liverpool
- A Squadron, at Chavasse House, Liverpool
- B Squadron, at Ellesmere Port
- C Squadron, at Sir Matthew Fell House, Blackpool
- D Squadron, at Alexandra Barracks, Lancaster
