= VMFA-211 =

United States Marine Corps fighter attack squadron

Marine Fighter Attack Squadron 211
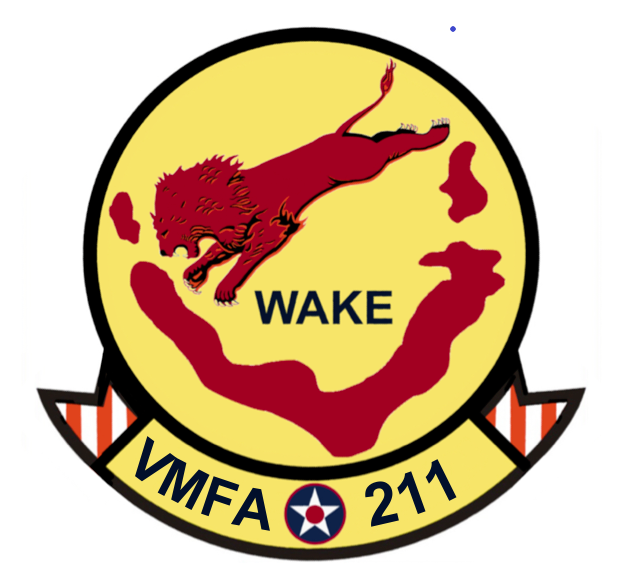
- VMFA-211 squadron insignia
- Active: 1 January 1937 – present
- Country: United States
- Branch: United States Marine Corps
- Role: Close air support Air interdiction Aerial reconnaissance
- Part of: Marine Aircraft Group 13; 3rd Marine Aircraft Wing
- Garrison/HQ: Marine Corps Air Station Yuma
- Nickname: "Wake Island Avengers" "Bastion Defenders"
- Tail Code: CF
- Engagements: World War II * Battle of Wake Island * Bougainville campaign (1943–45) * Philippines campaign (1944–45) * Battle of the Bismarck Sea * Battle of Leyte Gulf; Vietnam War; Operation Enduring Freedom * Camp Bastion attack Operation Iraqi Freedom * 2003 invasion of Iraq; Operation Inherent Resolve

Commanders
- Commanding Officer: LtCol. Michael B. Jones
- Executive Officer: Maj. Travis J. Theimer
- Notable commanders: Gen. Vernon E. Megee; LtCol. Christopher K. Raible

Aircraft flown
- Attack: AD-4N Skyraider (1952–57); A-4 Skyhawk (1957–89); AV-8B Harrier II (1985–2016)
- Fighter: Grumman F3F-2 (1937–42); Brewster F2A-3; F4F Wildcat (1941–43); F4U Corsair (1943–52); F-35B Lightning II (2016–present)

Marine Fighter Attack Squadron 211 (VMFA-211) is a United States Marine Corps fighter attack squadron, currently consisting of F-35B Lightning II stealth STOVL strike fighter jets. Known as the "Wake Island Avengers" and the "Bastion Defenders", the squadron is based at Marine Corps Air Station Yuma, Arizona and falls under the command of Marine Aircraft Group 13 (MAG-13) and the 3rd Marine Aircraft Wing (3rd MAW).

== Mission ==
To attack and destroy surface targets, intercept and destroy enemy aircraft, provide electronic warfare support, and network enabled reconnaissance support across the full spectrum of combat operations.

== History ==
=== Early history ===
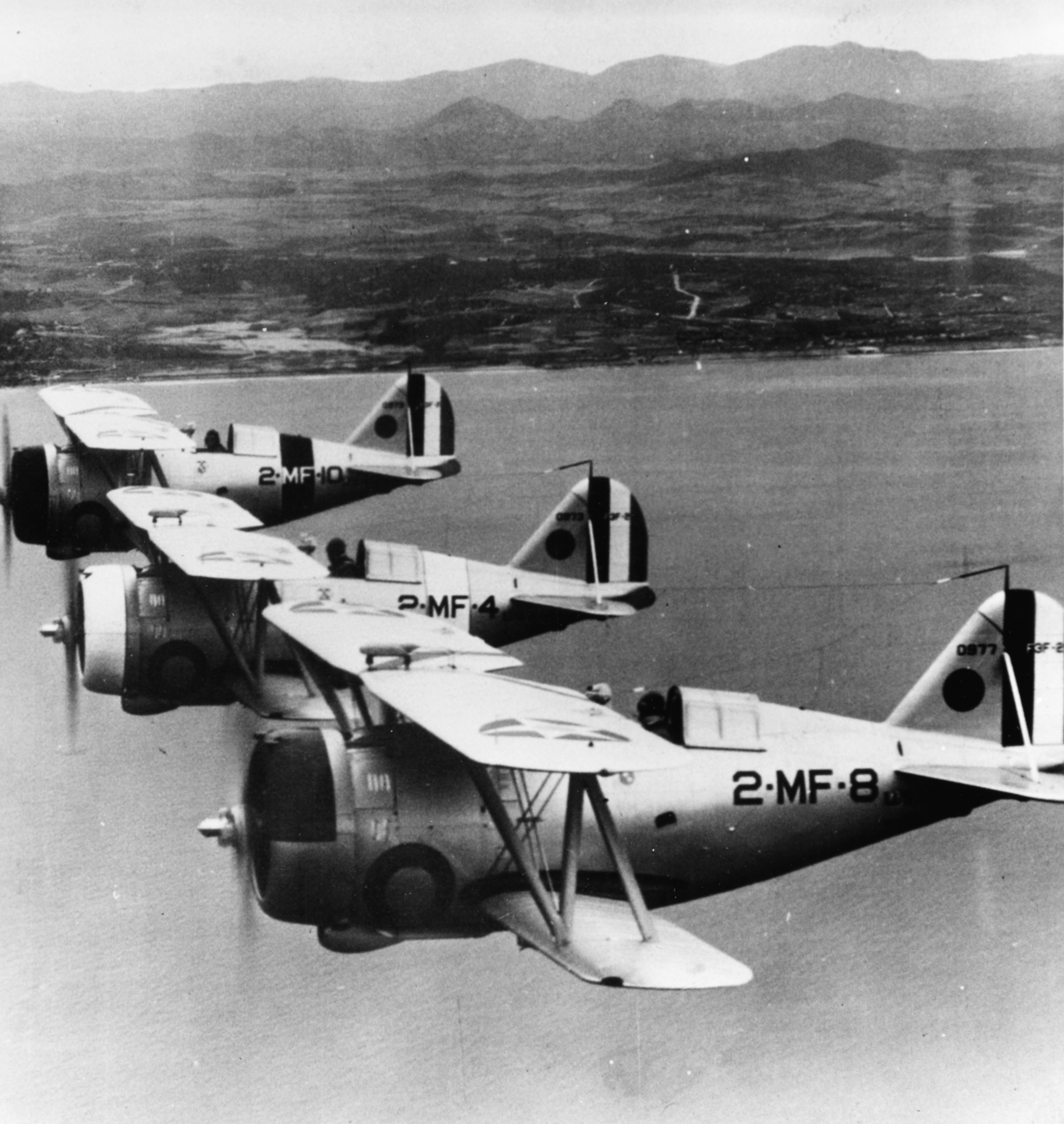
Grumman F3Fs of VMF-2

VMFA-211 was commissioned on 1 January 1937 as Marine Fighting Squadron 4 (VF-4M) at Naval Air Station San Diego, California. Although it was the second time a VF-4M had existed, it is not considered in the same squadron lineage. The previous VF-4M was commissioned in 1931 and decommissioned in 1933 but was re-designated as VF-8M in 1935. On 1 July 1937, VF-4M was re-designated Marine Fighting Squadron 2 (VMF-2) and by the end of the year, had completely reequipped with Grumman F3F-2s which replaced their F3F-1s and a few even older F2F-1s. The squadron participated in annual Fleet Problems while at San Diego and even played a part in the making of the movie Dive Bomber. Several future Medal of Honor recipients served with the squadron during this period, including Henry Elrod, Robert Galer, and Gregory Boyington. In January 1941, the squadron moved to Marine Corps Air Station Ewa, Hawaii and was re-designated VMF-211 on 1 July 1941.

=== World War II ===
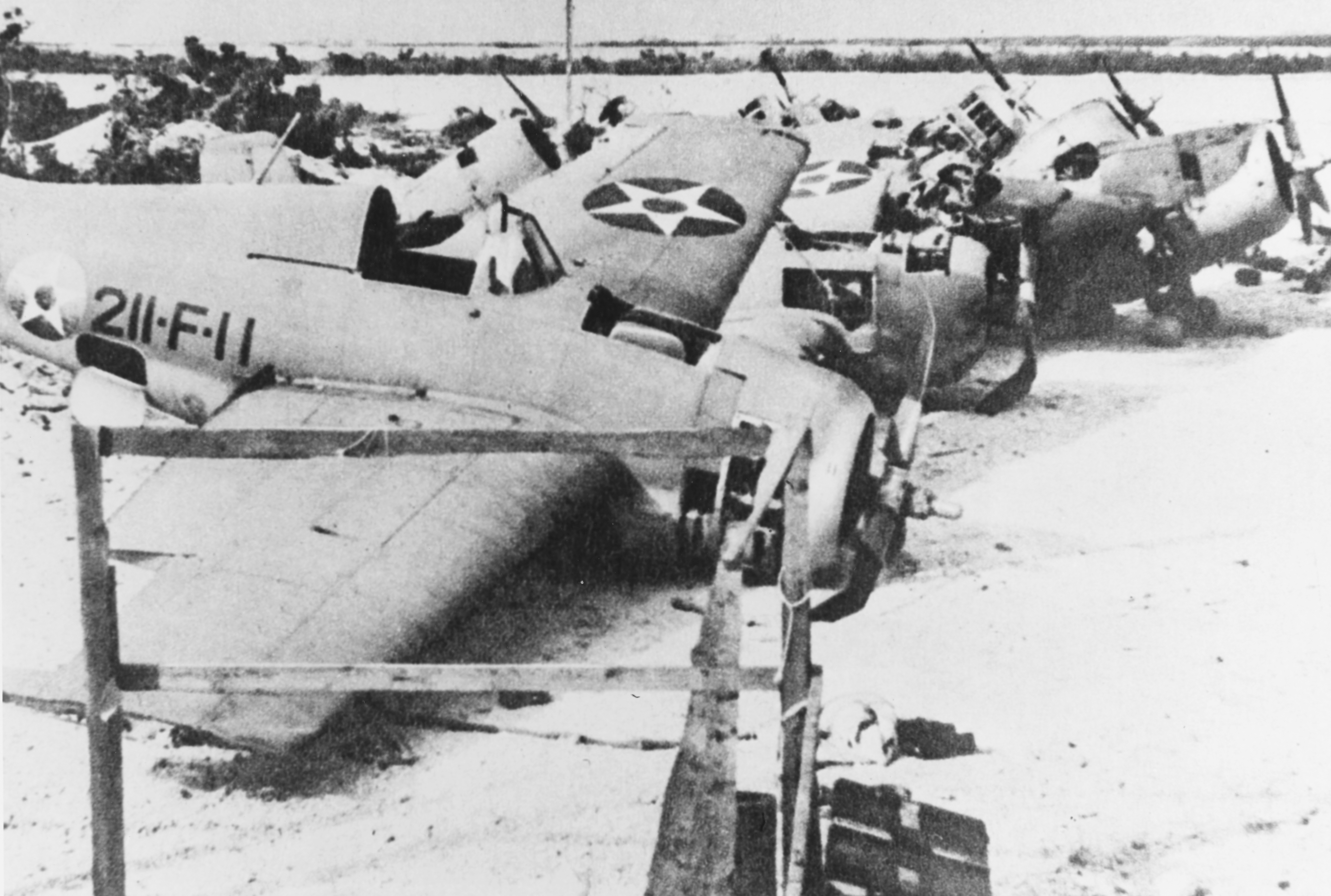
Wreckage of Captain Elrod's F4F-3 after the Japanese captured Wake Island

In November 1941, VMF-211 embarked 12 of its 24 F4F-3 Wildcats and 13 of its 29 pilots aboard USS Enterprise for movement to Wake Island, the scene of the squadron's heroic battle, launching from the carrier and arriving at Wake on 3 December. On 8 December 1941, the Japanese attacked Wake, destroying seven of the aircraft on the ground. Over the next two weeks, the remaining five planes repelled numerous attacks and inflicted great losses on the enemy.

During the course of this defense, the Marine ground forces and VMF-211 caused the loss of at least four enemy warships, including the first major Japanese naval vessels sunk during the Pacific war. The squadron was also credited with 8 aircraft destroyed. After the loss of its last aircraft, the squadron became a ground unit and fought until the surrender of the atoll. The first Marine airman to be awarded the Medal of Honor in World War II was VMF-211's Henry T. Elrod. A planned operation to reinforce Wake Island was deemed too dangerous by the fleet command, and on 23 December Wake Island was finally overrun by a numerically superior enemy.

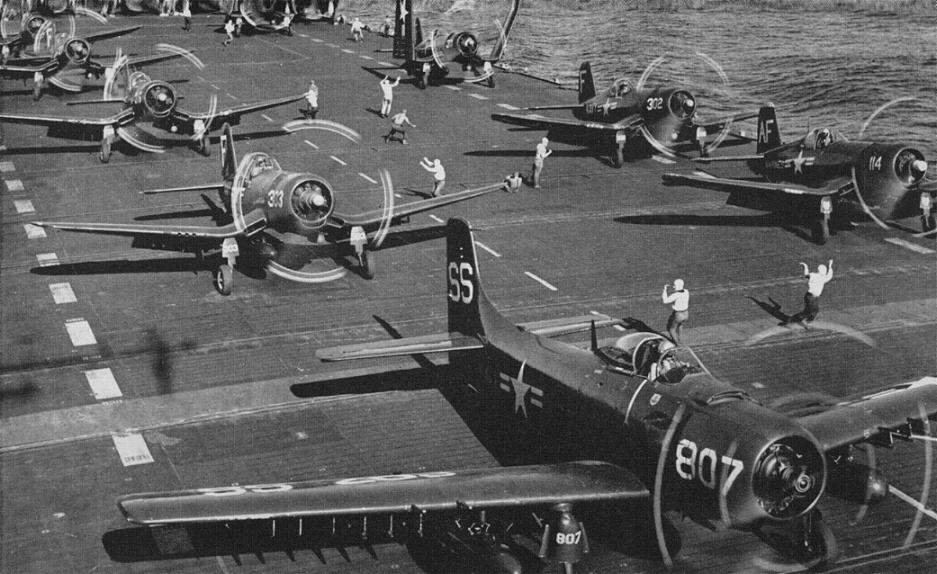
VMF-211 F4U-4s on USS Coral Sea in 1952

The squadron's rear echelon at Marine Corps Air Station Ewa lost all but one of its twelve F4F-3s during the attack on Pearl Harbor, and even this lone survivor was lost when it was transferred to the Navy. In February 1942, the squadron was commanded by future Medal of Honor recipient Harold W. Bauer. Slowly rebuilding as personnel and aircraft became available, the squadron, now under the command of Major Luther S. Moore was deployed in April 1942 to Palmyra Atoll in the Line Islands and adopted the name "Avengers" in memory of those squadron members who were killed or captured on Wake Island. When first deployed, VMF-211 was equipped with the Brewster F2A-3 and it was not until July that sufficient numbers of Grumman F4F-4 Wildcats became available to re-equip the squadron. As the Pacific Campaign continued the squadron transitioned to the F4U Corsair for the remainder of the war. VMF-211 participated in the Treasury-Bougainville Campaign, Battle of the Bismarck Sea, Northern Solomon, Battle of Leyte Gulf and Southern Philippine campaigns.

=== After World War II ===
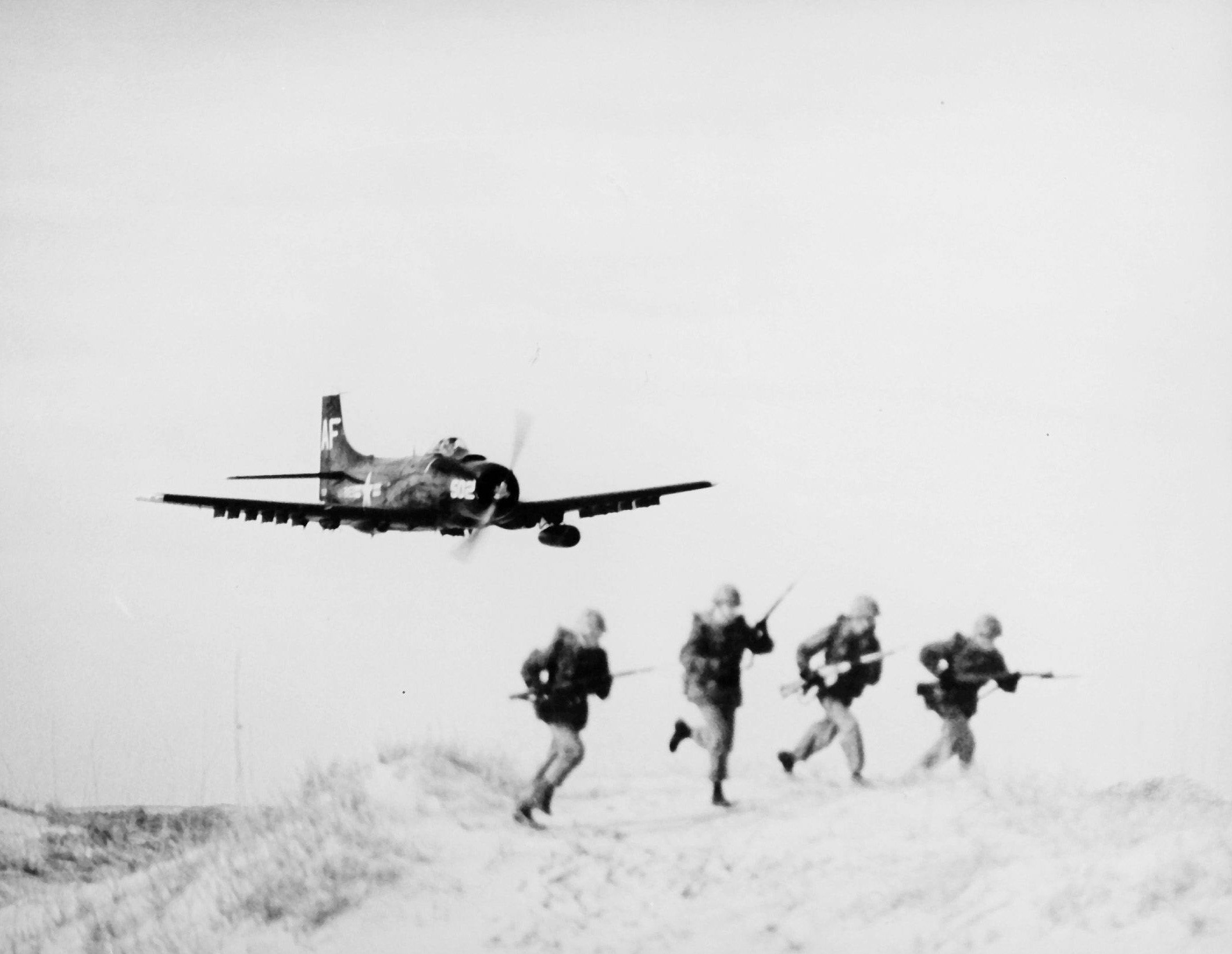
A VMA-211 AD-4N over Onslow Beach

After World War II, VMF-211 participated in the occupation of China where they would eventually provide cover for American forces evacuating the country before the Communist takeover in December 1948. Following this action they returned to Marine Corps Auxiliary Air Field Edenton, North Carolina, in 1949. While operating aboard USS Coral Sea on 30 June 1952, the squadron was re-designated Marine Attack Squadron 211 (VMA-211) when they transitioned to the AD-4N Skyraider. In 1957, the squadron received its first A4D-1 Skyhawks and subsequently moved to Marine Corps Air Station Iwakuni in Japan in 1958. VMA-211 flew several versions of the Skyhawk, receiving the A4D-2 (A-4B) in 1958, the A4D-2N (A-4C) in 1960, the A-4E in 1964, and the A-4M in 1976.

=== Vietnam War ===
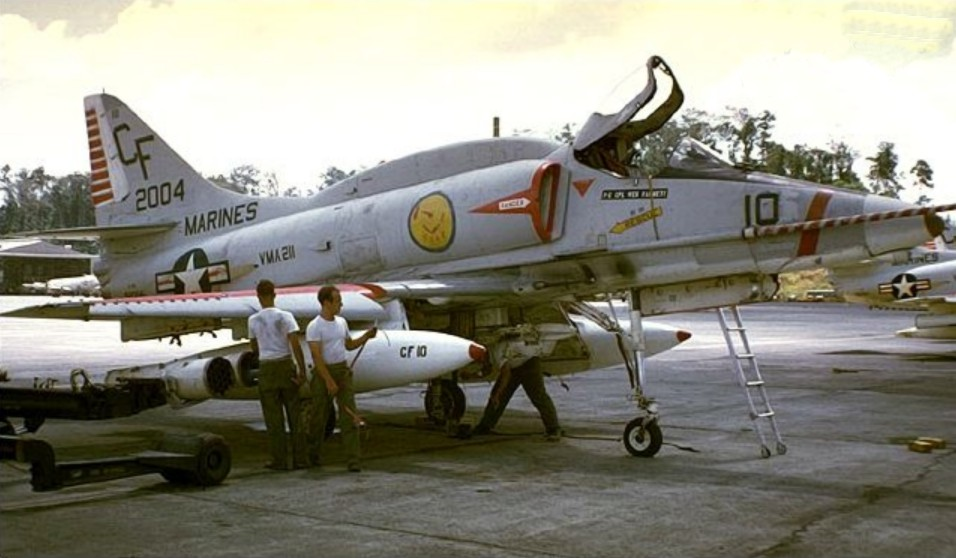
VMA-211 A-4Es in 1971

With escalation of the Vietnam War, VMA-211 moved to Iwakuni Japan in 1965 and commenced the first of four deployments to Chu Lai Air Base, South Vietnam. LtCol. F.H. Thurston became the CO of the Squadron on 25 August 1967.

VMA-211 was deployed in the spring of 1972 to Naha Air Force Base and on 16 May 1972 redeployed to Bien Hoa Air Base in South Vietnam. It reinforced the USAF 8th Special Operations Squadron flying the A-37B Dragonfly, as well as F-4s tasked from Shaw AFB in support of operations against the North Vietnamese People's Army of Vietnam (PAVN) Easter Offensive.

The other unit at Bien Hoa was an AH-1 Cobra gunship squadron. The four different squadrons representing three branches of service were significant contributors to blunting, then rolling back the PAVN's siege of An Lộc, destroying significant numbers of PAVN armor being used for the first time in the war. VMA 211's A-4E were invaluable in close air support of the beleaguered ground troops in An Loc and surrounding areas. In August 1976, the squadron returned to MCAS El Toro.

=== Post Vietnam ===
In September 1987, the squadron celebrated an aviation milestone when it passed 30 years of flying the McDonnell Douglas A-4 Skyhawk. Following a UDP rotation to Westpac, VMA-211 relocated to MCAS Yuma, AZ on 10 December 1987 joining MAG-13. After successfully completing the last overseas deployment with the A-4M Skyhawk in 1989, VMA-211 began transferring these aircraft to the 4th Marine Aircraft Wing in preparation for transition to the AV-8B Night Attack aircraft. In June 1990 the squadron began flying the Night Attack variant of the Harrier. During this time the Avengers were awarded Marine Corps Aviation Association "Attack Squadron of the Year" three times, in 1995, 1996, and 1998.

In September 2000, the squadron began introduction of the latest Harrier variant, the AV-8B II+ radar aircraft. The squadron soon fielded a complement of both Radar and Night Attack Harriers.

=== Global War on Terror ===
After the 11 September terror attacks, the squadron deployed to the Arabian Sea aboard USS Bonhomme Richard. The Avengers participated in Operation Enduring Freedom, flying combat missions against targets in Afghanistan from January to March 2002.

After a short break, the following January found the Avengers aboard USS Bonhomme Richard. This time the squadron was headed for the Persian Gulf, in support of Operation Iraqi Freedom (OIF). In one month of combat flying, the squadron flew over 360 sorties and 640 hours of flight time. The squadron returned to Marine Corps Air Station Yuma in May 2003.

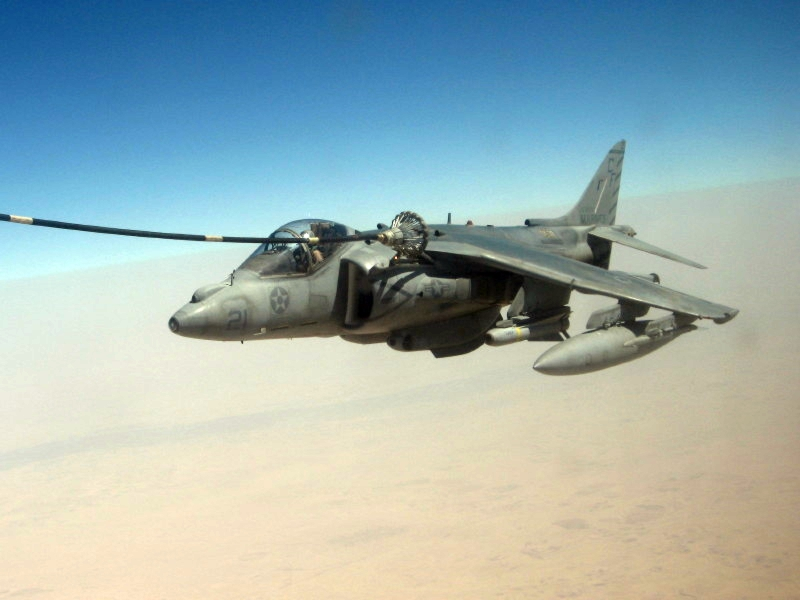
A VMA-211 Harrier II refueling over Iraq in October 2006

The squadron deployed to Iraq off USS Essex from October 2004 through February 2005 where they were based at Al Asad Airbase. They again deployed to Al Asad from USS Tarawa in support of OIF from October 2005 until January 2006.

In September 2006, the Avengers again deployed in support of Operation Iraqi Freedom to Al Asad Air Base. From January til August 2009, the squadron again deployed as part of the 31st Marine Expeditionary Unit on board USS Essex.

In April 2012, the Avengers deployed in support of Operation Enduring Freedom, moving from Kandahar Airfield to British-run Camp Bastion in July.

While at Camp Bastion, the Avengers experienced six Harriers destroyed, and two severely damaged, during an attack on the base in September. Two Marines were also killed, including the squadron commander Lt. Col. Christopher K. Raible.

In September 2014, the Avengers deployed to Bahrain to support the fight on terrorism in Iraq and Syria until April 2015.

=== Transition to F-35B Lightning II ===
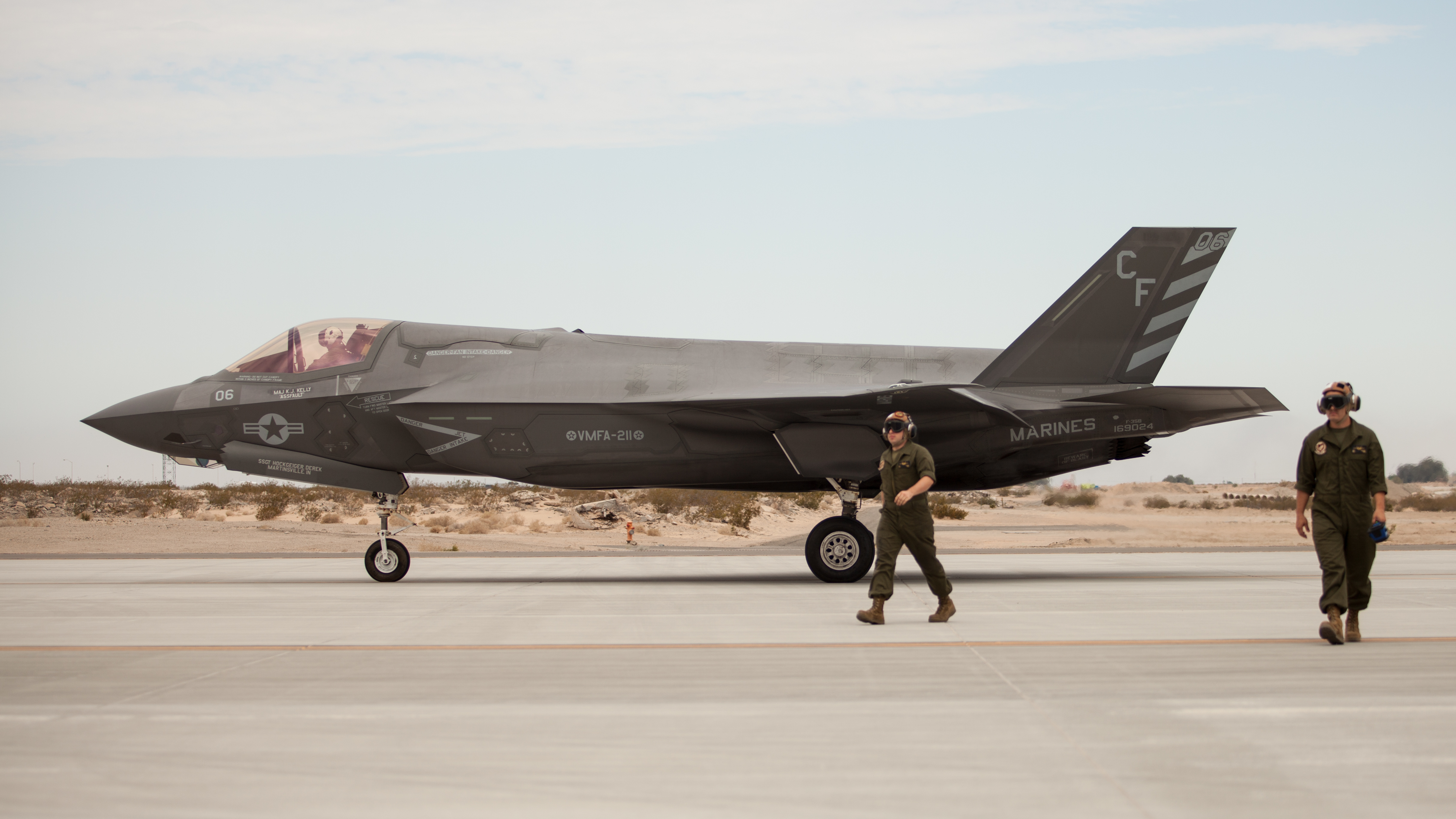
A VMFA-211 F-35B in June 2016.

The Avengers conducted their last AV-8B Harrier flight on 6 May 2016 and received their first two F-35B Lightning IIs on 9 May. On 30 June 2016, VMA-211 was redesignated as VMFA-211, becoming the second fleet squadron in the Marine Corps to operate the F-35B Lightning II as their primary aircraft.

In September 2018 VMFA-211 deployed aboard USS Essex as part of the Essex Amphibious Ready Group deployed to the United States Central Command area of operations. On 27 September 2018 an F-35B from Essex carried out an air strike using a precision-guided bomb against a Taliban position in Afghanistan, marking the first US combat use of the F-35.

On 4 September 2020 the squadron deployed to RAF Marham in the United Kingdom, with 10 F-35Bs. The squadron trained alongside 617 Squadron of the Royal Air Force in preparation for a deployment where the two squadrons formed the fixed-wing component embarked on HMS Queen Elizabeth during the UK Carrier Strike Group's debut deployment in 2021.

== Squadron Aces ==
The following Marines from the squadron have been credited with more than five victories in aerial combats:

- John C. Hundley - 6.0
- Julius W. Ireland - 5.333

== Awards ==
- Presidential Unit Citation with three bronze stars
- Navy Unit Commendation with one silver and one bronze star
- Meritorious Unit Citation
- American Defense Service Medal with "BASE" clasp
- Marine Corps Expeditionary Medal with "WAKE ISLAND" clasp
- Asiatic-Pacific Campaign Medal with seven battle stars
- World War II Victory Medal
- China Service Medal
- National Defense Service Medal with three bronze stars
- Armed Forces Expeditionary Medal
- Vietnam Service Medal with two silver and two bronze campaign stars
- Afghanistan Campaign Medal with one campaign star
- Iraq Campaign Medal with four campaign stars
- Global War on Terrorism Expeditionary Medal
- Global War on Terrorism Service Medal
- Vietnam Cross of Gallantry with palm
- Republic of Vietnam Campaign Medal

== See also ==
- United States Marine Corps Aviation
- List of active United States Marine Corps aircraft squadrons
