= Charles M. Gurganus =

United States Marine Corps general

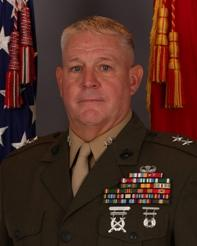
- Major General Charles Mark Gurganus
- Military career
- Allegiance: United States
- Branch: United States Marine Corps
- Service years: 1976–2013
- Rank: Major general
- Commands: 1 MEF (FWD) / Regional Command Southwest; MAGTF Training Command / MCAGCC, 29 Palms CA; Regimental Combat Team 8; 8th Marines; 3rd Battalion 6th Marines
- Conflicts: Iraq War, Afghanistan War
- Awards: Defense Superior Service Medal; Legion of Merit W/ Valor (2); Meritorious Service Medal (3); Joint Service Commendation Medal; Navy Commendation Medal; Navy Achievement Medal; Combat Action Ribbon

Charles Mark Gurganus is a retired U.S. Marine major general who commanded Regional Command Southwest and I Marine Expeditionary Force (Forward) in Afghanistan and was relieved because he and Major General Gregg A. Sturdevant oversaw "the worst loss of U.S. airpower in a single incident since the Vietnam War" during the September 2012 raid on Camp Bastion. The Commandant of the Marine Corps, General James F. Amos, requested that General Sturdevant and General Gurganus retire in the aftermath of the incident and its investigation, commenting that it was the "...hardest decision I have had to make as commandant of the Marine Corps," and that he had served with both men in combat, calling them "...extraordinary Marine officers."

== Education ==
Gurganus graduated from the University of North Carolina and was commissioned in May 1976. After the basic school, he served as a Rifle Platoon Commander and Company Executive Officer in 2d Battalion, 1st Marines (1977–79).

== Military career ==
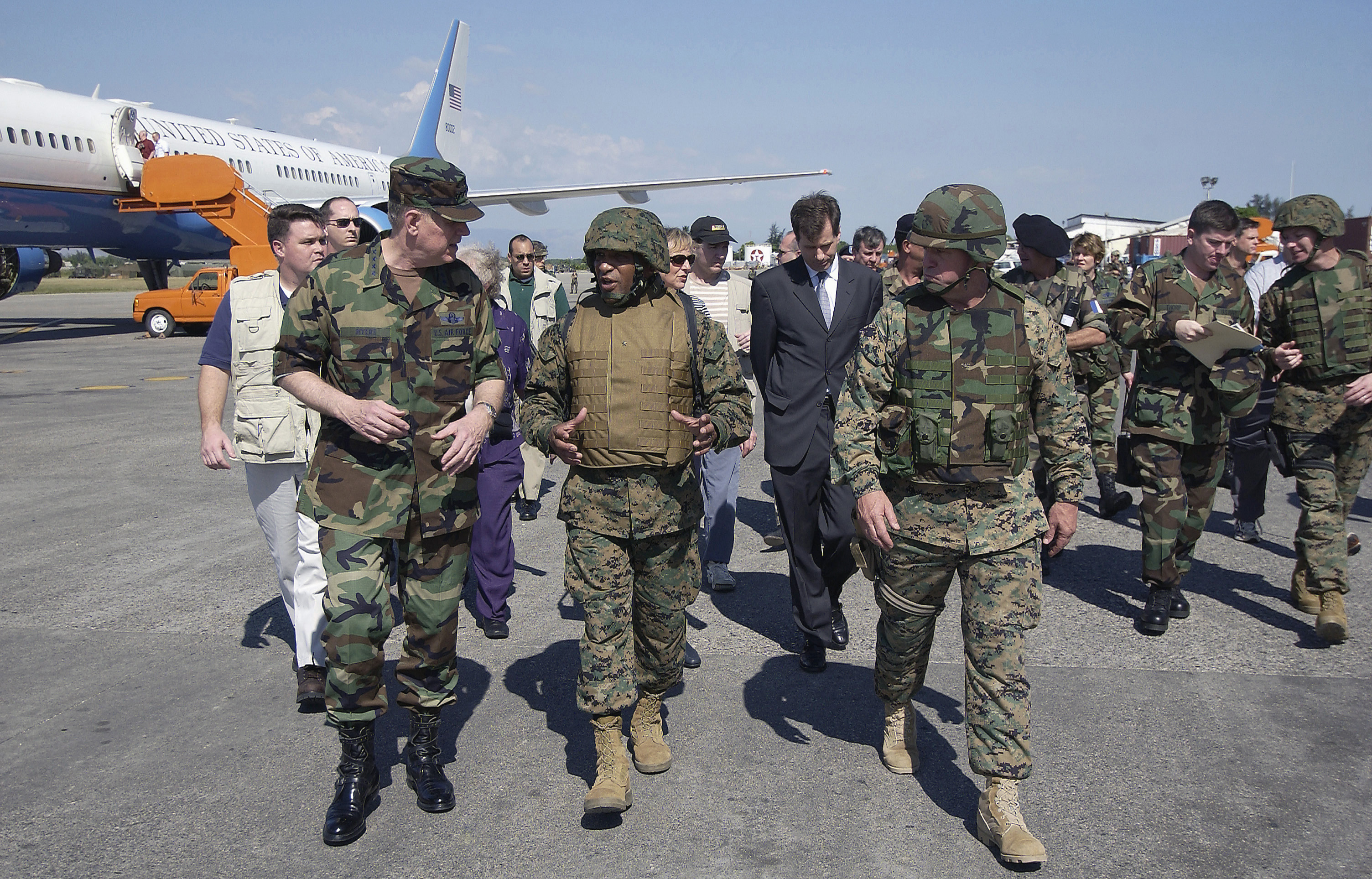
Colonel Charles M. Gurganus with Chairman of the Joint Chiefs of Staff General Richard B. Myers and Brigadier General Ronald S. Coleman at Port-au-Prince Airport, Haiti during Operation Secure Tomorrow.

Gurganus commanded Special Purpose MAGTF-8 in Haiti and the Regimental Combat Team 8 in Anbar Province, Iraq in various capacities from 2005 to 2008.

From 2010 to 2011, he was commander, US Marine Corps Forces Korea and U/C/J-5 (Strategy) of United Nations Command/Combined Forces Command/United States Forces Korea (2009–11) at Yongsan Garrison in Seoul.

His medals include the Defense Superior Service Medal, the Legions of Merit with V device, and a gold star (in lieu of a second award).

Following the September 2012 Camp Bastion Raid, Gurganus and other members of the base's military leadership came under investigation for negligence. Some guard towers at the base were occupied by dummies. Two US service members, LtCol Christopher Raible and Sgt Bradley Atwell, were killed by enemy rocket fire in the attack. Raible was the commander of the Harrier squadron attached to the base. The entire Harrier squadron was destroyed or rendered combat ineffective as a result of the raid, making the attack the largest hit on US air-power since the Vietnam War.

On September 30, 2013, Gurganus was asked to retire, along with the Marine major general who commanded the aviation arm at Camp Bastion, Gregg A. Sturdevant (whom the commandant recommended receiving a Letter of Censure by the Secretary of the Navy), and both complied. They were both honorably discharged and received full pay, pension, and benefits. Before the investigation, Gurganus had been nominated for a third star as Marine Corps Chief of Staff at the Pentagon; the appointment and the possibility of promotion to lieutenant general have now been rescinded.

== Other assignments ==
Other operational assignments included assistant operations officer, rifle company commander, and weapons company commander with 3rd Battalion, 6th Marines (1984–87); commanding officer, 3rd Battalion, 6th Marines and G-7, 2nd Marine Division (1995–97); G-3 current operations officer, III Marine Expeditionary Force (2001–02); deputy commander, 4th Marine Expeditionary Brigade (2002–03); commanding officer, 8th Marine Regiment (2003–05); commanding officer, Regimental Combat Team 8 (March 2005 – August 2005) in Al Anbar Province, Iraq; operations officer, 2nd Marine Division; assistant division commander, 2nd Marine Division (2006–08).

Supporting establishment duties included executive officer and commanding officer, Marine Detachment, USS America (CV-66) (1979–81); aide-de-camp to CG, MCB, Camp Lejeune (1981–82); company commander at the Infantry Training School (1982–83); depot training officer, OIC of the Field Training Unit, and operations officer of support battalion at Marine Corps Recruit Depot, Parris Island, S.C. (1987–90); OCS company commander (1990); and MAGTF staff training program instructor (1992–95). Joint assignments include chief, Deployable Training Team, Joint Warfighting Center, U.S. Joint Forces command (1998–2001).
