= 201 (Northern) Field Hospital =

201 (Northern) General Hospital 201 (Northern) Field Hospital
- Active: 1967 – 2023
- Country: United Kingdom
- Branch: British Army
- Role: Medical
- Size: Field Hospital; 204 personnel
- Part of: 2nd Medical Brigade
- Garrison/HQ: Fenham Barracks

201 (Northern) Field Hospital was a unit of the Royal Army Medical Corps within the Army Reserve of the British Army.

== History ==
The hospital was formed upon the formation of the TAVR in 1967, from the amalgamation of 1st (Northern) General Hospital, and 149 (Northumbrian) Field Ambulance, as the 201 (Northern) General Hospital. Throughout the Cold War, the hospital was under North East District; and upon transfer to war, would come under control of Commander Medical 1 (BR) Corps, to provide 800 beds in the 4th Garrison Area. During the reforms implemented after the Cold War, the hospital was re-designated as 201 (Northern) Field Hospital. As a consequence of Army 2020, the unit fell under 2nd Medical Brigade, and was paired with 34 Field Hospital.

Under the Future Soldier programme, the regiment amalgamated with 212th (Yorkshire) Field Hospital to form 214th (North East) Multi-Role Medical Regiment in 2023. The new regiment is under the command of 2nd Medical Group.

== Structure ==
The hospital's structure was as follows:

- Headquarters, at Fenham Barracks, Newcastle upon Tyne
- A Detachment, at Barnard Armoury, Newton Aycliffe
- B Detachment, at Fenham Barracks, Newcastle upon Tyne
- C Detachment, at Stockton-on-Tees
