= 212 (Yorkshire) Field Hospital =

212 (Sheffield) Casualty Clearing Station 212 (Sheffield) Field Hospital 212 (Yorkshire) Field Hospital
- Active: 1967 – 2023
- Country: United Kingdom
- Branch: British Army
- Role: Medical
- Size: Field Hospital
- Part of: 2nd Medical Brigade
- Garrison/HQ: Sheffield

212 (Yorkshire) Field Hospital was a unit of the Royal Army Medical Corps within the Army Reserve of the British Army.

== History ==
The hospital was formed upon the formation of the TAVR in 1967, from the amalgamation of 146th (West Riding and Midland) Field Ambulance, and 50th (Leeds) Field Dressing Station, as the 212 (Sheffield) Casualty Clearing Station. Throughout the Cold War, the hospital was under the command of North East District; and on transfer to war, would re-subordinate to Commander Medical 1 (BR) Corps, to provide 400 beds. During the reforms implemented after the Cold War, the hospital was re-designated as 212 (Yorkshire) Field Hospital. As a result of Army 2020, the unit then fell under the command of 2nd Medical Brigade, and was paired with the now disbanded 34 Field Hospital.

As part of the Future Soldier programme, the regiment amalgamated with 201st (Northern) Field Hospital to form 214th (North East) Multi-Role Medical Regiment in 2023. This new regiment is a part of the 2nd Medical Group.

== Structure ==
The hospital's structure on disbandment was as follows:

- Headquarters, at Endcliffe Hall, Sheffield
- Headquarters Squadron, at Endcliffe Hall, Sheffield
- A Detachment, at Harewood Barracks, Leeds
- B Detachment, at Nottingham and Lincoln
- C Detachment, at Belle Vue Barracks, Bradford
